= Almaliq, Xinjiang =

Medieval city in present-day Xinjiang, China

- Location within Continental Asia Location within China Location within Xinjiang
- 44°14′24″N 80°31′59″E
- Location: Xinjiang, China

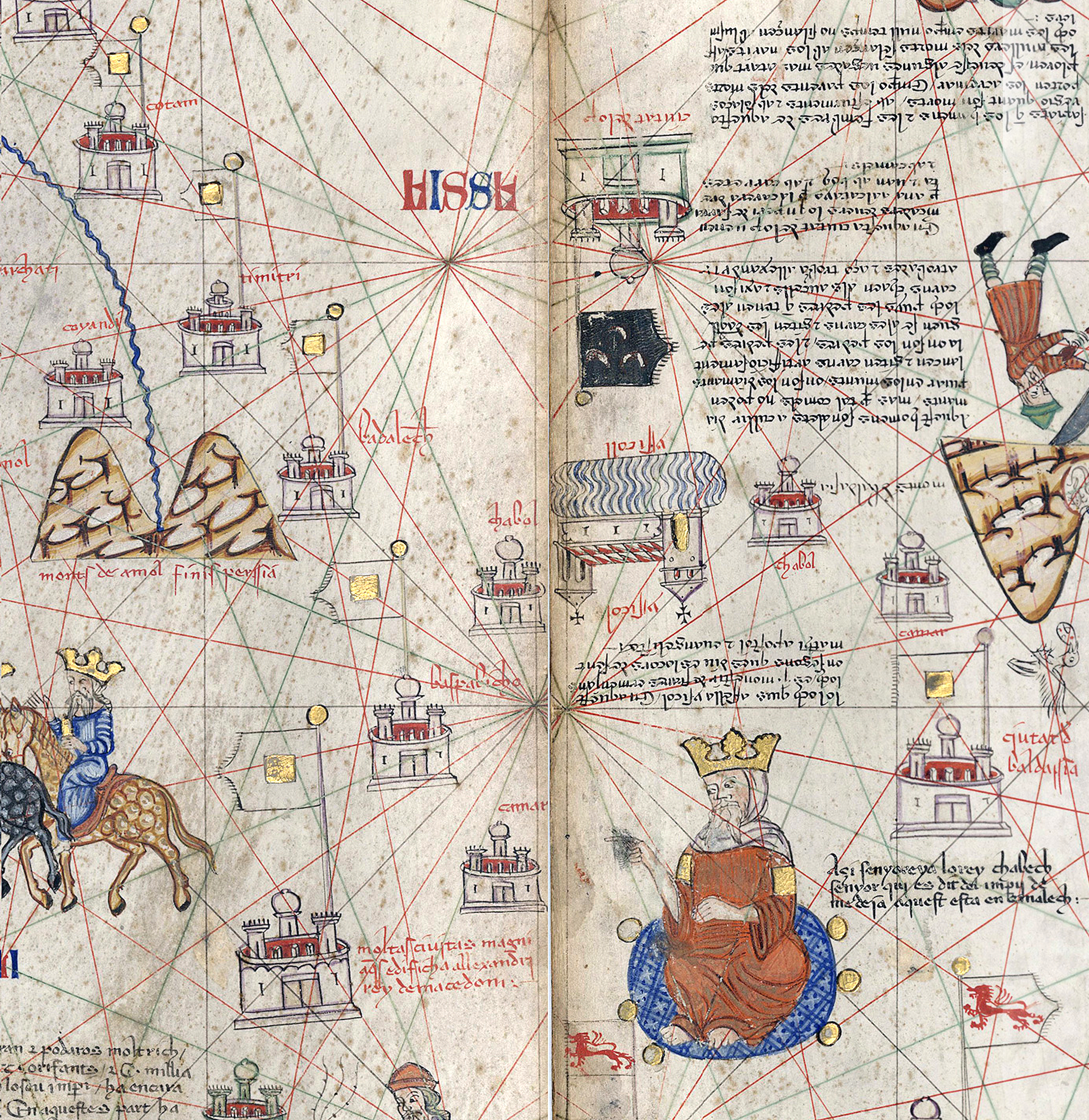
Kingdom of Chagatai in the Catalan Atlas (1375). The Khan Kebek is depicted with the caption: Here reigns the King Chabech (Kebek), lord of the Medeja [Media] Empire. He resides at Emalech (Almaliq). His cities appear with the Chagatai flag ( (Chagatai Khanate) ).

Almaliq (Uyghur: ئالمالىق; Chinese: 阿力麻里; pinyin: Ālìmálǐ), also spelled Almalik, Almalig, was a medieval city in the Ili basin in present-day Huocheng County, Xinjiang, China along Kazakhstan border. A modern town named Alimali (阿力玛里) in Khorgas, adjacent to Huocheng, has no historical connections with the medieval town.

== History ==
Almaliq was originally one of Karluk cities in the Turkic Kaganates. It is known from the accounts of the Persian historians and Chinese travelers of the Mongol era (13th to 15th centuries), in particular the 13th-century Daoist Qiu Chuji (Chang Chun).

According to the travel notes of Genghis Khan's chief adviser Yelü Chucai, the city of Almaliq was situated between the Tian Shan mountains and the Ili River. There were many crab apple trees around Almalik. The native people called them "almaliq", thus giving the name to the city.

An account by a Persian historian tells that in 1211, Prince Ozar of Almaliq acknowledged the supremacy of Genghis Khan. The king was later killed by the Gurkhan of Karakitai. Genghis Khan ordered the king's son Siknak Tekin to succeed him as king of Almaliq and gave him the only daughter of his elder son Jochi for marriage. In 1219, when Genghis Khan led his host on campaign to Persia, Siknak Tekin followed him.

The marriage between the ruler of Almaliq and a granddaughter of Genghis Khan demonstrates the city's importance at the time. Home to people from a variety of ethnic backgrounds and religions, the city became an important Islamic center under the rule of Tughluq Temur, Khan of Moghulistan, from c. 1351 to 1363. Tughluq Temür's tomb can still be seen in the town. Inscriptions also show the presence of Nestorian Christians in the town in the third quarter of the fourteenth century. In 1254, King Het'um I of Cilician Armenia passed through Almaliq en route to the Mongol court at Karakorum, noting the presence of Nestorian Christian communities in the region, including at the nearby town of Ilibalyk, which also preserves Nestorian graves and inscriptions.

A number of Catholic missionaries worked in Almaliq in the 14th century as well, including Giovanni de' Marignolli. Like him, many Europeans in Medieval China stopped there while traveling. In June 1339, six monks, a bishop, and a Genoese merchant were killed by order of the Khan Ali, the sultan of the region, who had recently assassinated the previous ruler Yesun-Timur Khan. The city was typically known as "Armalec" in their accounts.

Almalik was capital of the Chagatai Khanate

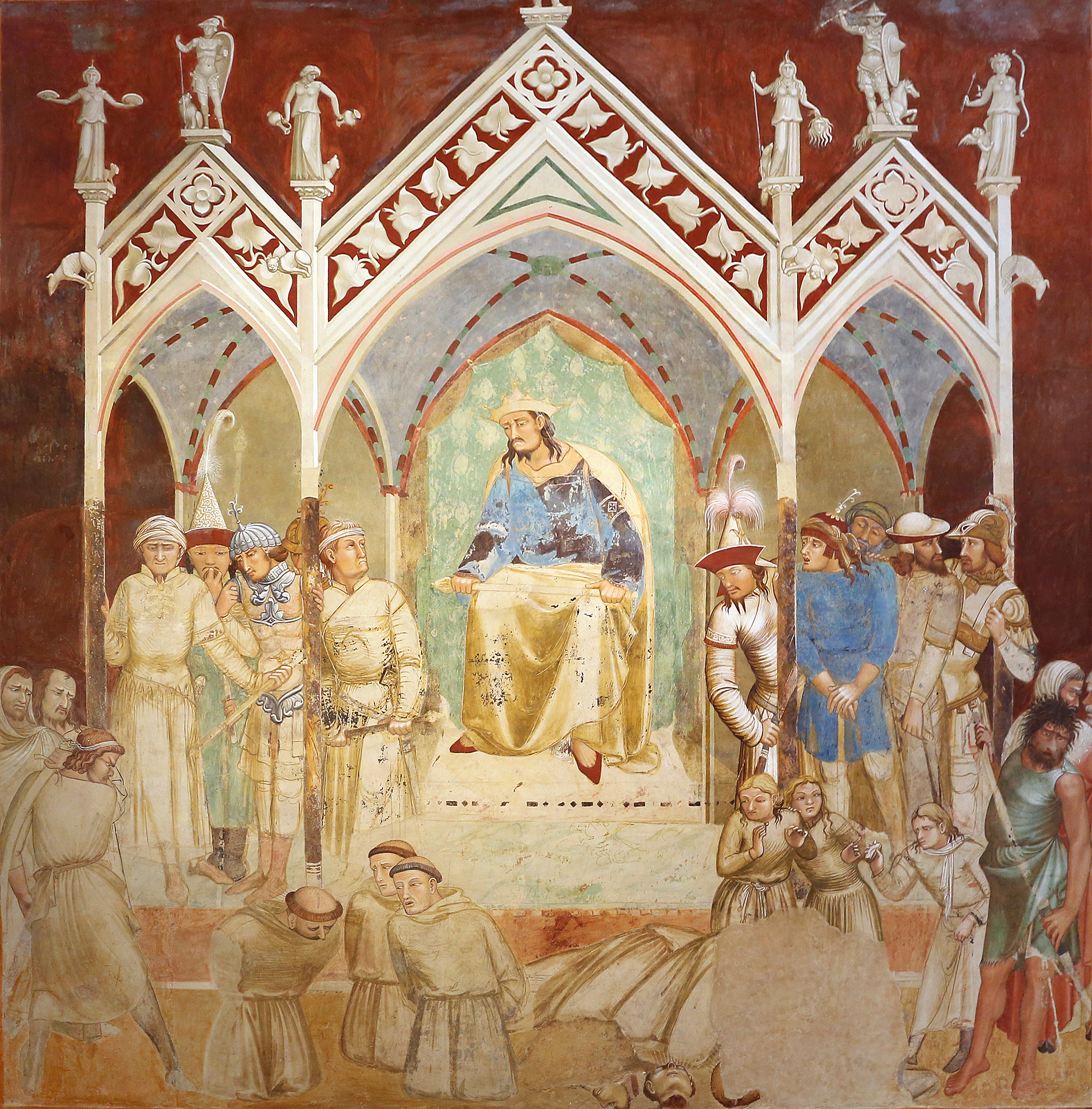
The Martyrdom of the Franciscans, by Ambrogio Lorenzetti, took place in Almalik in 1339.

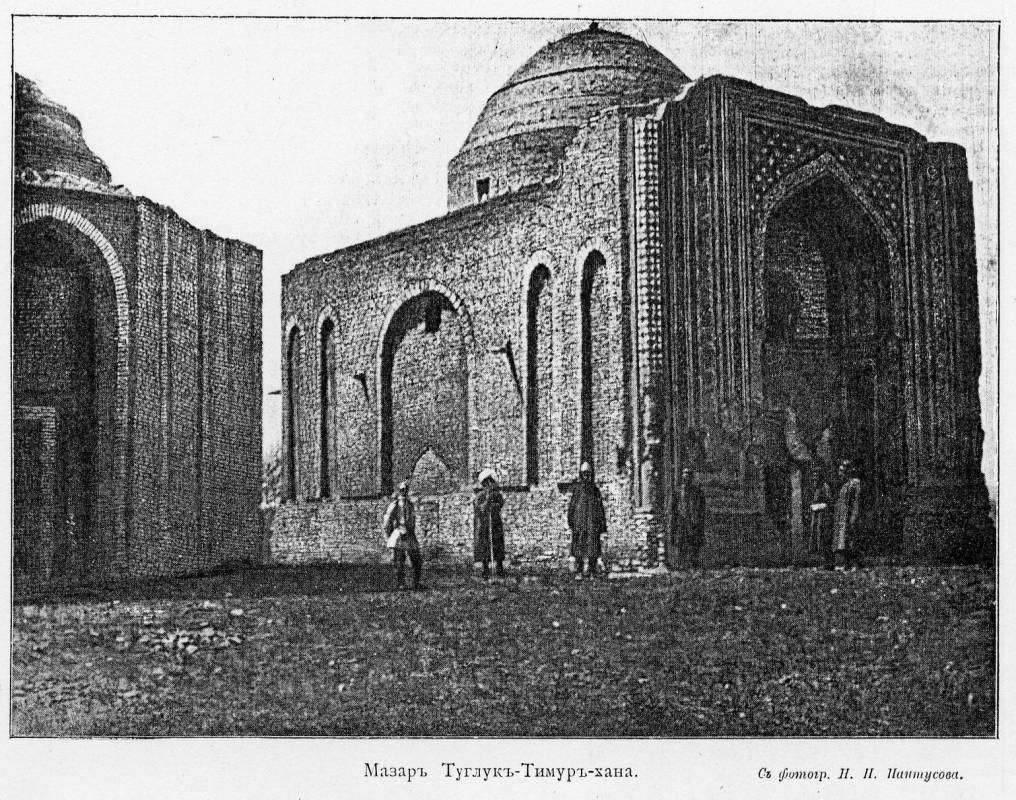
Tughlugh Timur (r.1360–1363) mausoleum, Almaliq, Xinjiang

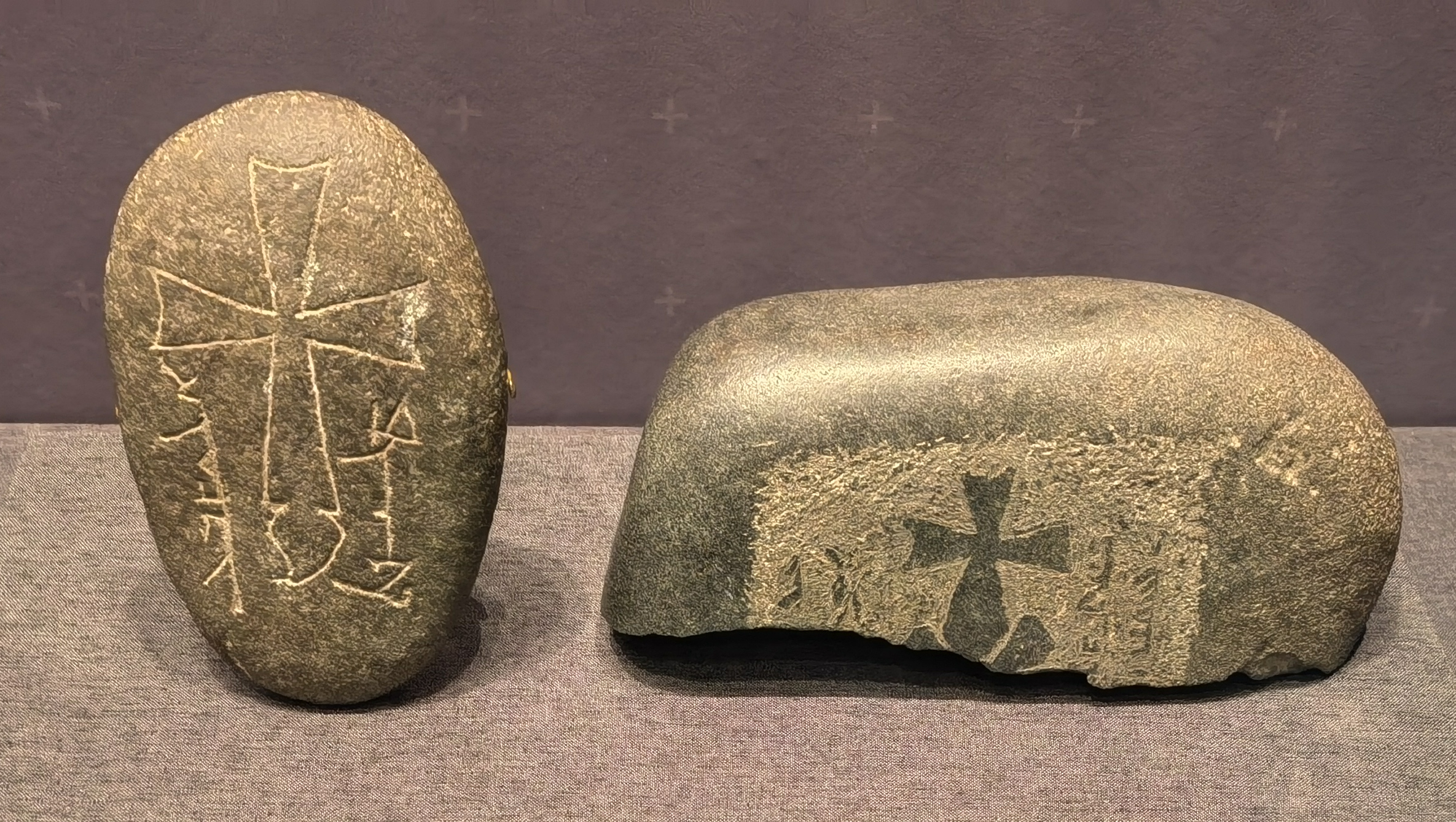
Alimali Nestorian steles, Yuan dynasty period (1206-1368). Xinjiang Museum
