= Yesun Temur =

Yesun Temur may refer to:

- Yesün Temür (Yuan dynasty) (1293–1328), an emperor of the Yuan dynasty of China
- Yesun Temur (Chagatai Khanate) (reigned 1337–1339), Khan of the Chagatai Khanate
