= Ilibalyk =

Medieval Silk Road city in modern southeast Kazakhstan

- Ilanbalyk, Ilibaly
- Location within Kazakhstan
- Interactive map of Ilibalyk
- 44°07′14″N 79°53′04″E
- Type: Medieval city
- Periods: 9th-14th centuries
- Cultures: Karakhanid, Chagatai, Church of the East, Islam
- Location: Panfilov District, Jetisu Region, Kazakhstan

Site notes
- Area: 5 km^{2} (1.9 sq mi)
- Excavation dates: 2016-present

Ilibalyk ('i:lɪbɑlɪk), also spelled Ilanbalyk or Ilibaly, was a major medieval Silk Road city in the Ili River valley of present-day southeastern Kazakhstan. Occupied from the 9th through the 14th centuries, the site comprises a fortified administrative core (shahristān), extensive suburbs (rābāds), and a large contemporary Nestorian necropolis.

== Etymology ==
The name “Ilibalyk” derives from Turkic "Ili-balyq", literally “city on the Ili (River).” Medieval Persian and Armenian chronicles record variants such as Ilanbalyk and Ilibaly.

== Location and geography ==
Ilibalyk is located near the modern village of Usharal (Üsharal), Panfilov District, Jetisu Region, approximately 45 kilometres (28 mi) north of the present Ili River channel. The site spans some 5 km² of floodplain and a low ridge, commanding a route through the northern Tien Shan corridor.

== Historical context ==
From the 9th century, Ilibalyk lay within the eastern frontier of the Turkic Karakhanid realm; following the Mongol conquests it formed part of the Chagatai Khanate. Contemporary travelers, including Armenian King Hetum I (1255), mention Ilibalyk as a fortified riverine caravanserai and market town on the route between Central Asia and Almaliq in China.

== Archaeological research ==
=== Discovery and survey ===
A carved Church of the East gravestone discovered in 2014 near Usharal, Kazakhstan prompted a systematic archaeological survey of the site. Since 2016, annual field campaigns have investigated the medieval city's core, including a fortified shahristān (approximately 380 x 350 m) and surrounding rābāds. Excavations have also documented a Christian necropolis measuring roughly 60 x 70 m, with over 110 graves excavated to date, as well as the remains of an associated funerary chapel.

=== Necropolis (Nestorian cemetery) ===
Excavations beginning in 2016 uncovered an extensive medieval cemetery outside the western wall, with over 110 graves excavated to date (estimated total ~500). All burials adhere to east-west alignment, typifying Church of the East funerary practice; several contained grave goods (beads, bracelets, occasional silver pendants).

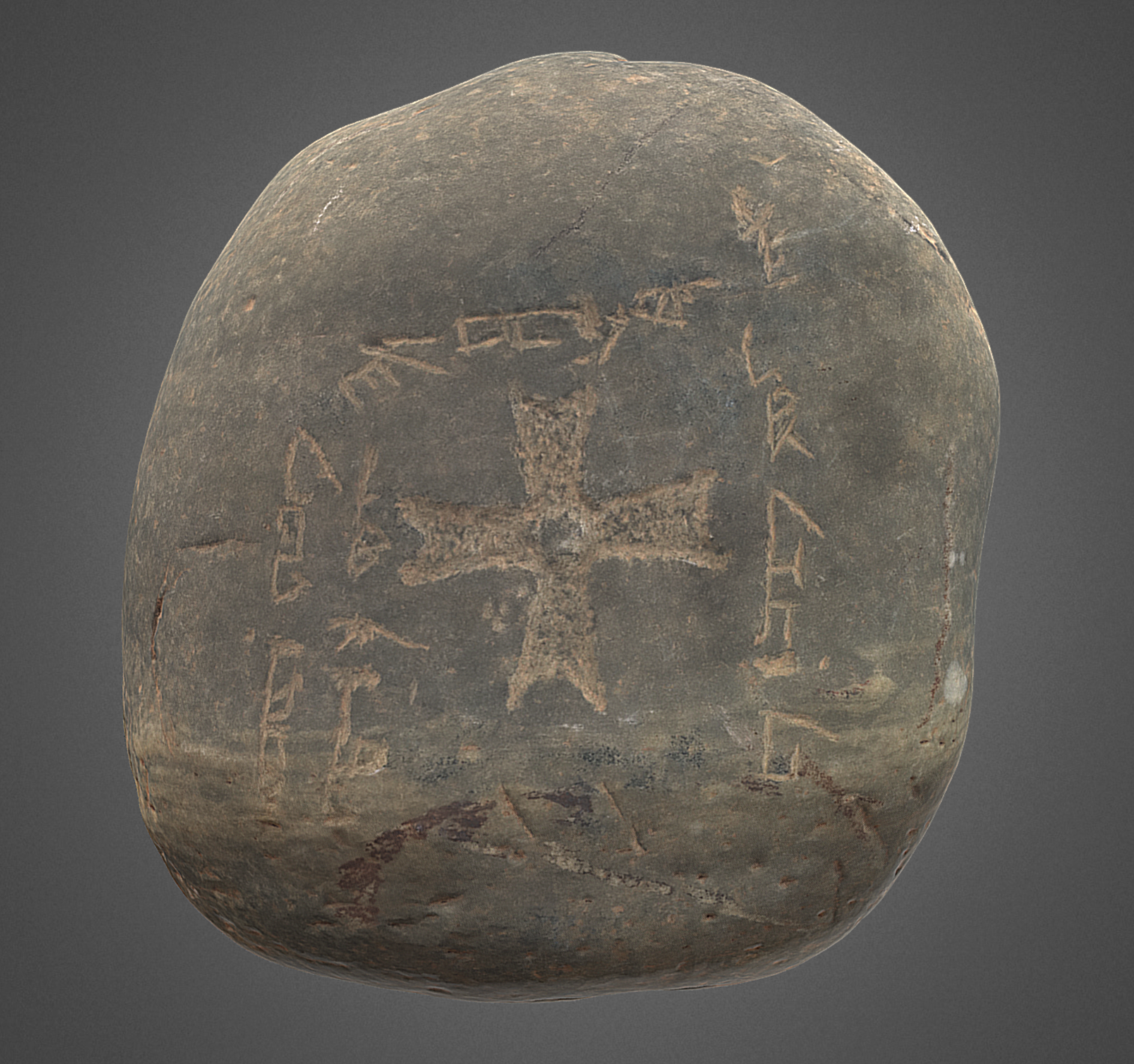
Kayrak grave marker with Syriac inscriptions found at Ilibalyk near Zharkent, Kazakhstan

Fifty-five grave markers (kayrāks) have been found bearing variants of the Nestorian cross, a few with Syriac inscriptions, some transliterating Old Turkic or Persian. A mud brick funerary chapel structure adjacent to the graves suggests communal liturgical activity. DNA and radiocarbon analyses are underway to determine the cemetery's demographic composition and chronology.

=== Material culture ===
Surface collection and trenching have yielded:

- Numismatics: ~175 coins, predominantly Karakhanid (12th c.) and Chagatai (13th-14th c.), including issues from Almalyk (capital of the Chagatai Khanate)
- Ceramics: Glazed wares, unglazed tablewares, lamps, vessels, dating 11th-14th c.
- Metallurgy: Iron tools (knife blades, horse fittings) and small silver ornaments.
- Jewelry: Beads, bracelets, rings, earings.
- Textile: Boqtaq-style headdress.

=== Architecture and bathhouse ===
Excavations of the shahristān revealed mudbrick ramparts (original height up to 6 m) and a monumental bathhouse (hamām) built with fired bricks and hypocaust heating. Adjacent ceramic kilns attest to on-site brick production during the Karakhanid-Chagatai period.

== Significance ==
Ilibalyk is one of the largest medieval sites in Zhetysu, illuminating Silk Road urbanism, Turkic-Mongol statecraft and the eastward spread of Church of the East Christianity. Its multi-ethnic material record add to current understanding of cultural interconnections in 13th-14th c. Central Asia.

== See also ==
- Church of the East
- Silk Road
- Turco-Mongol tradition
