= Buzan (Mongol khan) =

Mongolian monarch

Khan of Chagatai Khanate
- Reign: 1333–1334
- Predecessor: Tarmashirin
- Successor: Changshi
- Born: unknown
- Died: 1334
- House: Mongol Dynasty
- Religion: Tengrism

Buzan (alt. Buzun) was khan of the Chagatai Khanate from 1333 to 1334 (or from 1334 to 1335). He was the son of Duwa Temür.

Following the death of his uncle Tarmashirin, Buzan took control of the khanate. He is described by Ibn Battuta as a Muslim, though he apparently favored the traditional Mongol yasa law over the Sharia. After only a short time as khan, however, he was overthrown in 1335 by his pagan cousin Changshi.

| Preceded by Tarmashirin | Khan of Chagatai Khanate; 1334–1335 | Succeeded by Changshi |
