= Tarmashirin =

Mongol ruler of Central Asia

Khan of Chagatai Khanate
- Reign: 1331–1334
- Predecessor: Duwa Temür
- Successor: Buzan
- Born: unknown
- Died: 1334
- House: Borjigin
- Father: Duwa Khan
- Religion: Islam

Ala-ad-din Tarmashirin Khan (Chagatai and Persian: علاء الدین; ruled 1331 AD - 1334 AD) was the khan of the Chagatai Khanate following Duwa Timur.

== Biography ==
Tarmashirin was among the sons of Duwa Khan. He is famous for his campaign in the Indian subcontinent in 1327 before he was enthroned. He sacked the city of Lahore in the year 1329. He unsuccessfully invaded the Ilkhanate.

He was one of the first notable rulers of the Chagatai Khanate to convert to Islam. He took the name Ala-ad-din after becoming a Muslim. His conversion to Islam did not go down well with his Mongol nobles, who were overwhelmingly Tengriist and Buddhist. He sent letters with tributes to the court of Yuan Dynasty. Because Tarmarshirin preferred to dwell in cities of Transoxiana, he was accused of abandoning the traditional Mongol code of conduct, Yassa, and was deposed in the horde's annual kurultai. He was killed by the Eastern Chagatayid princes later in flight near Samarkand.

Muslim sources have always portrayed Tarmashirin in a very favorable light owing to his seminal effort in bringing Islam into eastern Asia. The famous Muslim explorer and scholar Ibn Batuta had visited the khan during his travel through Tarmashirin's realms.

== Sources ==
- Biran, M. (2002). "The Chaghadaids and Islam: The Conversion of Tarmashirin Khan (1331-34)". Journal of the American Oriental Society. 122 (4): 742–752. doi:10.2307/3217613. JSTOR 3217613.

Preceded by Duwa Temür	Khan of Chagatai Khanate; 1331–1334	Succeeded by Buzan
