= Changshi =

Khan of the Chagatai Khanate from 1335 to 1337

Khan of the Chagatai Khanate
- Reign: 1335–1337
- Predecessor: Buzan
- Successor: Yesun Temur
- Born: unknown
- Died: 1337
- House: Borjigin
- Father: Ebugen
- Religion: Tengrism

Changshi (Chinese: 敞失; pinyin: Chǎngshī; r. 1335–1337) was one of the last effective khans of the Chagatai Khanate. His father was prince Ebugen who was the son of Duwa, the Chagatai Khan.

Changshi was a ruler of the Chagatai Khanate from approximately 1335 to 1337 or 1338. He is noted for his tolerance toward Nestorian Christians, allowing missionaries to preach, repairing churches, and granting land for a friary, which prompted a letter from Pope Benedict XII in 1338 thanking him for his support. However, there is no definitive evidence that Changshi personally converted to Nestorianism, and he likely adhered to traditional Mongol practices such as the Yasa and Tengriism.

The circumstances of his death or deposition are unclear, with no primary sources confirming assassination. He was succeeded by his younger brother, Yesun Temur.

Preceded by Buzan	Khan of Chagatai Khanate; 1335–1337	Succeeded by Yesun Temur
