= 'Ali-Sultan =

Khan of the Chagatai Khanate

Ali Sultan
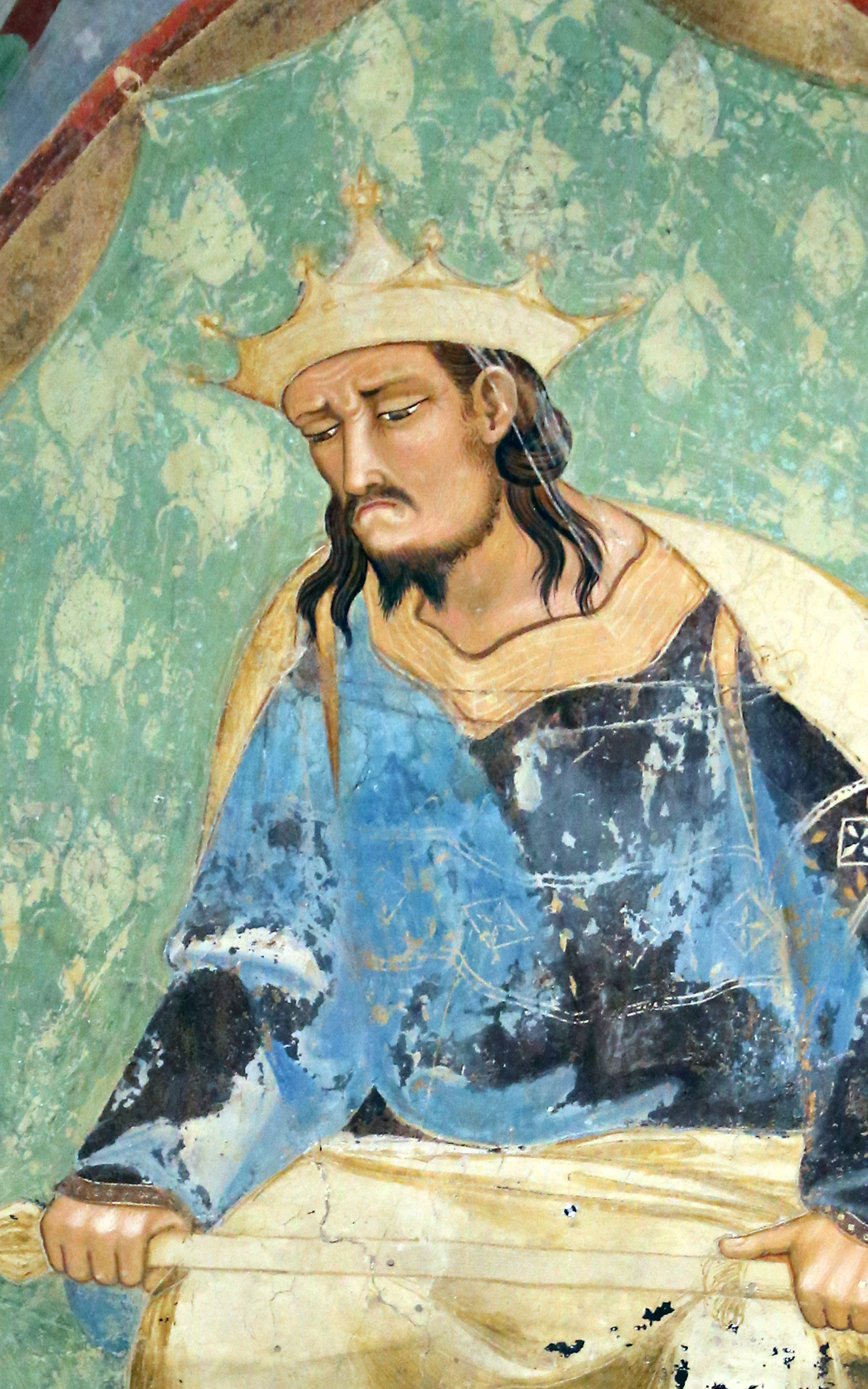
- Ali Sultan, as depicted by Ambrogio Lorenzetti in The Martyrdom of the Franciscans in 1342

Khan of Chagatai Khanate
- Reign: 1339-1342
- Predecessor: Yesun Temur
- Successor: Muhammad I ibn Pulad
- Died: 1342

'Ali Khalil (Chagatai and Persian: علی خلیل), also known as Ali-Sultan (Chagatai and Persian: علی سلطان), was the khan (r.1339-1342) of the Chagatai Khanate. He was a descendant of Kadan, son of the second Great Khan Ögedei.

'Ali attacked the ordo (palace) of Yesun Temur and usurped the throne. He was the first and last one who had restored the Ögedeid authority over the Chagatai Khanate since the reigns of Kaidu and his son Chapar. During his reign, Islam fully absorbed the Chagatai Mongols and 'Ali persecuted followers of other religions. He is the one who ordered the killing of six Franciscan friars at Almalik in 1339, as depicted in The Martyrdom of the Franciscans, by Ambrogio Lorenzetti.

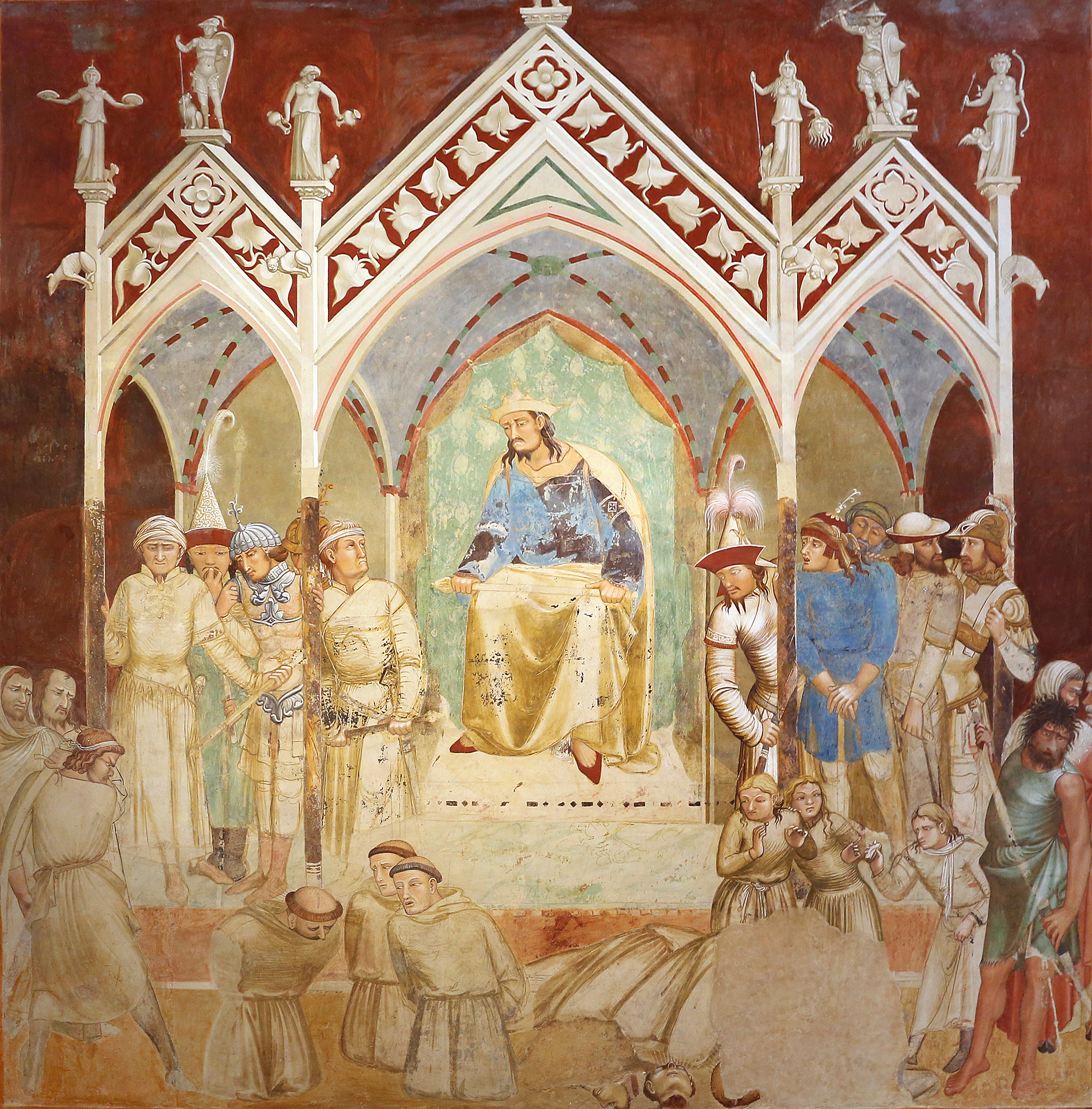
The Martyrdom of the Franciscans, painted by Ambrogio Lorenzetti in 1342, took place in Almaliq in 1339. The central ruler who ordered the killing was Ali Sultan.

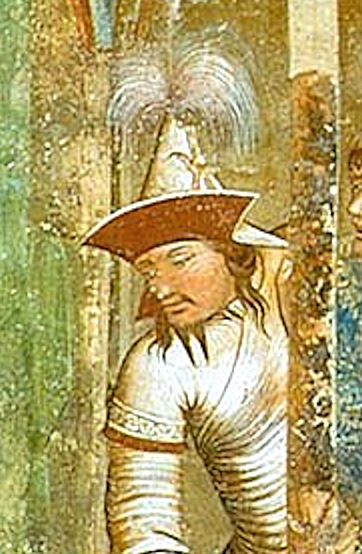
Mongol tumen commander.

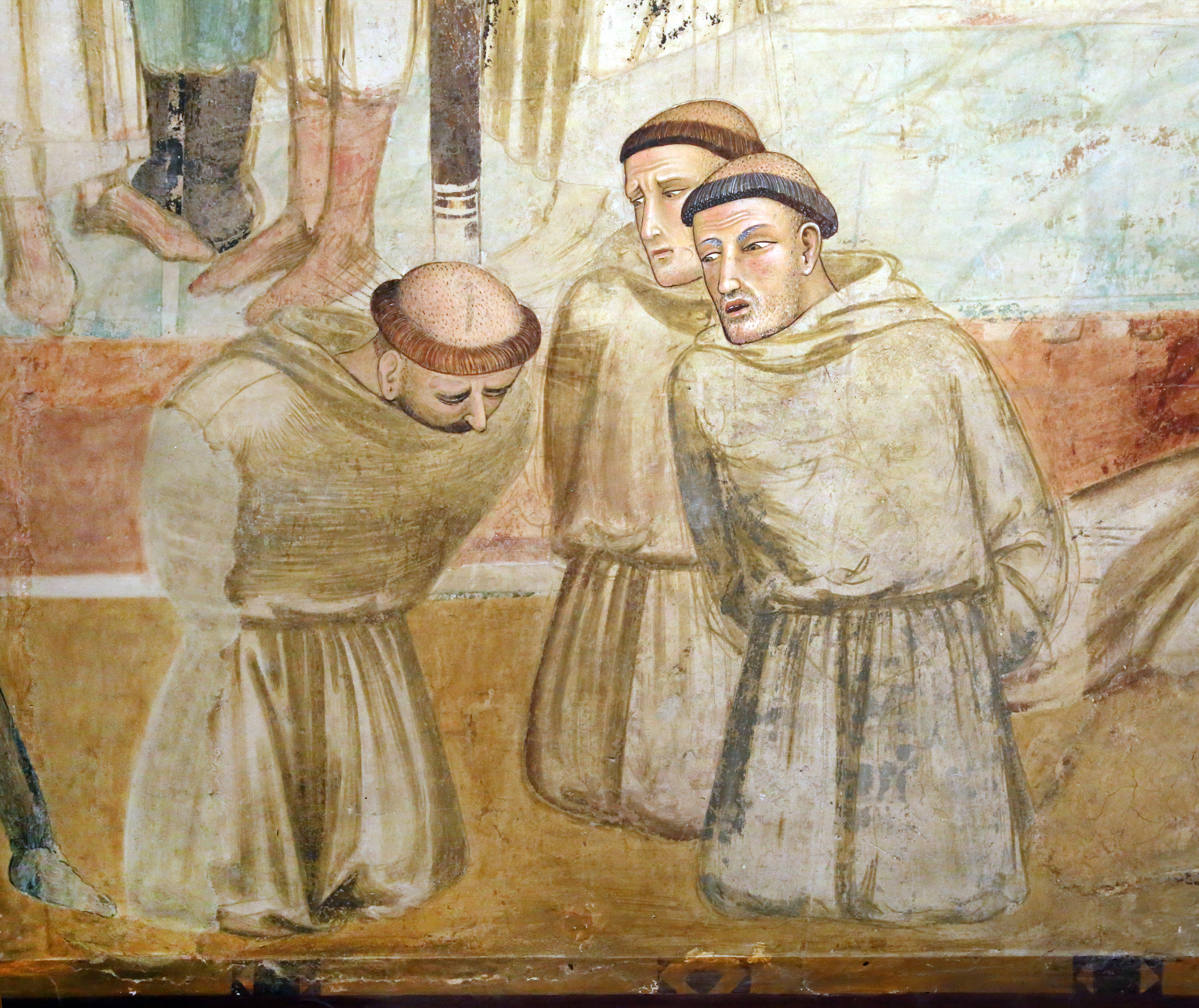
Martyrdom of five Franciscan friars

'Ali-Sultan House of Ögedei
| Preceded by Yesun Temur | Khan of Chagatai Khanate; 1339-1342 | Succeeded by Muhammad I ibn Pulad |
