= Chagatai Khanate =

13th–14th-century Mongol khanate in Central Asia

- 1227–1347 (whole); 1347–1403 (western); 1347–1462 (eastern)
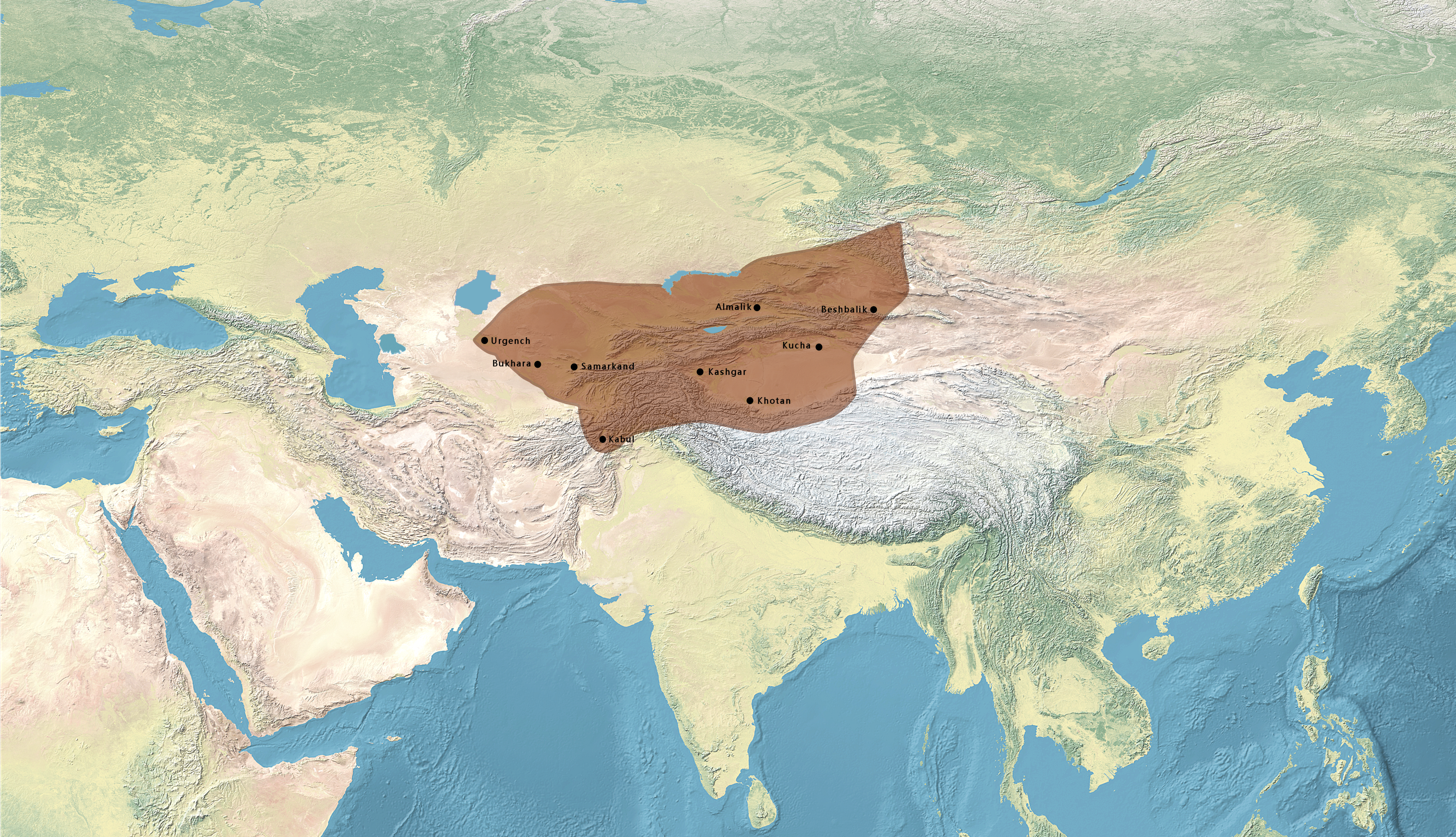
- The Chagatai Khanate, with contemporary polities circa 1300, before the expansion of the Timurid Empire into Transoxiana from 1363.

- The Chagatai Khanate and its neighbors in the late 13th century
- Status: Administrative region of the Mongol Empire (1227–1266); Independent Khanate (1266–1347)
- Capital: Almaliq, Qarshi
- Common languages: Middle Mongol (dynastic, documents, literary); Persian (lingua franca, administration, bureaucracy and literature); Chagatai Turkic (literary, spoken); Arabic (religion and jurisprudence)
- Religion: Buddhism (until 1326); Tengrism (until 1326); Sunni Islam (from 1326)
- Demonyms: Chagatai, Mongol
- Government: Semi-elective monarchy, later hereditary monarchy
- Khan
  - 1225–1242: Chagatai Khan
- Legislature: Kurultai
- Historical era: Late Middle Ages
  - Chagatai Khan inherited part of Mongol Empire: 1227
  - Death of Chagatai: 1242
  - Chagatai Khanate split between west and east (Moghulistan): 1340s
  - Western portion annexed by Timur: 1363
  - Moghulistan split into the Yarkent Khanate in the west and the Turpan Khanate in the east: 1487
  - Turpan Khanate disappeared: 1660s
  - Yarkent Khanate conquered by Dzungar Khanate: 1705
  - Disestablished: 1347

Area
- 1310 or 1350 est.: 3,400,000 km^{2} (1,300,000 sq mi)
- Currency: Coins (dirhams, Kebek, and pūl)
Preceded by	Succeeded by
Mongol Empire	Moghulistan; Timurid Empire
- Today part of: Uzbekistan; China; Mongolia

The Chagatai Khanate, also known as the Chagatai Ulus, was a Mongol khanate that comprised the lands ruled by Chagatai Khan, second son of Genghis Khan, and his descendants and successors. Over time, its Mongol ruling groups underwent a gradual and uneven process of linguistic and cultural Turkification and Islamization, though Mongolian political and administrative traditions remained important. The Mongolian language continued to be used for official documents into the 14th century; Tughlugh Timur and Ilyas Khoja, the first Chaghatayid rulers of Moghulistan, still issued royal edicts in Mongolian. With the division of the Mongol Empire after 1259, it became a functionally separate khanate. At its height in the late 13th century, the khanate extended from the Amu Darya south of the Aral Sea to the Altai Mountains on the border of modern-day Mongolia and China, roughly corresponding to the area once ruled by the Qara Khitai (Western Liao dynasty).

Initially, the rulers of the Chagatai Khanate recognized the supremacy of the Great Khan, but by the reign of Kublai Khan, Ghiyas-ud-din Baraq no longer obeyed the emperor's orders while recognizing the nominal suzerainty of the Yuan dynasty in 1303. From 1363, the Chagatais progressively lost Transoxiana to the Timurids. The reduced realm came to be known as Moghulistan, which lasted until the late 15th century, when it broke off into the Yarkent Khanate and the Turpan Khanate. In 1680, the remaining Chagatai domains lost their independence to the Dzungar Khanate. Finally, the Kumul Khanate, an autonomous division of China established during the Qing dynasty in 1696 and governed by descendants of Chagatai Khan, was abolished during the Republic of China in 1930, ending the dynasty.

== Name ==
The Chagatai Khanate was also known as the Dumdadu Mongγol Ulus (the Middle Mongolian Empire). For example, Giovanni de' Marignolli, who visited the Yuan dynasty in the 1340s, referred to Almaliq (the capital of the Chagatai Khanate) as "Almalek of the Middle Empire (Imperium Medium)". In addition, the Catalan Atlas of 1375 refers to the area corresponding to Chagatai Khanate as "Imperium Medorum", a possible alternate name of "Imperium Medium". In addition to the Latin sources mentioned above, Ibn Battuta records in Arabic that "His country [is in] the middle between the four of the powerful kings on the earth, i.e., King of Great Mongol, King of India, King of Iraq, and King Özbeg". This description suggests that the Chagatai Khanate was called the "Middle Empire" because it was located exactly in the middle of Eurasia.

A potential self-designation Dumdadu Mongγol Ulus ('Middle Mongolian Empire') has been discovered in a damaged Uighur script document excavated from Turfan. A reading [dum]dadu mongγol ulus, as first proposed by Ligeti (1971), is supported by Matsui Dai. He argues this reading based on the example of "Middle Empire (Imperium Medium)". Matsui proposed that "it seems probable that Du’a or his descendants took the brand-new official state name Dumdadu Mongγol Ulus in order to affirm that their polity was renewed, as did the emperor Qubilai, who in 1271 adopted the official state name Dai Ön Yeke Mongγol Ulus.

== History ==
=== Vassal of the Great Khan (1227–1266) ===
When Genghis Khan died in 1227, his son Chagatai Khan inherited the regions roughly corresponding to the defunct Qara Khitai Empire: Issyk-Kul, Ili River, Chu River, Talas River, Transoxania, and the Tarim Basin. Chagatai was not fully independent in his khanate, however, and still received orders from Karakorum. When he dismissed the governor of Transoxania, Mahmud Yalavach, Ögedei Khan reinstated Mahmud, whose dynasty continued to administer the region even after the death of Chagatai. In 1238 there was a Muslim uprising in Bukhara, but Mahmud's son Mas'ud crushed it the next year before Mongol troops were able to arrive, thereby saving the populace from Mongol vengeance.

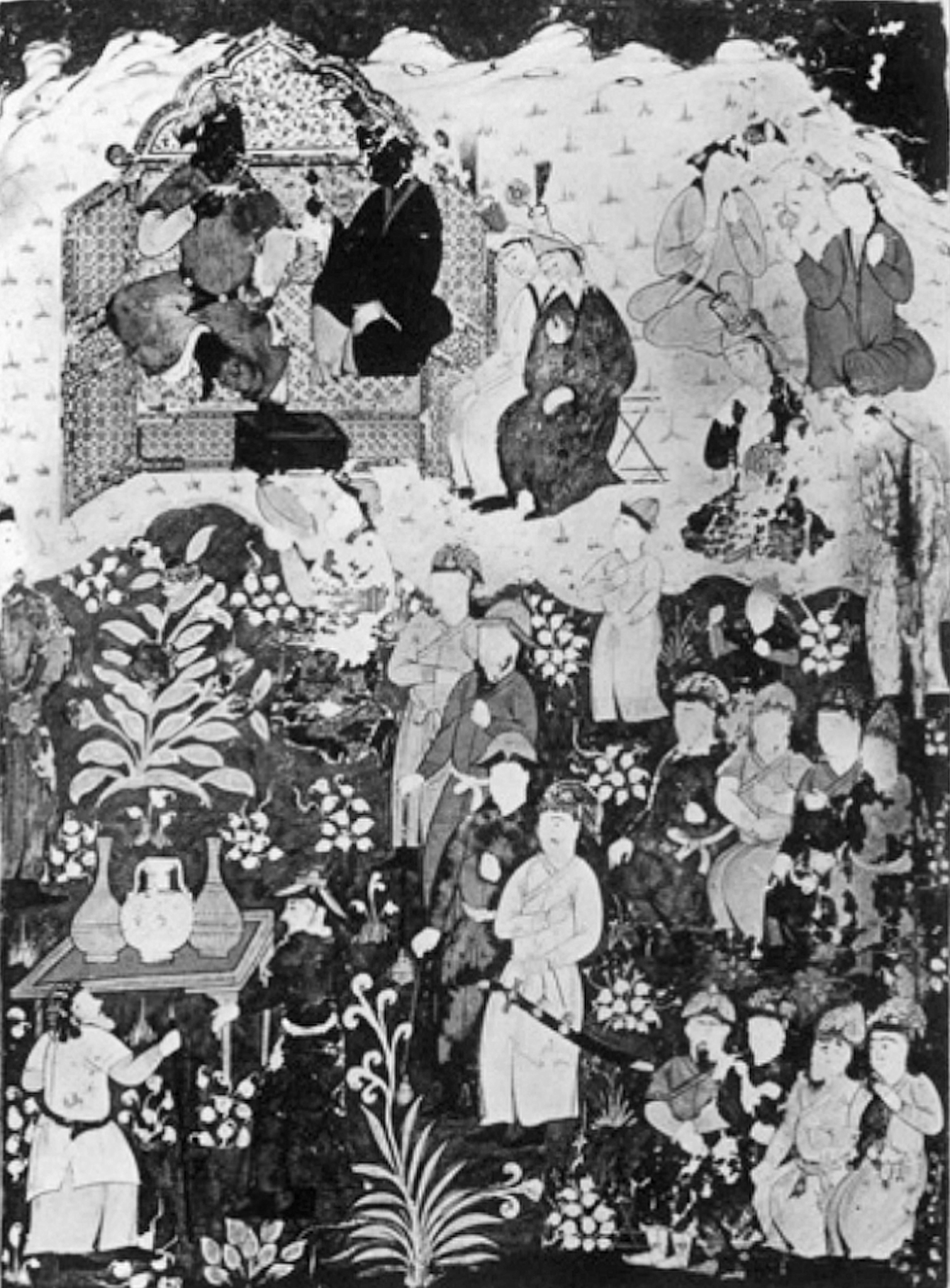
The Chagatay Khan and His Consort, Jāmiʿ al-tavārīkh of Rashid al-Din, Iran, late 14th century.

Chagatai Khan died in 1242 and was succeeded by his grandson, Qara Hülegü. He was too young to rule independently, so the widowed khatun Ebuskun ruled as regent in his place. In 1246, Güyük Khan replaced him with one of his uncles, Yesü Möngke.

Yesü Möngke came to power because he was a personal friend of Güyük Khan. He was a drunkard who left the affairs of the state to his wife and minister Beha ad-Din Marghinani. In 1252 he was deposed by Möngke Khan, who installed Qara Hülegü again.

Qara Hülegü died on his way home and was succeeded by his son, Mubarak Shah.

Mubarak Shah was too young to rule, and state affairs were managed by his mother, Orghana. In 1260, Ariq Böke replaced Mubarak Shah with Alghu, a grandson of Chagatai Khan. Alghu rebelled against Ariq Böke upon securing power and defected to Kublai Khan's side in the Toluid Civil War. Ariq Böke attacked him, and while Alghu experienced initial success in fending off Ariq Böke's army, was forced to flee to Samarkand in 1263. Ariq Böke devastated the Ili region in his absence. Alghu was able to recruit a new army with the aid of Orghana and Mas'ud Yalavach. He then went on to defeat an invasion by Kaidu and drive out Ariq Böke, who surrendered to Kublai in 1264. Alghu died in 1265, and Orghana placed her son, Mubarak Shah, on the throne once again.

Mubarak Shah was the first Chagatai khan to be converted to Islam. His rule was cut short by his cousin Ghiyas-ud-din Baraq, who deposed him with the support of Kublai Khan.

=== Reign of Kaidu (1266–1301) ===
Ghiyas-ud-din Baraq came into conflict with Kublai Khan on the administration of the Tarim Basin. Baraq drove out an agent sent by Kublai to govern the region, and when Kublai sent a detachment of 6,000 horsemen, Baraq met them with 30,000 men, forcing them to retreat. Baraq also came into conflict with Kaidu, who enlisted the Golden Horde khan Mengu-Timur in attacking Baraq. With a Golden Horde army of 50,000 at his back, Kaidu forced Baraq to flee to Transoxania. In 1267, Baraq accepted peace with Kaidu, and relinquished the territory east of Transoxania. Kaidu then coerced Baraq into invading the Ilkhanate. Baraq attacked first, defeating Prince Buchin, the governor of Khorasan, and brother of Abaqa Khan. Abaqa rushed from Azerbaijan and defeated Baraq near Herat on 22 July 1270, forcing him to retreat. On the way back he fell from his horse and was crippled, so he spent the winter in Bukhara, where he died not long after. He converted to Islam before his death.

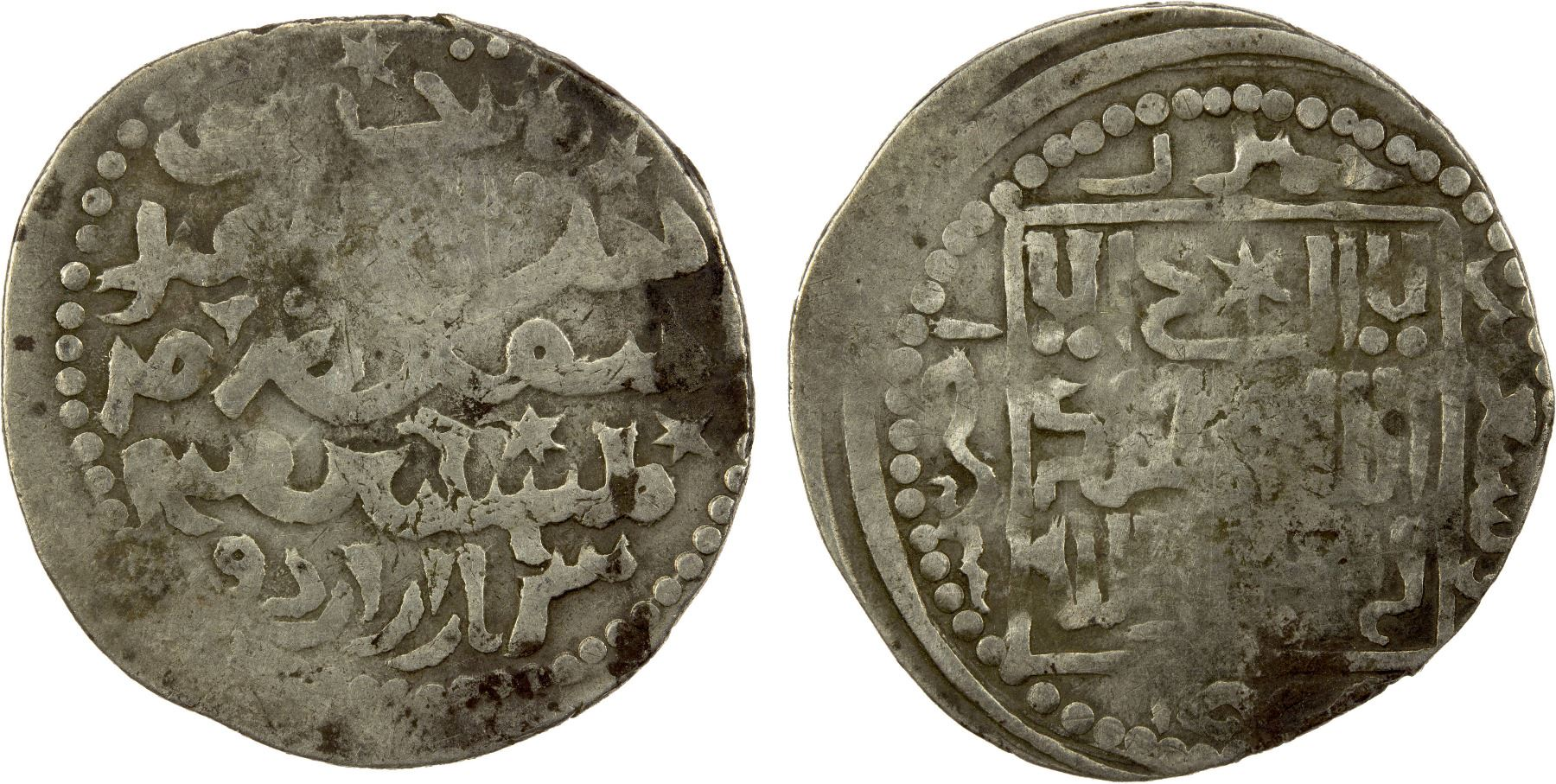
A bilingual Mongol-Arabic silver dirham of Orus, son of Kaidu, dating to the period of the Chaghatayid–Ögedeid occupation of Ilkhanid Khorasan (1290s).

Baraq's four sons and two sons of Alghu rebelled against Kaidu in the wake of Baraq's death, but they were continually defeated. Kaidu enthroned Negübei as the khan in Transoxania. When Negübei rebelled, he was killed and replaced with another khan, Buqa Temür in 1274. It is uncertain when Buqa Temür died, but after that, Baraq's son Duwa was enthroned as khan. Meanwhile, Abaqa invaded Transoxania in 1272 and sacked Bukhara, carrying off 50,000 captives.

In 1275, Duwa joined Kaidu in the war against the Yuan dynasty but was repelled. In 1297, Duwa invaded the Punjab and devastated the region, but was defeated. Several invasions of the Delhi Sultanate also occurred, but none were able to make any headway. In September 1298, Duwa captured Temür Khan's son-in-law, Korguz, and put him to death, but immediately after that suffered a disastrous defeat by Yuan forces. In 1301 they were defeated again in an attack on Karakorum and Kaidu died during the retreat.

=== Foreign wars (1301–1325) ===
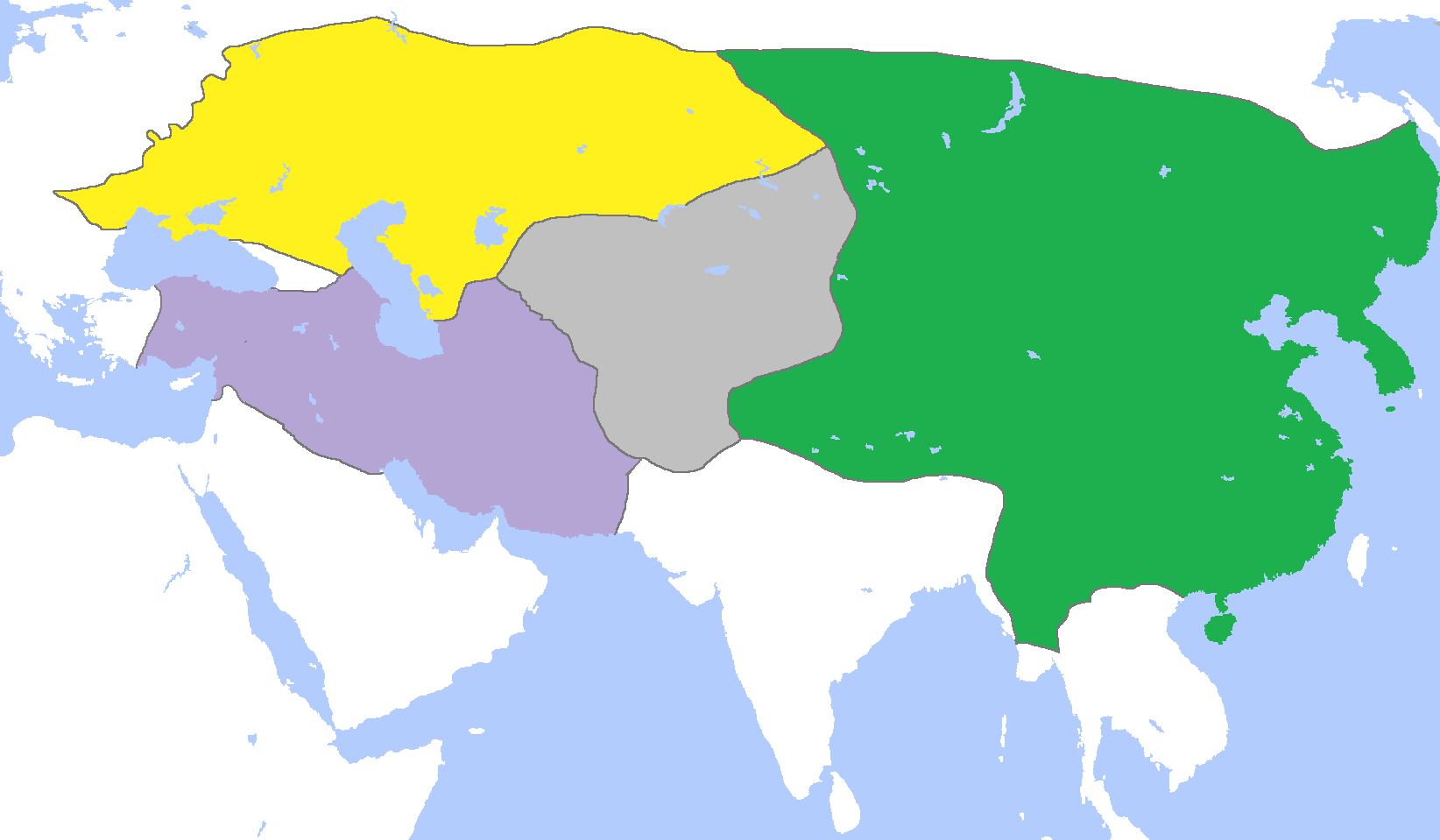
The divisions of the Mongol Empire and main Asian polities, c. 1300

After Kaidu's death in 1301, both Duwa and Kaidu's son Chapar recognized Yuan authority in 1303. However, Duwa threw off his allegiance to Chapar. Both the Yuan dynasty and Duwa attacked Chapar, forcing him to surrender his territory to Duwa in 1306. Meanwhile, Prince Turghai invaded the Delhi Sultanate in 1303 and looted the Delhi region. In 1304 they invaded again but suffered a crushing defeat. Duwa died soon after and was succeeded by his son Könchek, who ruled only for a year and a half before he died. One of Buqa Temür's brothers, Taliqu, seized power, but Duwa's family rebelled and killed him at a banquet. Duwa's younger son Kebek became khan. Kebek invaded the Delhi Sutunate again in 1305, looting the Multan region, but suffered a defeat on the way back. Chapar took advantage of the political turmoil to attack Kebek but was defeated and fled to the Yuan dynasty. Another kuriltai was held in the Chagatai Khanate, which elected another of Duwa's sons, Esen Buqa I, who took the throne ceded by Kebek. In 1315, Esen Buqa invaded the Ilkhanate in support of Duwa's grandson, Dawud Khoja, who had set himself up in eastern Afghanistan. He defeated an Ilkhanate army on the Murgab and reached as far as Herat, but was forced to retreat when the Yuan dynasty attacked him from the east. The Yuan army devastated the Issyk-Kul region. In 1315 the Chagatayid prince Yasa'ur defected to the Ilkhanate, only to rebel, taking Khorasan. Both Chagatai and Ilkhanate forces attacked Yasa'ur. He was killed as he fled. Esen Buqa I died in 1318, at which point Kebek returned to power. He made peace with the Ilkhanate and the Yuan dynasty and reigned until 1325.

=== Religious conflict (1325–1338) ===
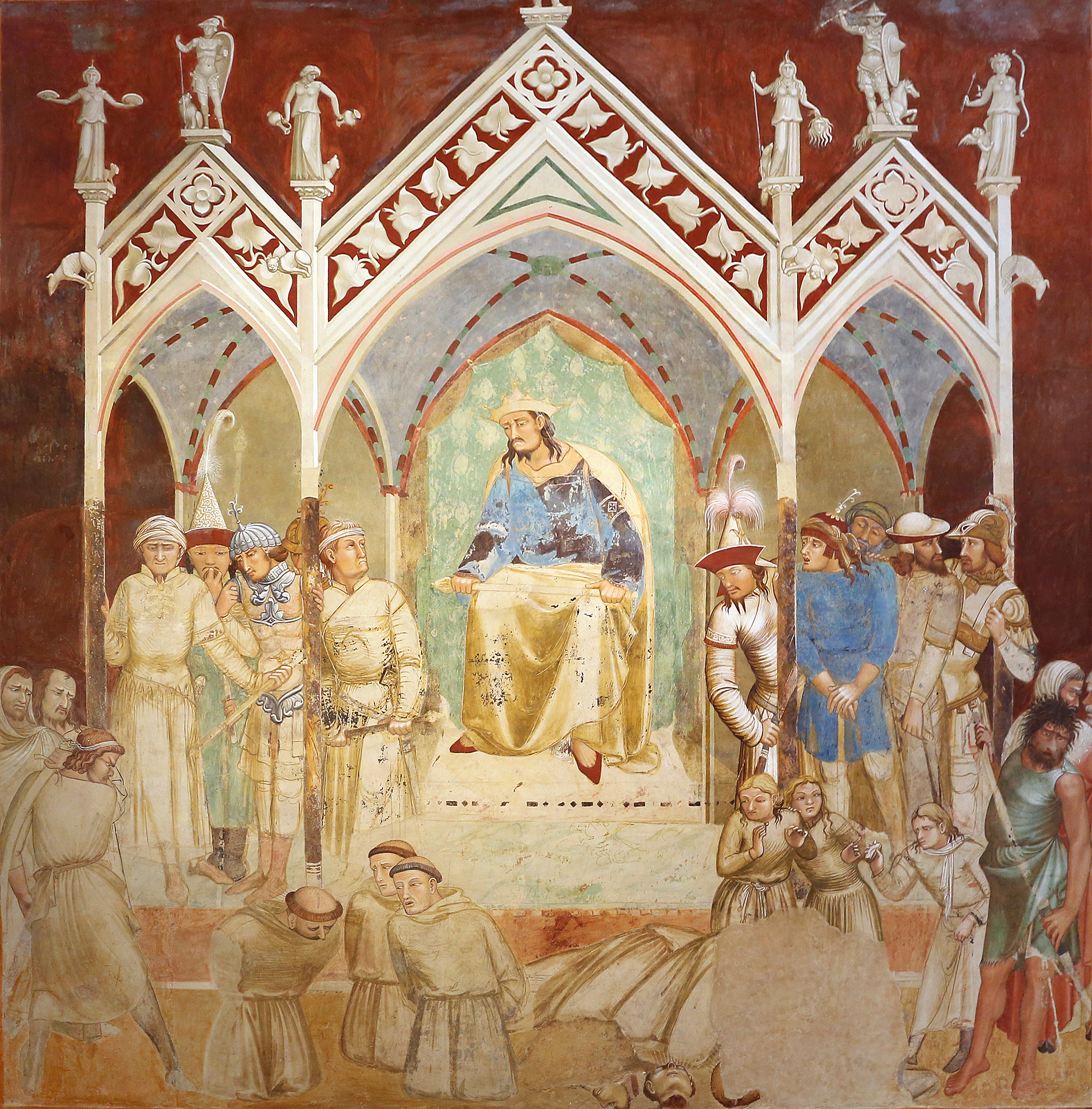
The Martyrdom of the Franciscans, painted in 1342 by Ambrogio Lorenzetti, took place in Almaliq, capital of the Chagatai Khanate, in 1339. The central ruler who ordered the killing was the Chagatai usurper 'Ali-Sultan (r.1339–1342).

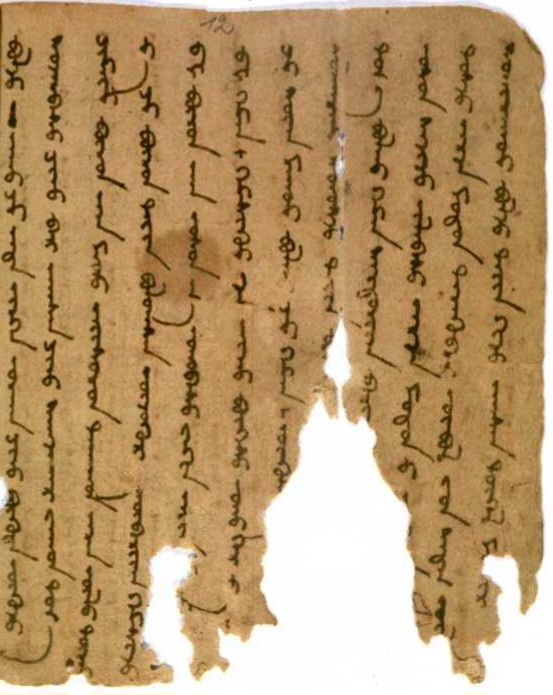
A fragment of a 14th-century Middle Mongolian manuscript of the Alexander Romance, produced in the Chagatai Khanate. In this version, Alexander is called Sulqarnai, a Mongolianized form of the Qur’anic term Dhu al-Qarnayn.

Kebek was succeeded by his three brothers in succession. Eljigidey and Duwa Temür each reigned for only a few months. Tarmashirin (1326–1334) converted to Islam and raided the Delhi Sultanate, reaching as far as Delhi. Tarmashirin was brought down by an anti-Muslim rebellion of the eastern tribes. A son of Duwa, Changshi, was enthroned in 1335. One of his sons was baptized.

Pope Benedict XII appointed the Franciscan bishop Richard of Burgundy to Almalik in 1339. But during the reign of 'Ali-Sultan, Islam fully absorbed the Chagatai Mongols and 'Ali persecuted non-Muslim religions. He is the one who ordered the extermination of the Franciscan congregation at Almaliq, and the killing of six Franciscan monks in 1339 (including bishop Richard of Burgundy, Pascal of Spain, Raymond of Provence and three others), as depicted in the 1342 painting The Martyrdom of the Franciscans, by Ambrogio Lorenzetti.

Giovanni de' Marignolli, a papal legate, arrived in the Ili valley the following year on his way to the Yuan dynasty. He built a church and baptized some people during his stay, and the presence of Christianity lasted until the end of the Mongol era.

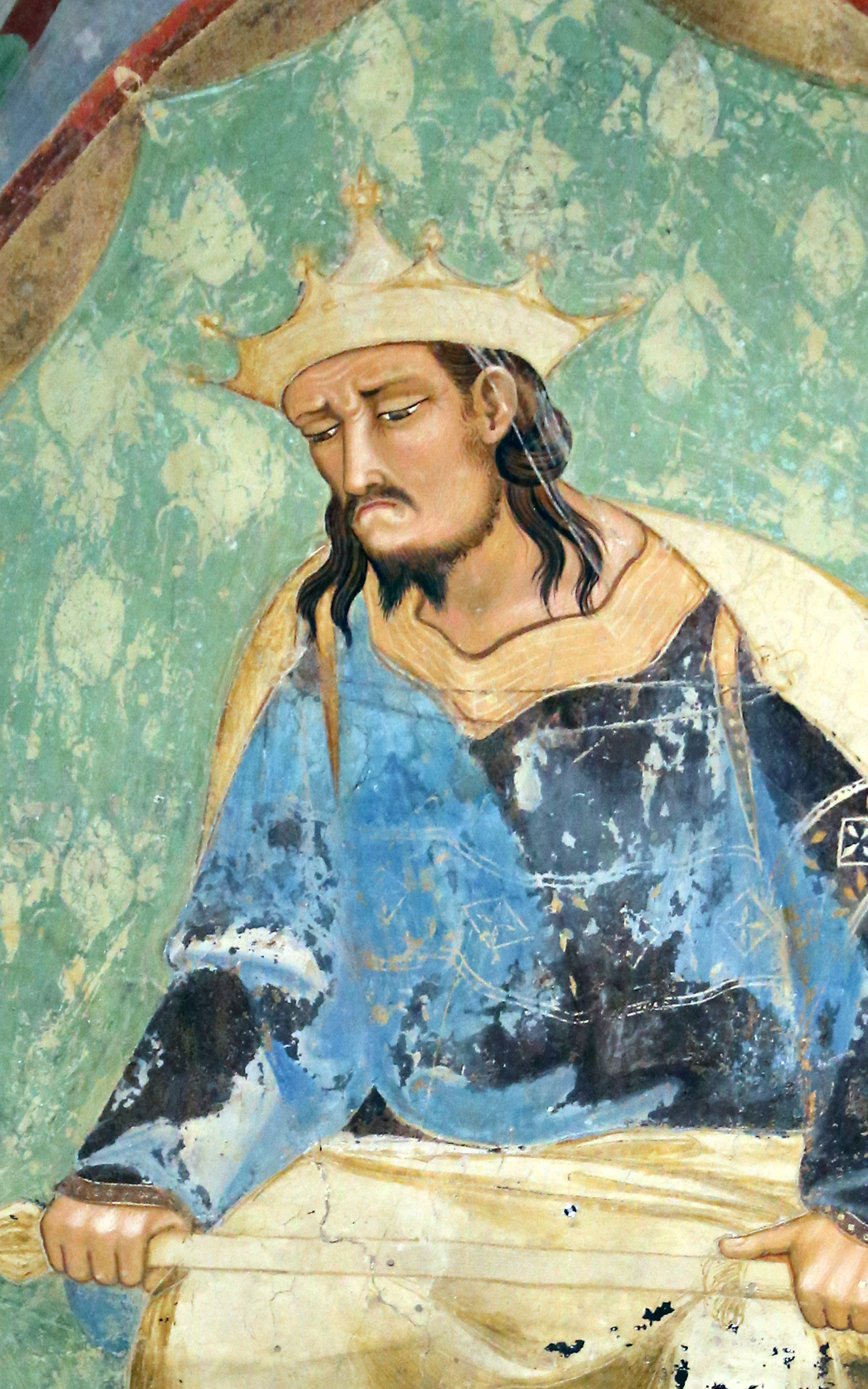
'Ali-Sultan (r.1339-1342), in The Martyrdom of the Franciscans (1342).

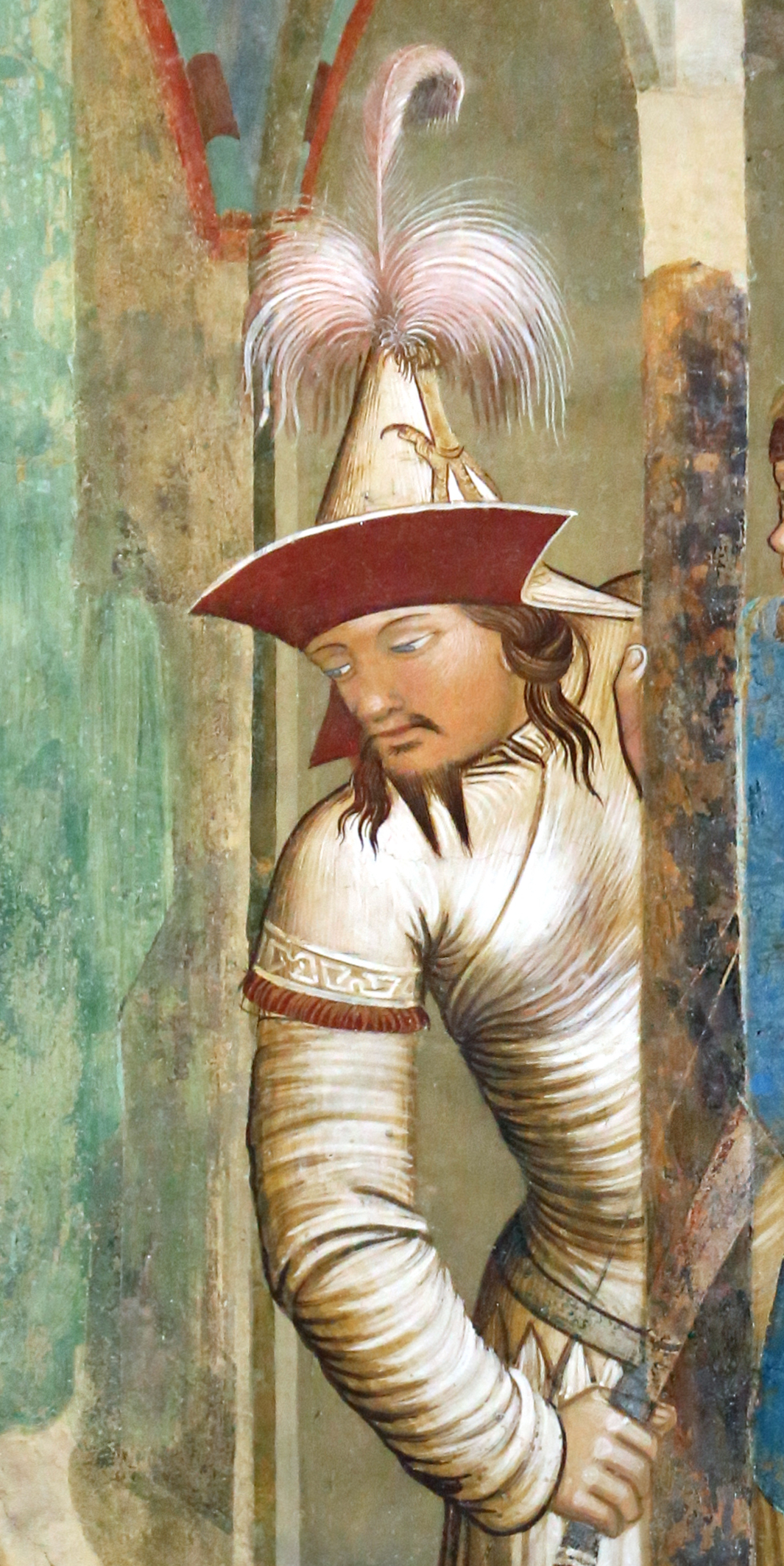
Mongol officer in The Martyrdom of the Franciscans (1342).

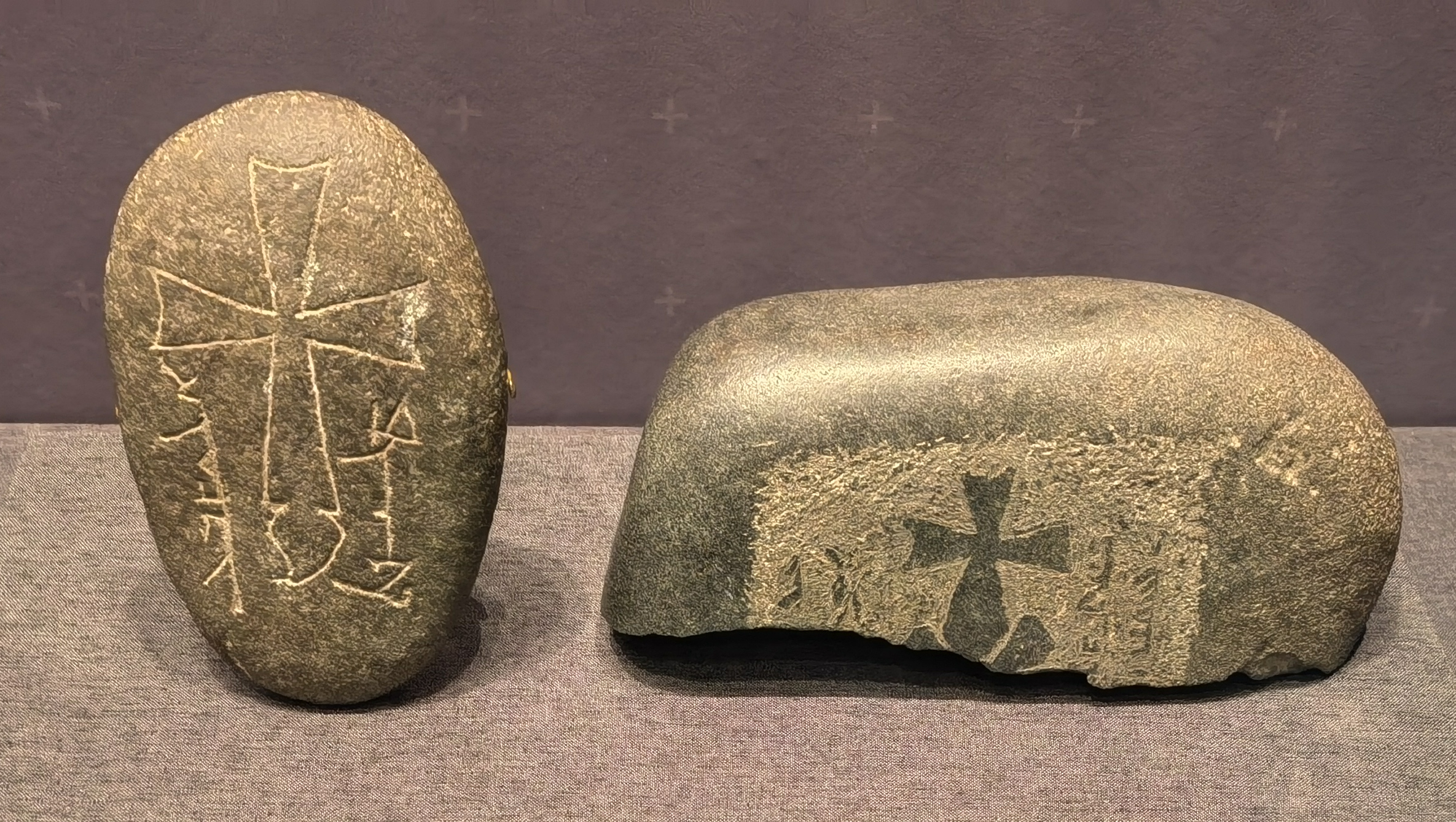
Almaliq Nestorian steles (1206-1368)

=== Fragmentation and expansion (1338–1363) ===
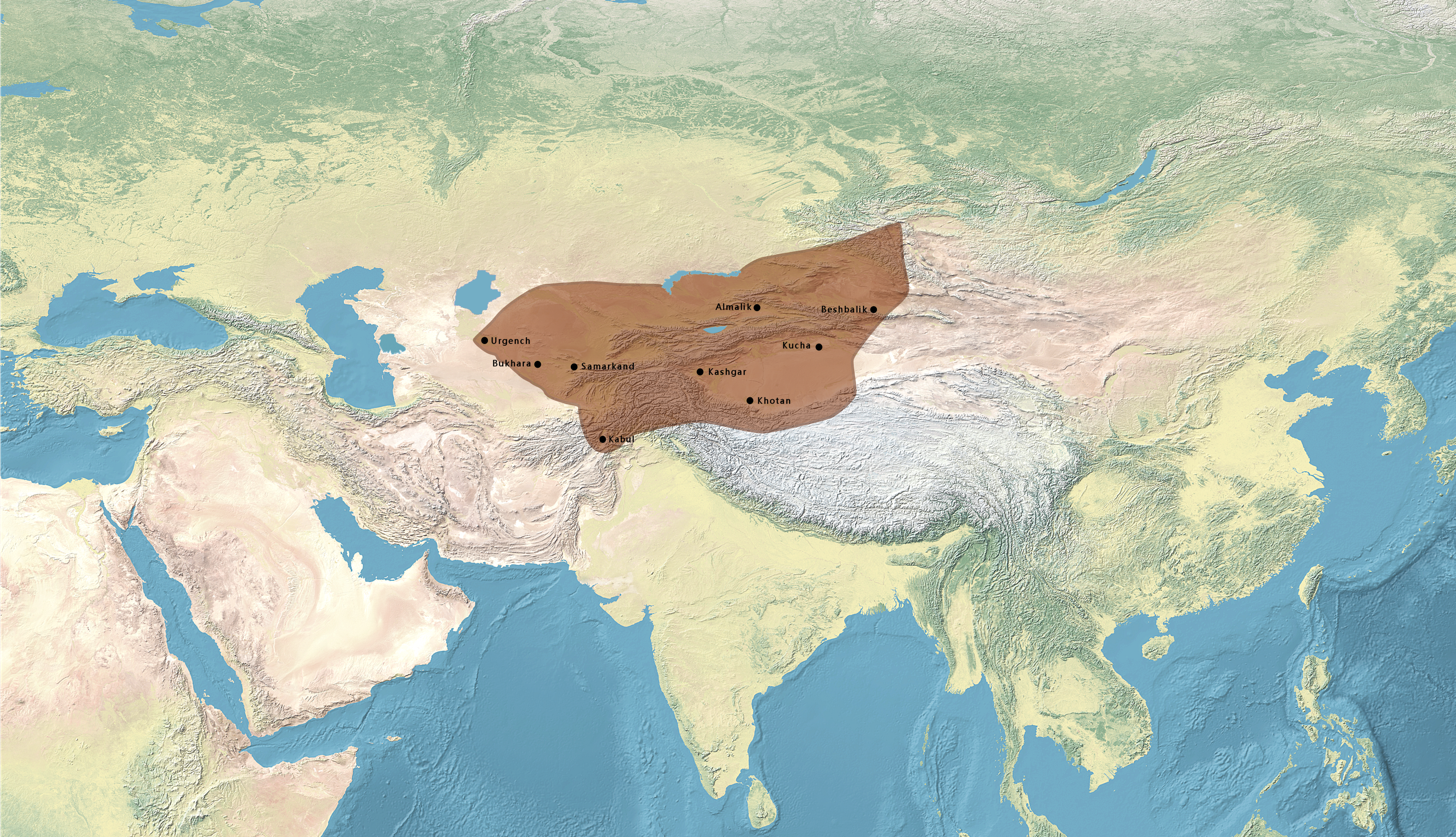
The Chagatai Khanate, with contemporary polities circa 1300, before the expansion of the Timurid Empire into Transoxonia from 1363.

The khanate became increasingly unstable in the following years and split in two during the 1340s. Transoxania was ruled by Qazan Khan ibn Yasaur. In 1346 a tribal chief, Amir Qazaghan, killed Qazan and set up Danishmendji as puppet khan. Danishmendji was killed off a year later and replaced with Bayan Qulï. Qazaghan made Herat a tributary in 1351. He was assassinated in 1357 and was succeeded by his son Abdullah, who killed Bayan Qulï in 1358. This aroused the anger of local lords such as Hajji Beg, the uncle of Tamerlane. Hajji drove out Abdullah to the Hindu Kush, where he died. From then on the Chagatayid khans of Transoxania served as nothing more than figureheads until it was annexed by the Timurid Empire. The Timurids likewise continued to portray descendants of Chaghatai khans as khans (i.e., rulers), but in reality they were confined in their castles with no authority. They were political prisoners in Samarkand.

In the east, the powerful Dughlats enthroned a son of Esen Buqa I, Tughlugh Timur as khan of Moghulistan in 1347. In 1350, Tughlugh converted to Islam. Hajji split Transoxania with Bayan Selduz but they were unable to stabilize the realm, and it fell into disarray. In 1360, Tughlugh invaded Transoxania and conquered it. Hajji Beg fled in the face of overwhelming power. The future conqueror Timur entered Tughlugh's service and was appointed ruler of Shahr-i Sebz. After Tughlugh left Transoxania, Hajji Beg returned in force, only to be driven away again by Tughlugh. Hajji Beg was killed near Sebzewar. Tughlugh expanded his territory into Afghanistan by defeating Amir Husayn. Thus the Chagatai Khanate was restored under Tughlugh.

Following Tughlugh's death in 1363, Timur and Amir Husayn took over Transoxiana. Timur and Amir Husayn forced Tughlugh's successor, Ilyas Khoja out of Transoxania, and then Timur eliminated Amir Husayn as well, gaining mastery over Transoxiana (1369–1405). Like his predecessors, Timur maintained a puppet khan (Soyurgatmish) on the throne to legitimize his rule, but his khans were members of the house of Ögedei rather than descendants of Chagatai.

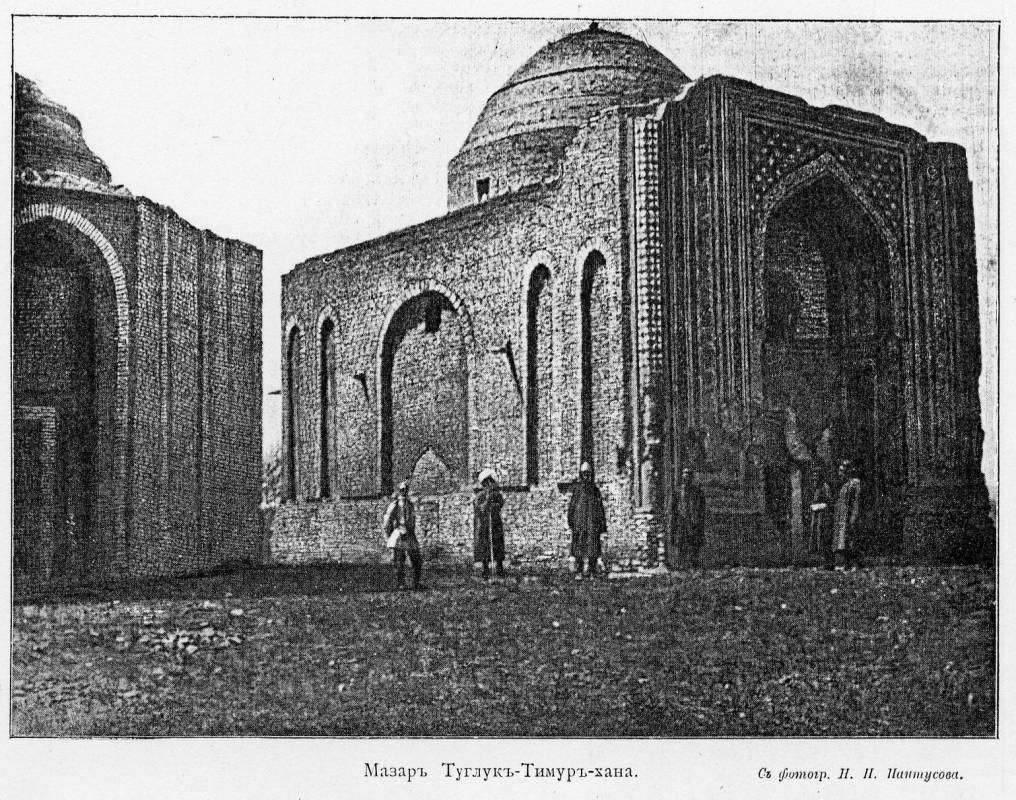
Tughlugh Timur (r.1347–1360) mausoleum, Almaliq, Xinjiang. A rare example of Chagatai architecture.

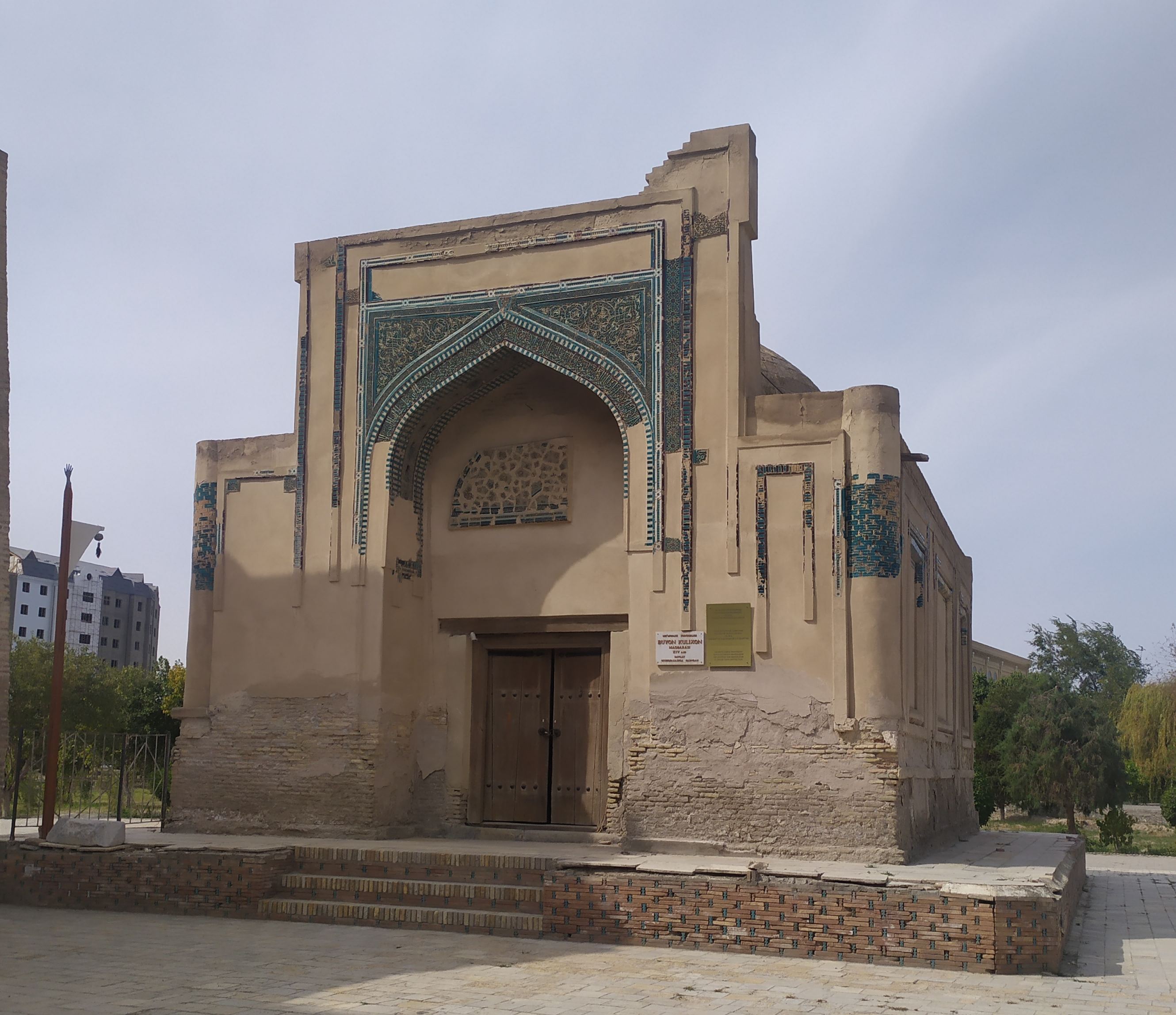
Mausoleum of Bayan Qulï Khan (r.1348-1358), in Bukhara

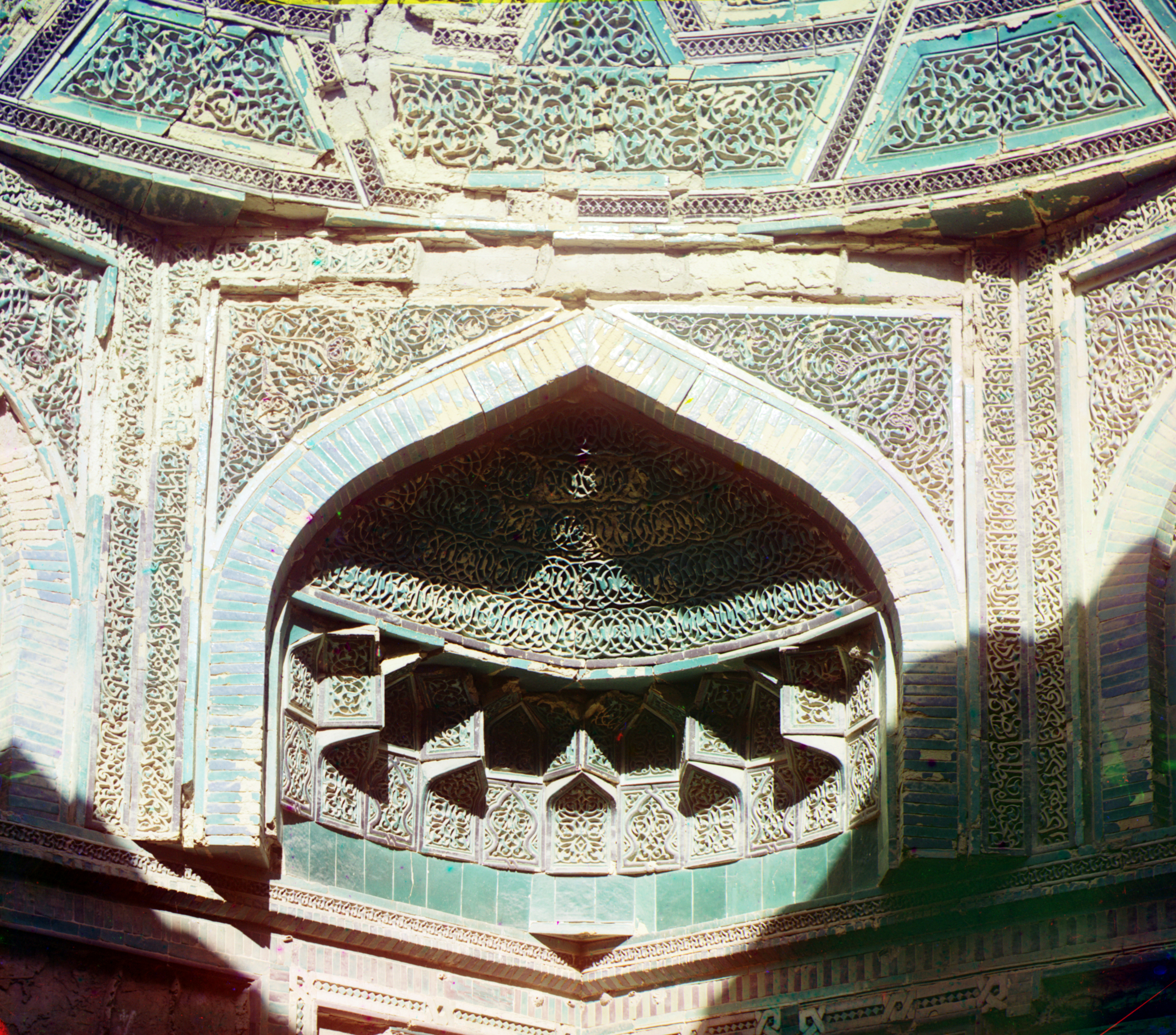
Decorative detail of the mausoleum of Bayan Qulï Khan, 1358

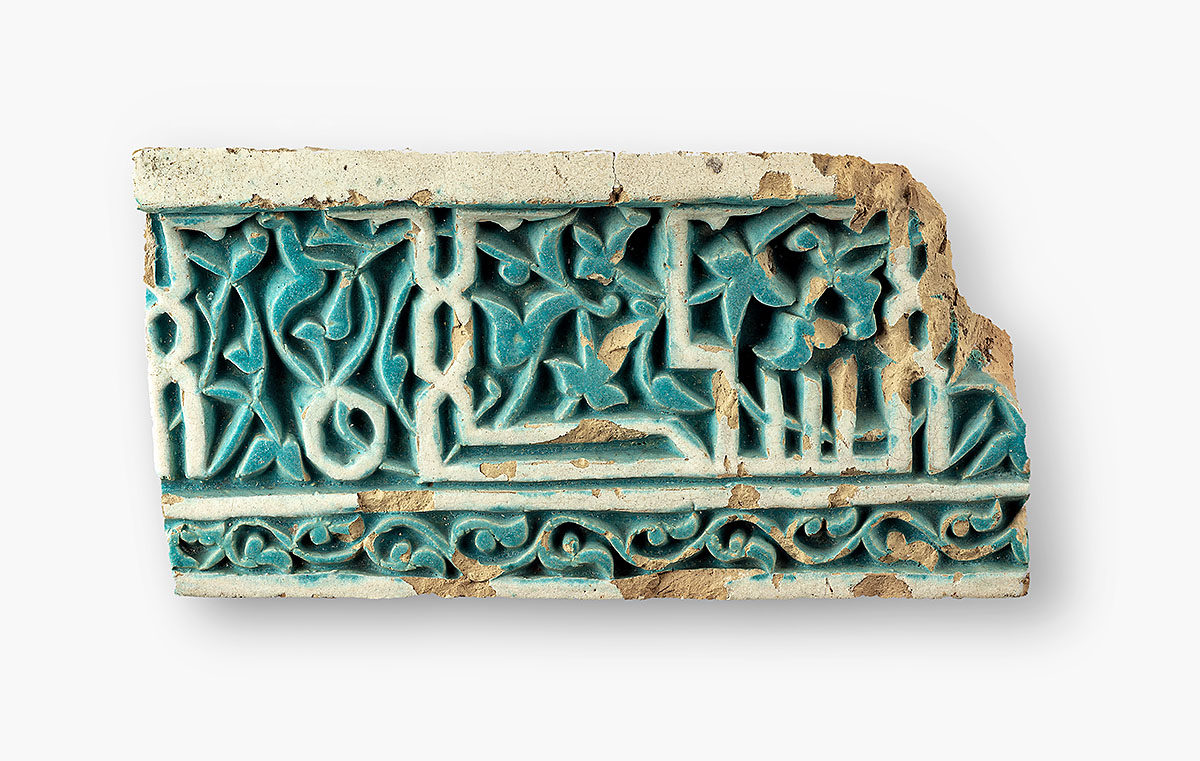
Piece of Buyan Kuli Khan mausoleum frieze

=== Moghulistan (1363–1487) ===
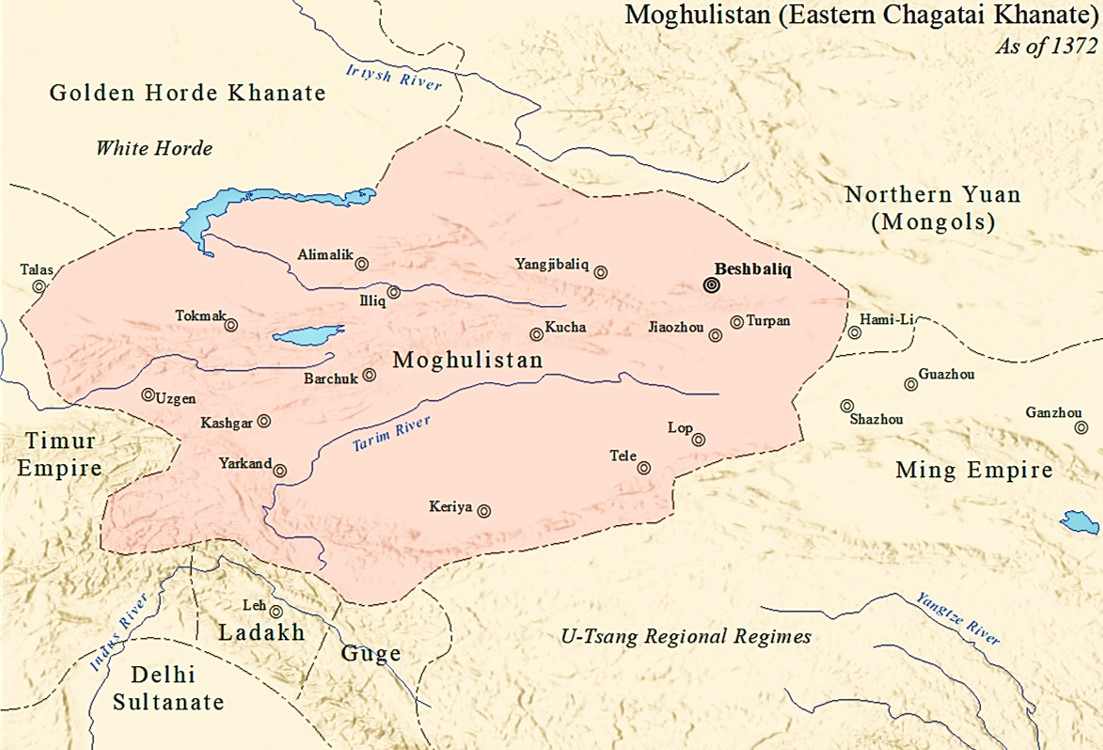
Moghulistan in 1372

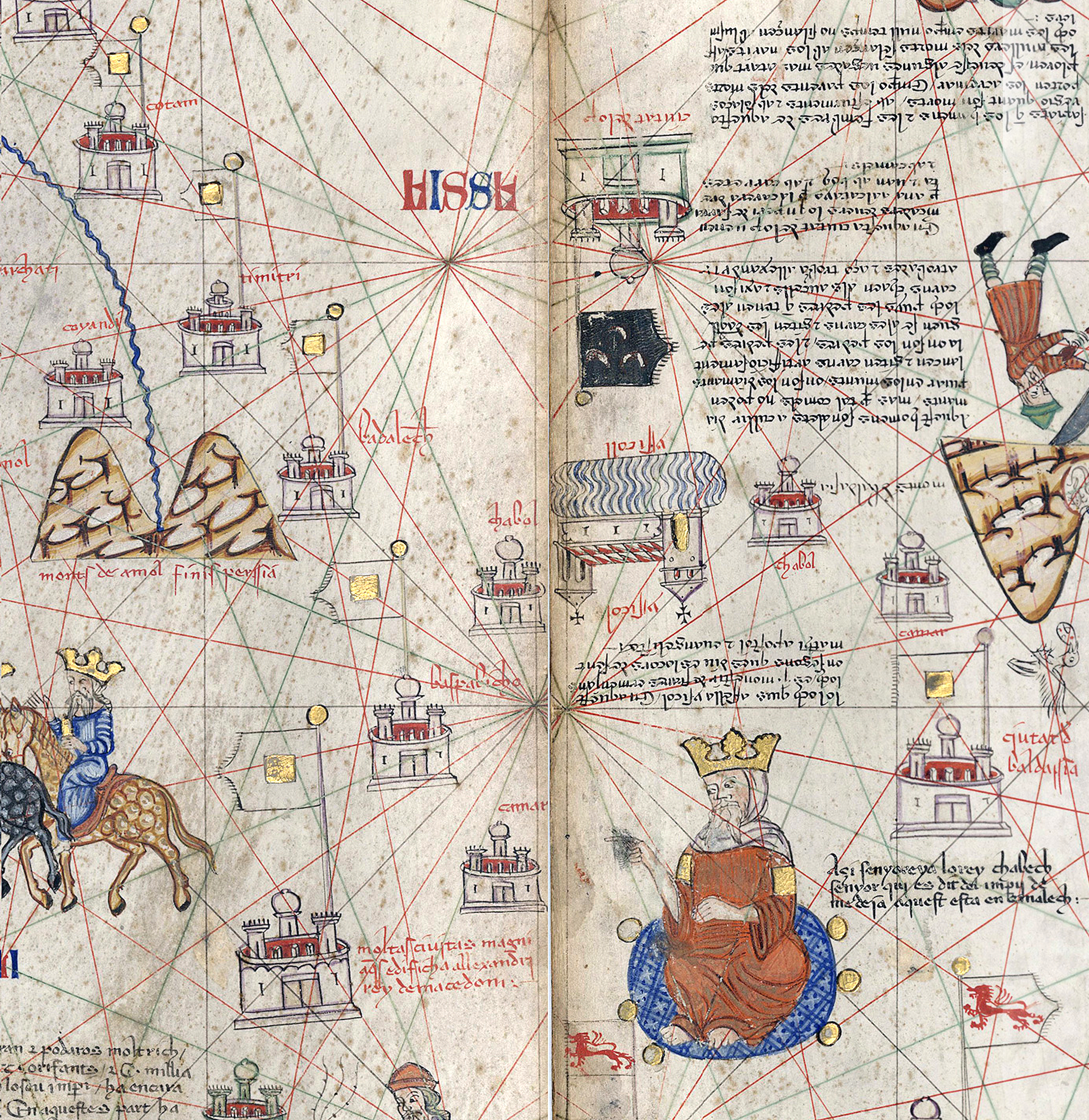
Kingdom of Chagatai in the Catalan Atlas (1375). The Khan Kebek (r. 1309–1325) is depicted with the caption: Here reigns the King Chabech (Kebek), lord of the Medeja [Media] Empire. He resides at Emalech (Almaliq). His cities appear with the Chagatai flag.

Ilyas Khoja attacked Timur in 1364 and defeated him on the north bank of the Syr Darya. He then besieged Samarkand but suffered harsh attrition due to an epidemic so that by the next year he was forced to retreat from Transoxania. The Dughlat Qamar-ud-din Khan Dughlat rebelled and killed Ilyas Khoja in 1368, taking the throne for himself. Ilyas Khoja's brother, Khizr Khoja fled to Turpan where he set up his own independent realm and converted the last Uyghurs there to Islam. In 1375, Timur invaded Moghulistan, looting the Ili region. Qamar retaliated by raiding Fergana until Timur put him in flight. Timur fell into an ambush and barely escaped, retreating to Samarkand. Timur attacked again in 1376 and 1383, but both times failed to capture the Moghul khan. In 1389 Timur attacked Khizr Khoja instead and forced him to flee into the Gobi Desert. In 1390 Timur invaded Moghulistan and once again failed to find Qamar, but Qamar, having fled, was never heard of again. Khizr Khoja returned to Moghulistan and assumed power once more. He gave his daughter in marriage to Timur and made peace with him in 1397. Khizr Khoja died in 1399 and was succeeded by his three sons in succession: Shams-i-Jahan (1399–1408), Muhammad Khan (1408–1415), and Naqsh-i-Jahan (1415–1418). Upon Khizr Khoja's death, Timur took the opportunity to send another army to pillage Moghul lands.

Uwais Khan came to power in 1418. During his reign he waged war on the Oirats and was taken prisoner by their leader, Esen Taishi. Due to Uwais' royal lineage, Esen Taishi treated him with respect and released him. Uwais suffered two more defeats against the Oirats and was captured a second time. He was let go after sending his sister as hostage to Esen Taishi's family. Uwais died in 1429. Two factions supporting his two sons, Yunus Khan and Esen Buqa II quarreled over the throne, with Esen Buqa II emerging as the victor. Yunus fled to Samarkand. Under Esen Buqa II, the powerful Dughlat Sayyid Ali, who had helped him to the throne, became very influential and held both Kucha and Kashgar. In 1451, Esen Buqa II raided the northern border of the Timurid Empire.

The Timurid ruler Abu Sa'id Mirza schemed to split the Moghuls in two, so he summoned Yunus in 1456 and supported his authority in the Ili region. Yunus tried to conquer Kashgar but was repelled by Sayyid Ali and Esen Buqa II. Esen Buqa II died in 1462. His son, Dost Muhammad was an inexperienced 17-year-old. He plundered the territory of the Dughlats. By the time he died in 1469, his realm was in general revolt. Yunus took advantage of the situation to capture the Moghul capital Aksu. Dost Muhammad's young son, Kebek Sultan was taken to Turpan, where he was proclaimed khan. Four years later, he was put to death by his followers and brought to Yunus. Yunus thus became the sole ruler of Moghulistan in 1472.

Yunus' reign began with a raid by the Oirats under Esen Taishi's son Amasanj, who forced Yunus to flee to the Syr Darya. Yunus returned after the Oirats left with their pillage. In 1465, Yunus faced a rebellion by Mirza Abu Bakr Dughlat, who seized Yarkand and Khotan. Yunus attempted twice to remove to Abu Bakr but was defeated both times in 1479 and 1480, after which Abu Bakr also seized Kashgar. In the east, Yunus captured Hami from Kara Del, which was then a tributary of the Ming dynasty. A Ming army evicted the Moghuls from the city but failed to catch them, and they soon returned to Hami afterwards. Yunus also took advantage of political infighting in the west to vassalize Umar Shaikh Mirza II's realm in Fergana. Yunus moved to Tashkent in 1484 and settled down, giving up the nomadic way of life. His nomadic followers became alarmed by this action and departed for the steppes, taking with them Yunus' second son, Ahmad Alaq. When Yunus died in 1486, his realm was divided between Western Moghulistan, ruled by Mahmud Khan, and Eastern Moghulistan, ruled by Ahmad Alaq in the northeast.

=== Western and Eastern Moghulistan (1487–1508) ===
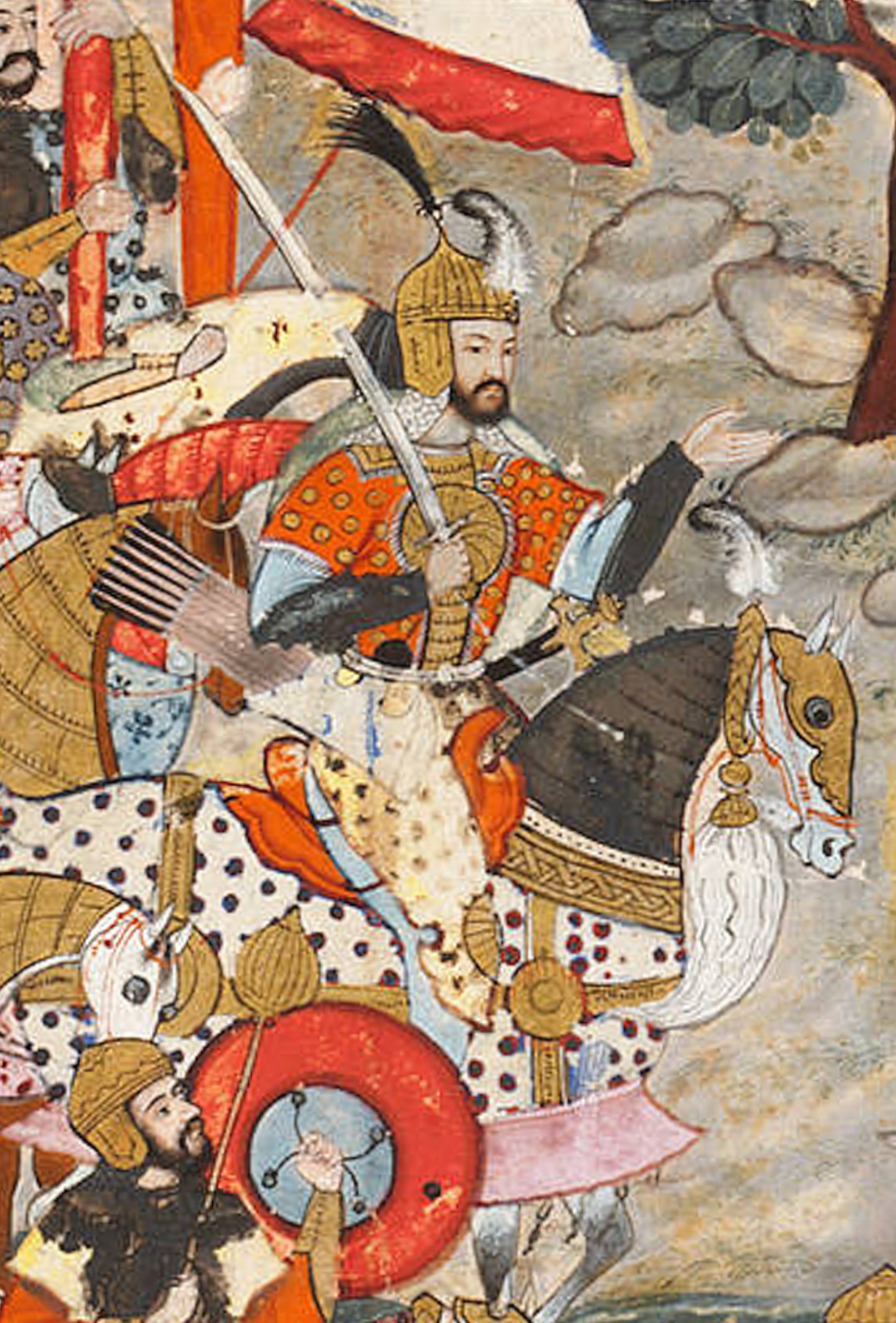
Mahmud Khan (r.1487–1508) ruled from Tashkent over Western Moghulistan. Baburnama (1589)

Following the death of their father, Yunus Khan, Mahmud Khan ruled over the western part of Moghulistan from Tashkent, while his brother Ahmad Alaq ruled over the eastern part. In 1488, the Timurids of Samarkand tried to recover Tashkent but were defeated by Mahmud. In 1487, Mahmud gave refuge to Muhammad Shaybani, who then seized Bukhara and Samarkand from the Timurids in 1500, making himself ruler of Transoxania. Shaybani immediately turned against Mahmud, who called his brother Ahmad Alaq for help, and defeated both Moghul khans and took them prisoner. Shaybani released them soon after, but kept Tashkent and Sairam. Ahmad died soon after. Mahmud was captured again in 1508 and put to death by Shaybani, marking the last time the Chagatayids were ejected from Transoxania.

=== Yarkent and Turpan Khanates (1514–1705) ===
==== Yarkent Khanate (1514–1705) ====
In 1514, Mansur Khan's brother Sultan Said Khan captured Kashgar, Yarkand, and Khotan from Mirza Abu Bakr Dughlat, who had ruled in Mahmud's absence, and forced him to flee to Ladakh. This marked the final separation of Moghulistan into two realms, with Said situated in Kashgar where he founded the Yarkent Khanate, and Mansur remained Turpan in the Turpan Khanate. In 1529, Said attacked Badakhshan, and in 1531, he invaded Ladakh. During the campaign, Said fell ill from altitude sickness and died in July 1533 on the homeward journey. He was succeeded by his son Abdurashid Khan. Abdurashid came into conflict with the Dughlats and persecuted one of their leaders, Sayyid Muhammad-mirza. Abdurashid spent his reign fighting the Kyrgyz people and the Kazakhs, who made incursions on the Ili region and Issyk Kul. He was ultimately unsuccessful in preventing the Kyrgyz-Kazakhs from seizing the Ili region. Abdurashid was succeeded in 1565 by his son Abdul Karim Khan, who shifted the capital to Yarkand. Abdul was succeeded in 1590 by his brother Muhammad Sultan, who repelled an invasion by the Khanate of Bukhara under Abdullah Khan II. Muhammad died in 1610 and was succeeded by his son Shudja ad Din Ahmad Khan, who was assassinated in 1619, and replaced by Abd al-Latif (Afak) Khan. Abd al-Latif (Afak) Khan was succeeded by his nephew Sultan Ahmad Khan (Pulat Khan) in 1631. Pulat was overthrown by Abdallah (Moghul Khan) in 1636. Abdallah stabilized the court and exiled a number of old nobles to India. He repelled Oirat inroads in the Khotan and Aksu regions, and entered a tributary relationship with the Qing dynasty in 1655. Friendly relations were also established with Bukhara and the Mughal Empire. In 1667, Abdallah's son Yulbars Khan removed his father from power.

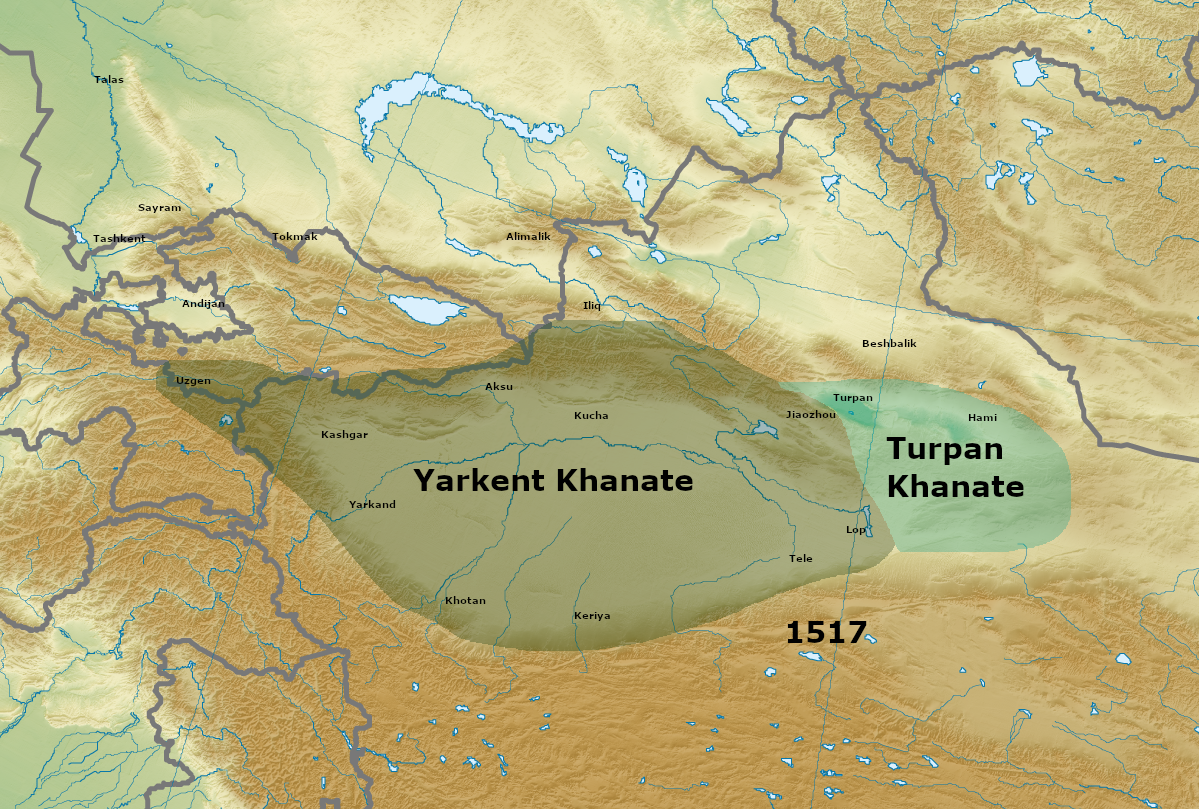
Yarkent and Turpan in 1517

From the late 16th century onward, the Yarkent Khanate fell under the influence of the Khojas. The Khojas were Muslims who claimed descent from Muhammad or from the first four Arab caliphs. By the reign of Said in the early 16th century, the Khojas already had a strong influence in court and over the khan. In 1533, an especially influential Khoja named Makhdum-i Azam arrived in Kashgar, where he settled and had two sons. These two sons hated each other and they passed down their mutual hatred down to their children. The two lineages came to dominate large parts of the khanate, splitting it between two factions: the Aq Taghliq (White Mountain) in Kashgar and the Qara Taghliq (Black Mountain) in Yarkand. Yulbars patronized the Aq Taghliqs and suppressed the Qara Taghliqs, which caused much resentment, and resulted in his assassination in 1670. He was succeeded by his son who ruled for only a brief period before Ismail Khan was enthroned. Ismail reversed the power struggle between the two Muslim factions and drove out the Aq Taghliq leader, Afaq Khoja. Afaq fled to Tibet, where the 5th Dalai Lama aided him in enlisting the help of Galdan Boshugtu Khan, ruler of the Dzungar Khanate.

In 1680, Galdan led 120,000 Dzungars into the Yarkent Khanate. They were aided by the Aq Taghliqs and Hami and Turpan, which had already submitted to the Dzungars. Ismail's son Babak Sultan died in the resistance against them in the battle for Kashgar. The general Iwaz Beg died in the defense of Yarkand. The Dzungars defeated the Moghul forces without much difficulty and took Ismail and his family prisoner. Galdan installed Abd ar-Rashid Khan II, son of Babak, as puppet khan. The new khan forced Afaq Khoja to flee again, but Abd ar-Rashid's reign was also ended unceremoniously two years later when riots erupted in Yarkand. He was replaced by his brother Muhammad Imin Khan. Muhammad sought help from the Qing dynasty, Khanate of Bukhara, and the Mughal Empire in combating the Dzungars. In 1693, Muhammad conducted a successful attack on the Dzungar Khanate, taking 30,000 captives. Unfortunately Afaq Khoja appeared again and overthrew Muhammad in a revolt led by his followers. Afaq's son Yahiya Khoja was enthroned but his reign was cut short in 1695 when both he and his father were killed while suppressing local rebellions. In 1696, Akbash Khan was placed on the throne, but the begs of Kashgar refused to recognize him, and instead allied with the Kyrgyz to attack Yarkand, taking Akbash prisoner. The begs of Yarkand went to the Dzungars, who sent troops and ousted the Kyrgyz in 1705. The Dzungars installed a non-Chagatayid ruler Mirza Alim Shah Beg, thereby ending the rule of Chagatai khans forever.

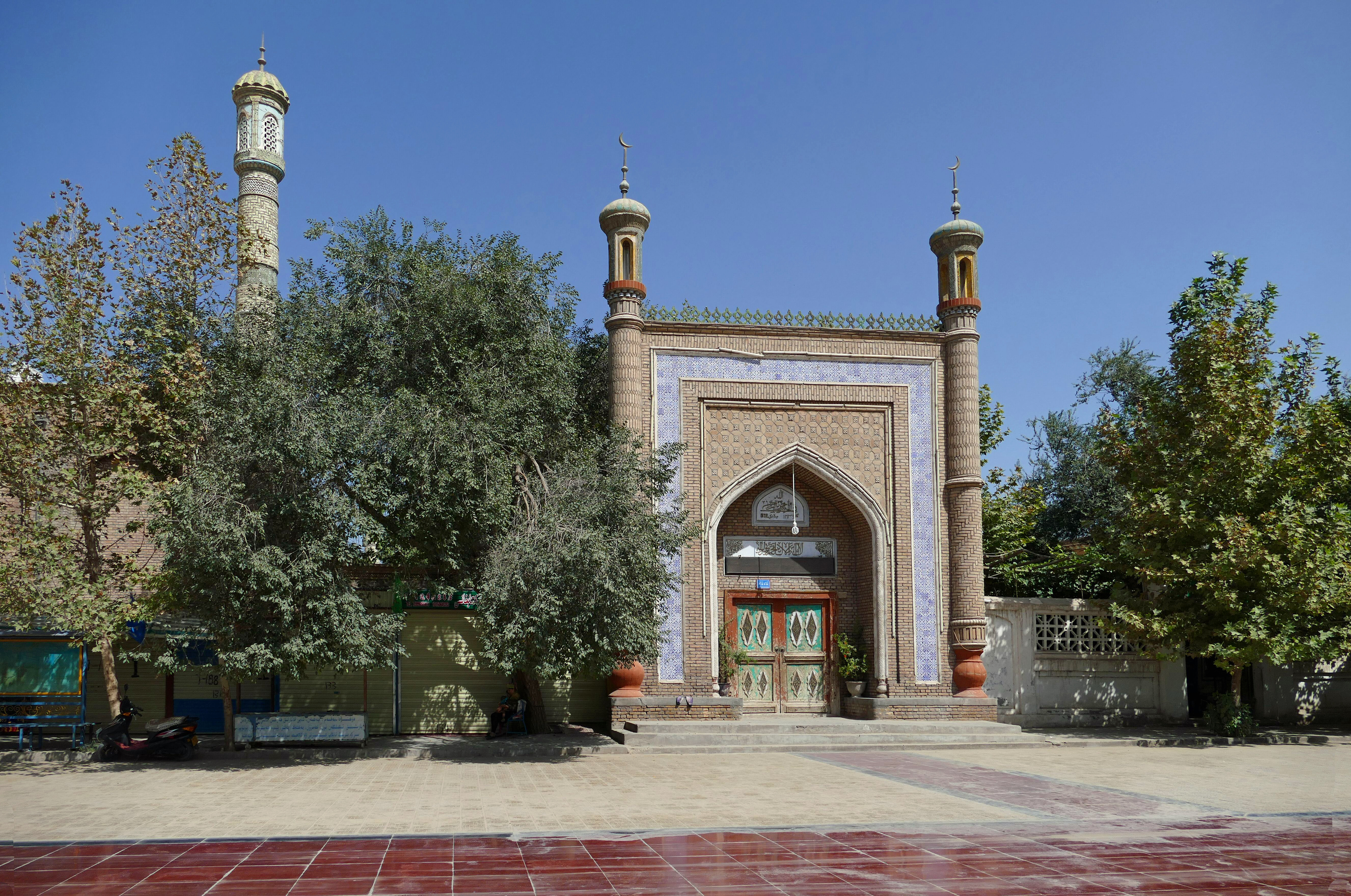
Altyn Mosque in Yarkand

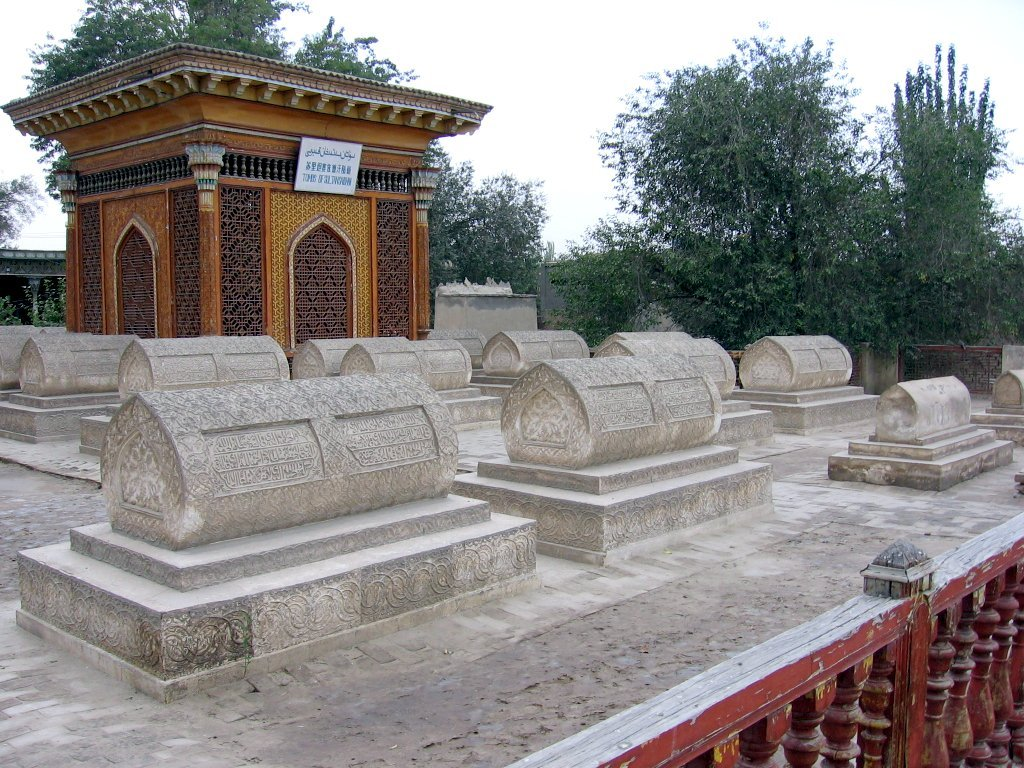
Royal tombs of the Yarkent Khanate at the Altyn Mosque in Yarkand, with tomb of Sultan Said Khan (1533) in the central pavilion

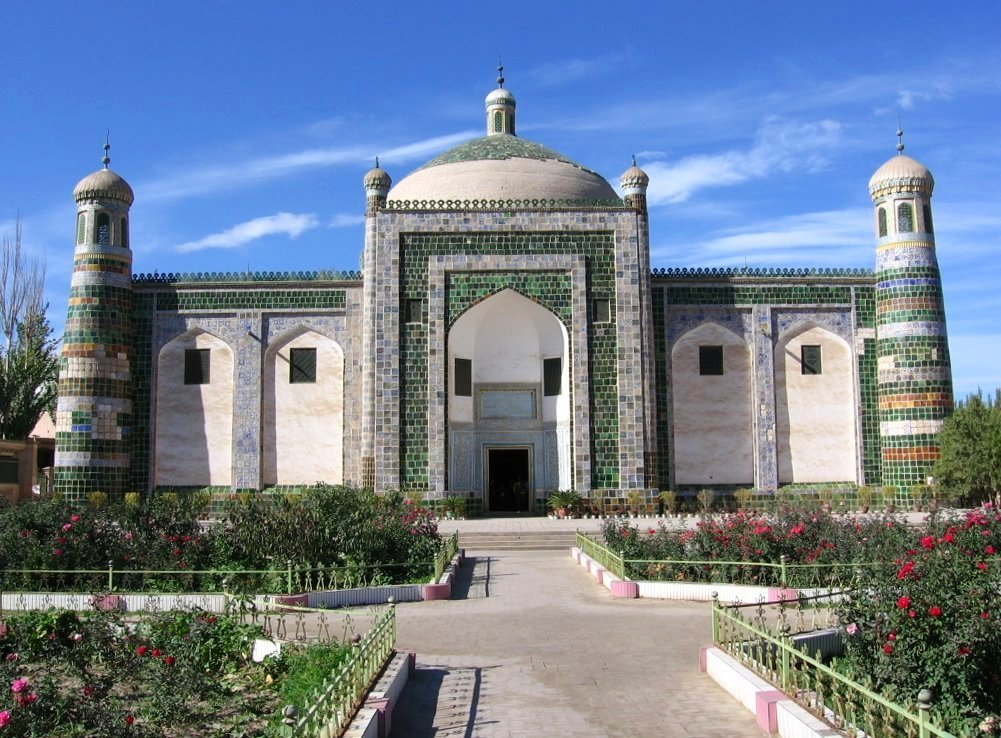
Afaq Khoja Mausoleum, 1640 tomb of Afaq Khoja near Kashgar

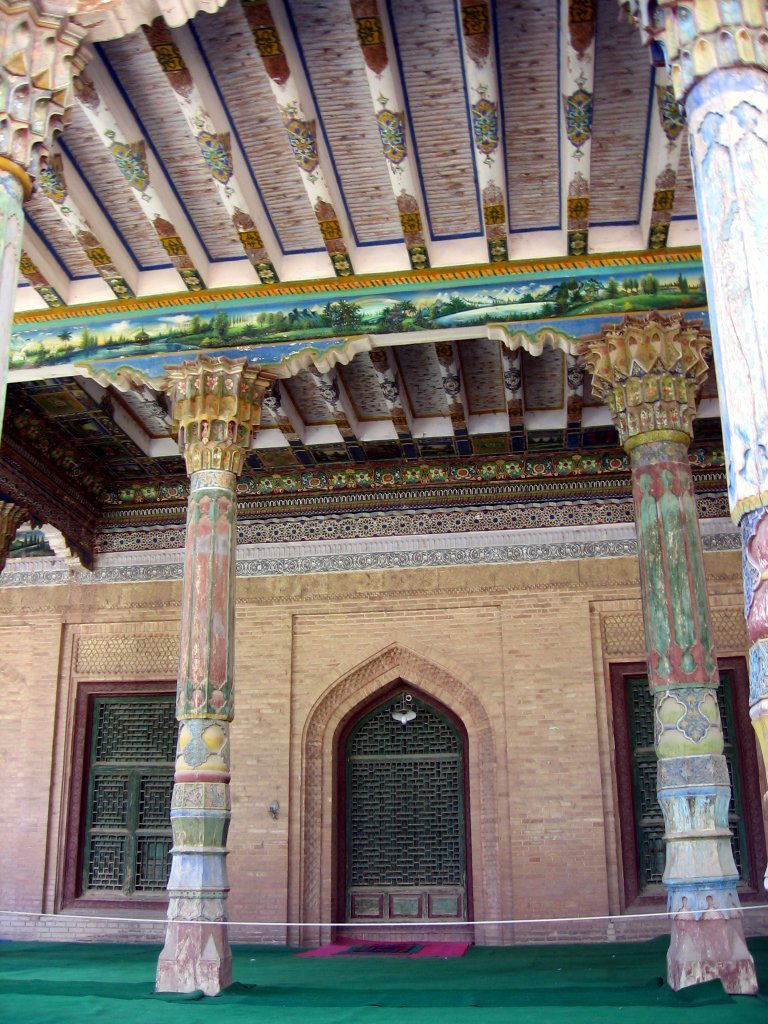
The entrance of Afaq Khoja Mausoleum

==== Turpan Khanate (1487–1570) ====
Ahmad Alaq's reduced nomadic realm (known as the Turpan Khanate) came into frequent conflict with the Oirats, Kyrgyz people, and Kazakhs. According to the Tarikh-i Rashidi, the Oirats called him Alasha, "the Killer". In 1482, Hami was restored to Kara Del under Qanšin, but in 1488, Ahmad killed Qanšin and retook the city. The next year Ahmad was driven out of Hami. In 1493, Ahmad captured Kara Del's ruler Šamba and held him prisoner. Šamba received support from the Ming dynasty, which closed its borders to Turpan and expelled its traders from their markets, which eventually forced Ahmad to give up his ambitions in Hami due to unrest in his realm. In 1499 Ahmad retook Kashgar and Yengisar from Mirza Abu Bakr Dughlat.

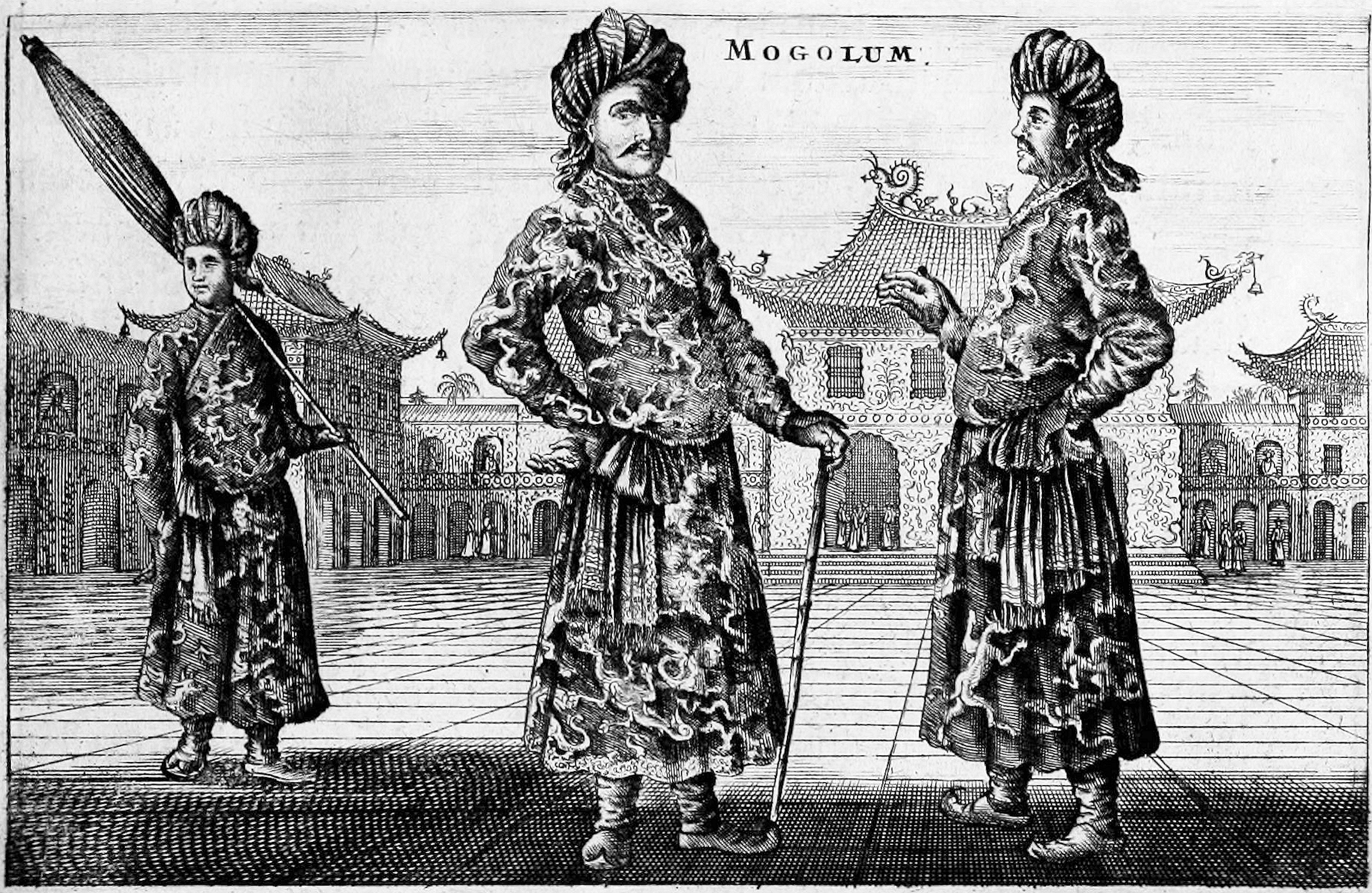
A "Moghol Embassy", as seen by the VOC embassy to Beijing in October 1656. The emissaries portrayed had probably come from Turpan, rather than all the way from the Moghul India. They wore dresses of blue silk, decorated with dragons.

Around 1500, Muhammad Shaybani attacked Ahmad's brother Mahmud Khan, who appealed to Ahmad for help. Muhammad defeated both Ahmad and Mahmud, seizing Tashkent and Sairam. Ahmad was captured but released soon after. He died of paralysis in Aksu a year later. His brother Mansur Khan succeeded him. His reign began with difficulties with the powerful Dughlat of Kashgar, Mirza Abu Bakr Dughlat, plundering the cities of Kucha and Aksu. In 1514, Mansur's brother Sultan Said Khan captured Kashgar, Yarkand, and Khotan from Abu Bakr and forced him to flee to Ladakh. This marked the final separation of Moghulistan into two realms, with Said situated in Kashgar, and Mansur in Turpan, otherwise known as Uyghuristan.

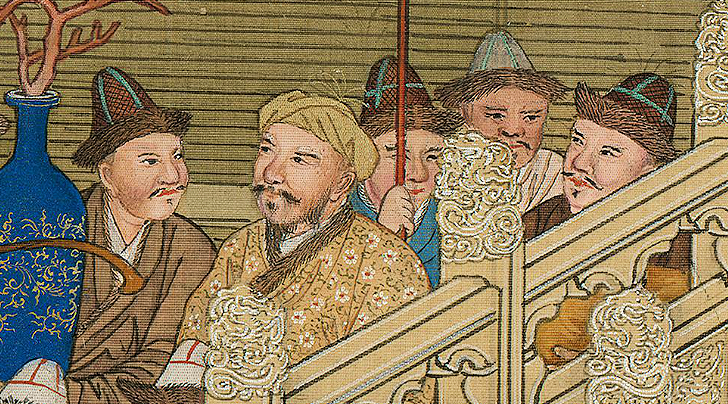
Yarkent dignitaries (葉爾奇木) in Beijing in 1761. 万国来朝图

In 1513, Kara Del submitted to Mansur and in 1517 Mansur moved to Hami permanently, where he launched raids against the Ming dynasty. Mansur was succeeded in 1545 by his son Shah Khan. Shah fought with his brother Muhammad, who seized part of Hami and allied with the Oirats. Shah died in 1560 and Muhammad succeeded him. Muhammad had to fight against a third brother, Sufi Sultan, who tried to enlist the Ming in support of his claim to the throne. After Muhammad's death in 1570, the Turpan Khanate faded from historical texts. The last thing heard of them are embassies sent from Turpan to Beijing in 1647 and 1657. The Qing dynasty regarded them as embassies from a genuine Chagatayid.

== Government ==
The Chagatai Mongols remained mostly nomadic in their mode of government and did not settle down in urban centers until the late 15th century. The Mongols of the Chagatai Khanate treated the urban dwellers of Transoxiana and the Tarim Basin as dependencies.

== Family tree ==
Chagatai Khanate family tree

Genghis Khan; Great Khan of the Mongol Empire; 1206–1227
Jochi	Chagatai Khan; Khan of the Chagatai Khanate; 1226–1242	Tului	Ogedei Khan; Great Khan of the Mongol Empire; 1229–1241
Yesü Möngke; Khan of the Chagatai Khanate; 1246–1252	Baidar	Sarban	Khashi
Mutukan	Alghu; Khan of the Chagatai Khanate; 1260–1266	Negübei; Khan of the Chagatai Khanate; 1270–1272	Khaidu
Büri	Qara Hülegü; Khan of the Chagatai Khanate; First Reign; 1242–1246; Second Reign; 1252	Yesünto'a	Danishmendji; Khan of the Chagatai Khanate; 1346–1348	Ali Sultan; Khan of the Chagatai Khanate; 1342
Qadaqchi	Mubarak Shah; Khan of the Chagatai Khanate; First Reign; 1252–1260; Second Reign; 1266	Baraq Khan; Khan of the Chagatai Khanate; 1266–1270	Soyurgatmish; Khan of the Western Chagatai Khanate; 1370–1384
Buqa Temür; Khan of the Chagatai Khanate; 1272–1282	Taliqu; Khan of the Chagatai Khanate; 1308–1309	Du'a; Khan of the Chagatai Khanate; 1282–1307	Sultan Mahmud; Khan of the Western Chagatai Khanate; 1384–1402
Orüg Temür	Konchek; Khan of the Chagatai Khanate; 1307–1308	Kebek; Khan of the Chagatai Khanate; First Reign; 1309–1310; Second Reign; 1318–1325	Eljigidey; Khan of the Chagatai Khanate; 1325–1329	Esen Buqa I Khan of the Chagatai Khanate; 1310–1318	Du'a Temür; Khan of the Chagatai Khanate; 1329–1330	Tarmashirin; Khan of the Chagatai Khanate; 1330–1334	Ebugen	Surguda
Yasa'ur	Pulad	Khabul Shah; Khan of the Western Chagatai Khanate; 1364–1370	Tughlugh Timur; Khan of Moghulistan; 1347–1363; Khan of the Chagatai Khanate; 1360–1363	Buzan; Khan of the Chagatai Khanate; 1334–1335	Changshi; Khan of the Chagatai Khanate; 1335–1338	Yesun Temür; Khan of the Chagatai Khanate; 1338–1342	Bayan Quli; Khan of the Western Chagatai Khanate; 1348–1358
Qazan Khan; Khan of the Chagatai Khanate; 1343–1346	Muhammad I Khan of the Chagatai Khanate; 1342–1343	Ilyas Khoja; Khan of Moghulistan; 1363–1368	Khizr Khoja; Khan of Moghulistan; 1389–1399	Shah Temur; Khan of the Western Chagatai Khanate; 1358
Adil Sultan; Khan of the Western Chagatai Khanate; 1363	Shams-i-Jahan; Khan of Moghulistan; 1399–1408	Muhammad II; Khan of Moghulistan; 1408–1415
Naqsh-i-Jahan; Khan of Moghulistan; 1415–1418	Sher Ali Oghlan	Sher Muhammad; Khan of Moghulistan; 1421–1425
Vais Khan; Khan of Moghulistan; First Reign; 1418–1421; Second Reign; 1425–1429
Yunus Khan; Khan of Eastern Moghulistan; 1462–1487; Khan of Moghulistan; 1469–1487	Esen Buqa II; Khan of Moghulistan; 1429–1462
Ahmad Alaq; Khan of Uyghuristan; 1487–1503	Mahmud Khan; Khan of the Western Moghulistan; 1487–1508	Dost Muhammad; Khan of Uyghuristan; 1462–1468
Sultan Said Khan; Khan of the Western Moghulistan; 1514–1533	Mansur Khan; Khan of Uyghuristan; 1503–1543; Khan of Moghulistan; 1508–1514	Kebek Sultan Oghlan; Khan of Uyghuristan; 1469
Khans of Yarkent	Shah Khan; Khan of Uyghuristan; 1543–1560	Muhammad Khan; Khan of Uyghuristan ?–1570

Bibliography:
- Bretschneider, Emil (1888). Medieval Researches from Eastern Asiatic Sources. Vol. II. London: Trübner & Company. pp. 226–36.
- de Zambaur, Eduard Karl Max (1927). Manuel de genealogie et de chronologie pour l'histoire de l'Islam (in French). Hanover: Librairie Orientaliste Heinz Lafaire. p. 249.
- Zhao, George Qingzhi (2008). Marriage as Political Strategy and Cultural Expression: Mongolian Royal Marriages from World Empire to Yuan Dynasty. Peter Lang Publishing. pp. 273–74. ISBN 978-1-4331-0275-2.

== See also ==
- List of Chagatai khans
- List of Mongol states
- Division of the Mongol Empire
