= Duwa Temür =

Khan of the Chagatai Khanate from 1329 to 1330

Khan of the Chagatai Khanate
- Reign: 1329–1330
- Predecessor: Eljigidey
- Successor: Tarmashirin
- Died: 1330

Duwa Temür (Дуватөмөр) or Tore Temur (Төртөмөр) was Khan of the Chagatai Khanate for a period in 1329/1330. He was the son of Duwa.

He surrendered to the forces of the Yuan dynasty in 1313 when Esen Buqa I revolted against Yuan emperor Ayurbarwada whom he had paid tributes before. Duwa Temür became khan by overthrowing his brother Eljigidey. Some Muslim sources claim that he himself was forcibly removed by another brother, Tarmashirin, who then took control of the Chagatai Khanate after only a short period of time. But it is known that he was still the ruler of the Chagatayids in 1330 from the Yuanshi and some European sources. Because Tarmashirin wrote in his letter that he was enthroned as Chagatai Khan in 1330 to the Yuan dynasty and the map published in China around 1330 also shows the Chagatai Khanate as the Ulus of Duwa Temur.

During his reign, Yuan emperor Tugh Temur (1328 - 1329 and 1329 - 1332) took a third of revenues from Khiva and Khot in the Chagatai Khanate.

Preceded by Eljigidey	Khan of Chagatai Khanate; 1329–1330	Succeeded by Tarmashirin
