= Yesun Temur (Chagatai Khanate) =

Khan of the Chagatai Khanate
- Reign: 1337–1339
- Predecessor: Changshi
- Successor: 'Ali-Sultan
- Father: Ebugen
- Religion: Tengrism

Yesun Temur (Есөнтөмөр; Chinese: 也孙帖木儿) was a Tengric khan (r. 1337–1339) of Chagatai Khanate. He was the younger brother of Changshi Khan. Their father was prince Ebugen who was the son of Duwa, the Chagatai Khan. Yesun Temur's name literally means "Nine Iron" in the Mongolian language.

Yesun Temur ascended to power after the death of Changshi, whose rule ended around 1337 under unclear circumstances. Some later accounts suggest he may have been involved in his brother’s removal, possibly through intrigue or violence, but no definitive evidence supports this claim. His brief reign saw continued tension within the khanate, particularly between traditional Mongol factions and the growing influence of Islam. He was overthrown by 'Ali-Sultan of the House of Ogedei in 1339.

== See also ==
- Yesün Temür (Yuan dynasty)

Preceded by Changshi	Khan of Chagatai Khanate; 1337–1339	Succeeded by 'Ali-Sultan
