= Shudja ad Din Ahmad Khan =

Khan of the Yarkent Khanate from 1609 to 1618

Khan of Yarkent
- Reign: 1609 – 1618
- Predecessor: Muhammad Sultan
- Successor: Kuraish Sultan
- Born: 1570
- Died: 1618 (aged 47–48)

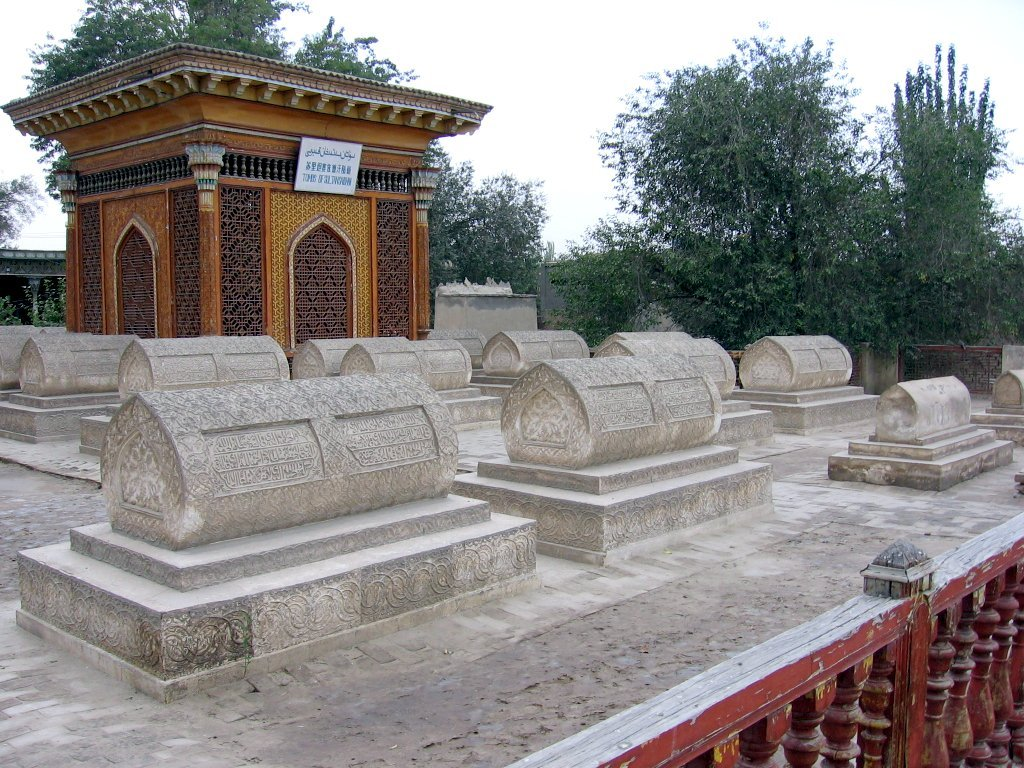
Royal Cemetery Altun of Great Moghul Khans in Yarkand with tombs of Sultan Said Khan (1514–1533), Abdurashid Khan (1533–1560), Abdul Karim Khan (1560–1591), Muhammad Khan (1591–1609), Shudja ad-Din Ahmad Khan (1609–1618), Abdal Latif Sultan (Afak Khan) (1618–1630) and other members of this Dynasty (1347–1930)

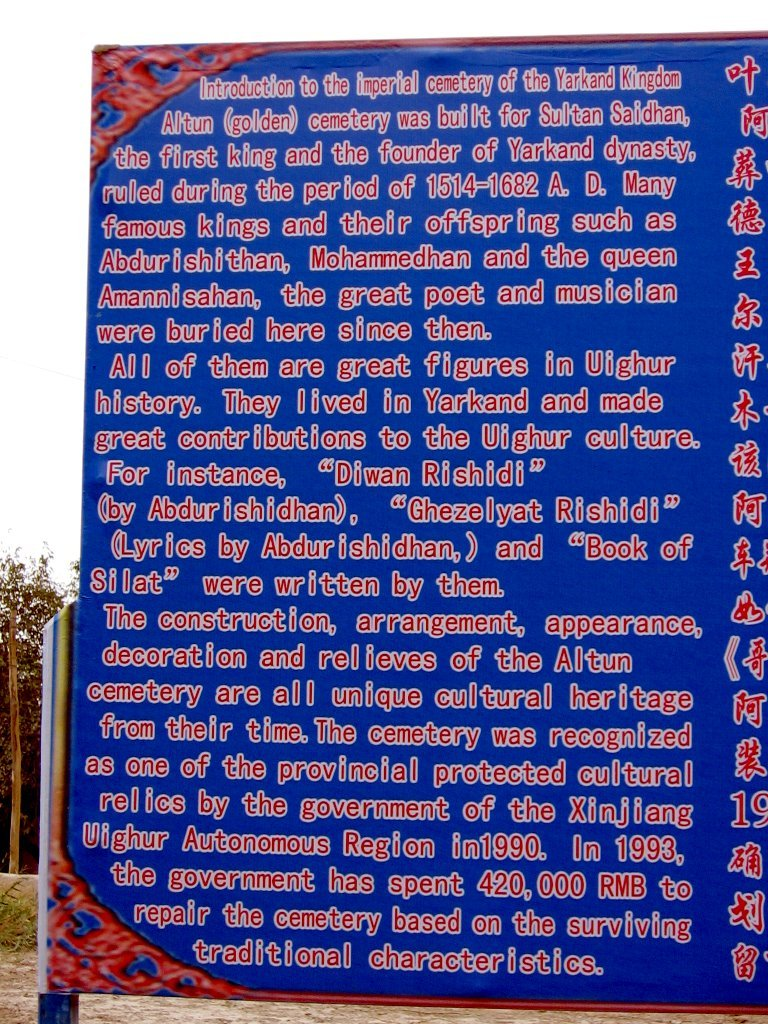
Introduction to the Imperial Cemetery Altun (Golden) of the Yarkand Kingdom in the city of Yarkand, 2005

Shah Shujaʿ al-Din Ahmad Khan (Chagatai and Persian: شاه شجاع الدین احمد خان; commonly known as Khan Shahid) was the Khan of the Yarkent Khanate after death of his father Muhammad Sultan from 1609 to 1618.

== Khanship ==
Shudja ad-Din Ahmad Khan was a ruler of Kashgar and became a Great Khan or Chong Khan of the Yarkand Khanate after the death of his father Muhammad Khan in 1609, who was a 5th son of Abdurashid Khan. Shudja ad-Din Ahmad Khan had 2 sons: elder Ziya ud-Din Ahmad Sultan, more known as a Temur Sultan, born in 1592, and second Abdal Latif Sultan, more known as Afak Khan (1618–1630), born in 1605, who succeeded him as a Great Khan of Yarkand. Temur Sultan was a ruler of Aksu, when his father became a Khan in Yarkand, he gave to Temur Sultan Kashgar and Yangi Hisar instead of Aksu and appointed Mirza Haidar Churas as his Atalik, he died in 1615 during accident with his horse. Portuguese Jesuit Bento de Gois, who visited Aksu in 1604, described him as 12-year old local ruler and a nephew of Muhammad Khan.

During Shudja ad-Din Ahmad Khan rule the break between Western and Eastern parts of the country continued to deepen, because Abduraim Khan (1591–1594, 1605–1634), youngest son of Abdurashid Khan and a Little Khan or Kichik Khan of Eastern part of the country (Chalish-Turpan-Kumul), known at the time as Uyghurstan, considered annexation by Muhammad Khan cities of Bai and Kucha from Eastern part of the country as a violation of the Treaty, concluded between Sultan Said Khan and Mansur Khan in Bai in 1516. Peaceful Treaty of 1516 actually created a Yarkand Khanate as a one centralized state from Kumul to Kashgar and further to Sarikol till the ruby mines of Badakhshan and nominally put Mansur Khan, as an elder brother, into a priority position in the united Yarkand Khanate. Shudja ad-Din Ahmad Khan failed to make a peace with Abduraim Khan and hostilities between two parts of the Yarkand Khanate continued till the death of Shudja as-Din Ahmad Khan in 1618.

== Death ==
Shudja ad-Din Ahmad Khan was killed in 1618 during hunting when his camp in the mountains was attacked at night by 600 armed men of Muhammad Kasim Shah, ruler of Sarikol. Shudja ad-Din Ahmad Khan became a victim of the struggle between Moghul Emirs for the influence and power in the Yarkand Khanate, when he attempted to put Churas Emirs into a privilege position in the Khanate, that caused objection of many other Emirs and Sultans, who used Shah of Sarikol for his assassination. Previously, Abdurashid Khan (1533–1560) of Yarkand Khanate expelled to India practically all Dughlat Emirs, because regarded them aa a threat to his power. Abdul Karim Khan (1560–1591) did the same with Barlas Emirs, who became too powerful under leadership of Muhammad Barlas, Great Emir of Abdurashid Khan, they were all expelled to Mughal Empire of India as well. Shudja ad-Din Ahmad Khan never attempted to perform such radical measures, but tried to reduce the local power of many Emirs and Sultans and to strengthen centralization of power in the hands of a Great Khan of Yarkand, his measures were supported by Churas Emirs, but were met with hate by the others, that cost him his life. After killing of Shudja ad-Din Khan, Kuraish Sultan, who was an uncle of Abdal Latif Sultan and son of Yunus Sultan, was declared a Khan in Khutbah on Friday prayer in Yarkand and by striking a coin with his name by Shah Farbih, newly appointed Hakim of Yarkand, who was an Atalik of Kuraish Sultan. Kuraish Sultan ruled only 9 days. Begs of Kashgar, Yarkand and Yangi Hisar did not recognized him and supported Abdal Latif Sultan, son of killed Khan, as a lawful successor. In the place Shapan, near Yarkand, the battle followed in which Shah Farbih was killed by Atalik of Abdal Latif Sultan Muhammad Yusup Beg, the body of other powerful Shah, Abul-Mani, was not found. Assassin of Shudja ad-Din Ahmad Khan Muhammad Kasim Shah, Muhammad Avez Shah, newly elected Yarkand Khan Kuraish Sultan, were all arrested and executed. This put an end to the influence of Dynasty of Shahs of Badakhshan in the Yarkand Khanate. Second son of Shudja ad-Din Ahmad Khan, Abdal Latif Sultan, was declared a Great Khan of Yarkand , he was only 13 years old at that time and became known as Afak (Beautiful) Khan (1618–1630).

== Genealogy of Chaghatai Khanate ==
In Babur Nama written by Babur, Page 19, Chapter 1; described genealogy of his maternal grandfather Yunas Khan as:

Yunas Khan descended from Chaghatal Khan, the second son of Chengiz Khan (as follows,) Yunas Khan, son of Wais Khan, son of Sher-'ali Aughldn, son of Muhammad Khan, son of Khizr Khwaja Khan, son of Tughluq-timur Khan, son of Aisan-bugha Khan, son of Dawa Khan, son of Baraq Khan, son of Yesuntawa Khan, son of Muatukan, son of Chaghatal Khan, son of Chingiz Khan.

Genealogy of Shudja ad-Din Ahmad Khan if follow the records of Baburnama and Tarikh-i-Rashidi of Mirza Muhammad Haidar Dughlat
1. Chengiz Khan; 2. Chaghatai Khan; 3. Mutukan; 4. Yesü Nto'a; 5. Ghiyas-ud-din Baraq; 6. Duwa; 7. Esen Buqa I	8. Tughlugh Timur; 9. Khizr Khoja; 10. Muhammad Khan (Khan of Moghulistan); 11. Shir Ali Oglan; 12. Uwais Khan(Vaise Khan); 13. Yunus Khan; 14. Ahmad Alaq	15. Sultan Said Khan; 16. Abdurashid Khan; 17. Abdul Karim Khan; 18. Muhammad Sultan; 19. Shudja ad Din Ahmad Khan; 20. Abdal Latif Sultan (Afak Khan)

Research project by Dr Abdul Rauf Mughal

== Sources ==
- James A. Millward (1998). Beyond the pass: economy, ethnicity, and empire in Qing Central Asia, 1759–1864. Stanford University Press. p. 298. ISBN 0-8047-2933-6. Retrieved 2010-11-28.
- Laura Newby (2005). The Empire and the Khanate: a political history of Qing relations with Khoqand c. 1760–1860. BRILL. p. 97. ISBN 90-04-14550-8. Retrieved 2010-11-28.
- Shah Mahmud Churas Chronicles (written in 1670 in Yarkand) Translation and research by Akimushkin O.F. Publishing house of Eastern literature " Nauka", Moscow, 1976
- Kutlukov M (1990). About foundation of Yarkand State (1465–1759). Almata. "Pan" publish house.

== Yarkand Khanate (1514-1705) ==
Preceded by Muhammad Sultan (Yarkand)	Yarkand Khanate Khan; 1609-1618	Succeeded by Kuraish Sultan, ruled only 9 days, Abdal Latif Sultan (Afak Khan)
