= Muhammad Sultan =

Khan of the Yarkent Khanate from 1592 to 1609

Khan of Yarkent
- Reign: 1592 – 1610
- Predecessor: Abdul Karim Khan
- Successor: Shudja ad Din Ahmad Khan
- Born: 1538
- Died: 1610 (aged 71–72)
- Issue: Shudja ad Din Ahmad Khan
- House: Borjigin
- Father: Abdurashid Khan

Muhammad Sultan (Chagatai and Persian: محمد سلطان) was 5th son of Abdurashid Khan and became Khan of Yarkent Khanate from 1592 to 1609 after the death of his elder brother Abdul Karim Khan. He was the ruler who arranged Jesuit Bento de Goes' Caravan, sent by the third Mughal emperor Akbar in 1603, to the border of the Ming dynasty. Gois came to Yarkand in November 1603, was received by Muhammad Khan and spent in the country almost one and a half year, visiting Khotan, Aksu, Kucha, Chalish and Turpan. Gois mentioned that Muhammad Khan was governing the country through his direct relatives like Hen sitting on eggs in the nest , he also indicated that Chalish (Kingdom of Cialis) had very strong fortress, here he had open dispute with local ruler about the God and religion. Some of his diaries were published in Koln in 1618. In 1605 envoy from Abbas I of Persia came to Yarkand with offer to conclude an alliance against Shaybanids, result of negotiations is unknown. Muhammad Khan intensified relations of Yarkand Khanate with Moghul Empire in India, Emperor Akbar sent envoy Shah Muhammad to Yarkand and wrote in one of his letters to Muhammad Khan, that India is a great country, consisting of 7 climates, and Kashmir is under protection of this country, he expressed his desire to establish trade relations with the Ming dynasty and asked Muhammad Khan to help on this matter.

Muhammad Sultan was Hakim (Governor) of Kashgar and Aksu during lifetime of Abdul Karim Khan. He was in expedition on Talas and Chu against Kyrgyz tribes when Abdul Karim Khan died. His brother Abu Said Sultan, who was Hakim in Khotan, tried to take advantage of his absence and to take the khanship. But sympathies of Yarkand emirs were on the side of Muhammad Sultan and he was raised on a white felt and declared a Great Khan (Khaqan-i-Azam or Chong Khan) after returning from expedition, 3 months later of Abdul Karim Khan's death, thus becoming the 4th Great Khan of the Yarkand Khanate (1514–1705).

The rule of Muhammad Khan was featured by successful repelling of Uzbek invasion in 1594, launched by Shaybanid Abdullah Khan II (1583–1598), and the quelling of mutiny of Hudabende Sultan, son of Koraish Sultan, in Chalish and Turpan ( Uyghurstan), who was captured and delivered to Yarkand, while the younger brother of Khan, Abduraim Khan, restored as a Little Khan (Kichik Khan) in Uyghurstan in 1606. Muhammad Khan continued the policy of restriction of power and influence of Barlas emirs that was begun by Abdul Karim Khan. Mirza Sharif Hasan Barlas, grandson of Great Emir of Abdurashid Khan Muhammad Barlas, tried to take position of Hakim of Yarkand, but was dismissed by Muhammad Khan. In response, Mirza Sharif Hasan Barlas took all Barlas tribe people with him and fled to India, where he entered the service of 4th Moghul Emperor of India Sultan Salim or Jahangir (1605–1627).

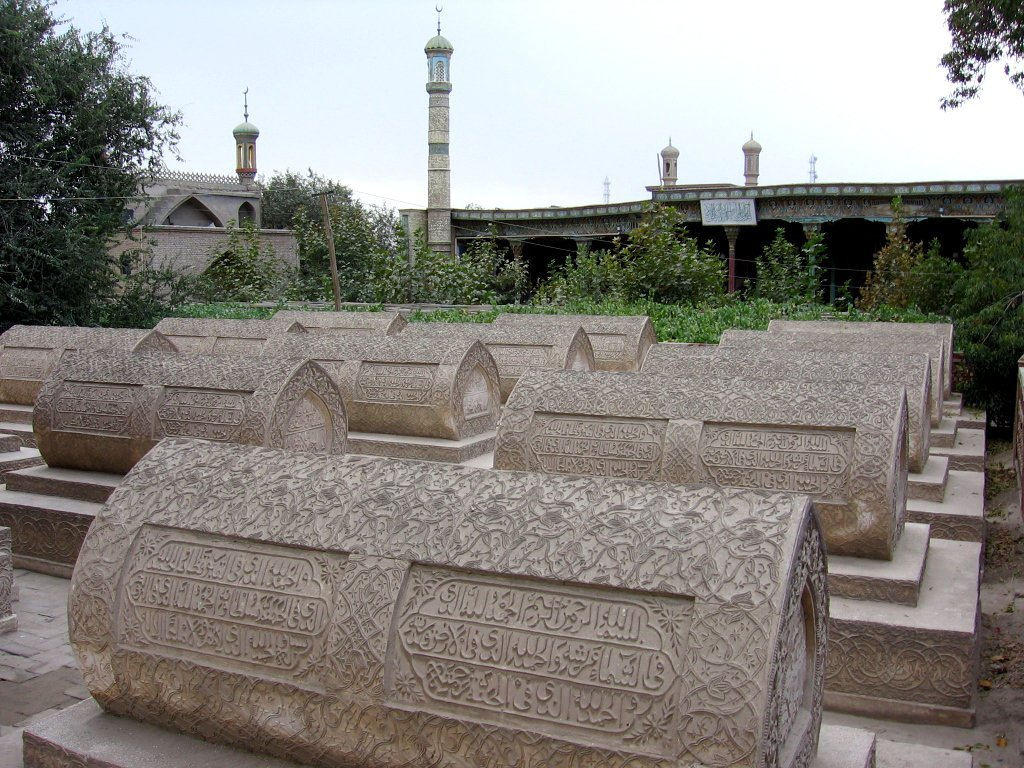
Royal Cemetery Altyn of Yarkand Khanate (1465–1759) in Yarkand, where Muhammad Sultan is resting in peace with members of his family.

== Yarkand Khanate interaction with Khawajas ==
Khoja Ishaq Wali, 4th son of Nakshbandi teacher Mahdum-i-Azam (Great Master), journeyed to Tarim Basin with his disciples upon invitation of Abdul Karim Khan, and after several years he established Sufi Order Nakshbandi Khojagan Ishaqiyya in the Kashgar region, followers of this Sufi Order later became known as Kara Taghliks. His biographer Muhammad Avez claimed that Khoja Ishaq was born from Kashgar wife of Mahdum-i-Azam Bibicha-Aisha, she was from the family of Kashgar Sayyids. Ishaq made Muhammad Sultan his disciple. Before his death in 1599 Ishaq even named Muhammad Sultan the Naqshbandi Grand Master-Ishaq's spiritual successor-thus assuring the Ishaqiyya's continued status in the region. Khoja Yahiya, son of Khoja Ishak, was granted villages Faizabad near Kashgar and also Sang Kash near Khotan together with exclusive right to mine jade in Khotan district by Muhammad Khan.

== Genealogy of Chaghatai Khanate ==
In Babr Nama written by Babur, Page 19, Chapter 1; described genealogy of his maternal grandfather Yunas Khan as:

"Yunas Khan descended from Chaghatal Khan, the second son of Chlngiz Khan (as follows,) Yunas Khan, son of Wais Khan, son of Sher-'ali Aughldn, son of Muhammad Khan, son of Khizr Khwaja Khan, son of Tughluq-timur Khan, son of Aisan-bugha Khan, son of Dawa Khan, son of Baraq Khan, son of Yesuntawa Khan, son of Muatukan, son of Chaghatal Khan, son of Chingiz Khan"

Genealogy of Muhammad Sultanaccording to Tarikh-i-Rashidi of Mirza Muhammad Haidar Dughlat
1. Chingiz Khan; 2. Chaghatai Khan; 3. Mutukan; 4. Yesü Nto'a; 5. Ghiyas-ud-din Baraq; 6. Duwa; 7. Esen Buqa I	8. Tughlugh Timur; 9. Khizr Khoja; 10. Muhammad Khan (Khan of Moghulistan); 11. Shir Ali Oglan; 12. Uwais Khan(Vaise Khan); 13. Yunus Khan; 14. Ahmad Alaq	15. Sultan Said Khan; 16. Abdurashid Khan; 17. Muhammad Sultan; 18. Shudja ad Din Ahmad Khan; 19. Abdal Latif Sultan (Afak Khan)

Research project by Dr Abdul Rauf Mughal

== See also ==
List of Chagatai khans

== Bibliography ==
- Shah Mahmud Churas Chronicles (written in 1670 in Yarkand) Translation and research by Akimushkin O.F. Publishing house of Eastern literature, "Nauka", Moscow, 1976
- Kutlukov M About foundation of Yarkand State (1465-1759) "Pan" publishing house, Almata, 1990

Preceded by Abdul Karim Khan (Yarkand)	Yarkand Khanate Khan; 1592–1609	Succeeded by Shudja ad Din Ahmad Khan
