= Abdal Latif Sultan (Afak Khan) =

Ruler of the Yarkand Khanate from 1618 to 1630

Abdal Latif Sultan (Afak Khan) was the ruler of the Yarkand Khanate in what is now northwest China (Xinjiang) between 1618 and 1630. He was second son of Shudja ad-Din Ahmad Khan, and was only 13 when he became khan. Afak Khan died in 1630 at the age of 25.

In 1644 Balkh historian Mahmud ibn Vali wrote that Afak Khan ruled for 12 years. Mahmud ibn Vali's book, "Bahr al-Asrar" ( "Sea of Mysteries"), was written in 7 parts between 1641 and 1644 in Balkh. Each part contained 4 chapters. The second chapter of 7th part described the rulers of the Yarkand Khanate, or the country of Kashgar and Uyghurstan as he called it, from the time of Sultan Said Khan to the time of Abdal Latif Sultan (Afak Khan).

== Genealogy of Chaghatai Khanate ==
In Babr Nama, which was written by the first Mughal emperor Babur, Chapter 1, Page 19, described the genealogy of his maternal grandfather Yunas Khan as:

Yunas Khan descended from Chaghatal Khan, the second son of Chlngiz Khan as follows: Yunas Khan, son of Wais Khan, son of Sher-'ali Aughldn, son of Muhammad Khan, son of Khizr Khwaja Khan, son of Tughluq-timur Khan, son of Aisan-bugha Khan, son of Dawa Khan, son of Baraq Khan, son of Yesuntawa Khan, son of Muatukan, son of Chaghatal Khan, son of Chingiz Khan.

— Annette Susannah Beveridge, The Babur-Nama in English (Memoirs of Babur)

Genealogy of Abdul Karim Khan according to Tarikh-i-Rashidi of Mirza Muhammad Haidar Dughlat
1. Chingiz Khan; 2. Chaghatai Khan; 3. Mutukan; 4. Yesü Nto'a; 5. Ghiyas-ud-din Baraq; 6. Duwa; 7. Esen Buqa I	8. Tughlugh Timur; 9. Khizr Khoja; 10. Muhammad Khan (Khan of Moghulistan); 11. Shir Ali Oglan; 12. Uwais Khan(Vaise Khan); 13. Yunus Khan; 14. Ahmad Alaq	15. Sultan Said Khan; 16. Abdurashid Khan; 17. Muhammad Sultan; 18. Shudja ad Din Ahmad Khan; 19. Abdal Latif Sultan (Afak Khan)

== See also ==
- List of khans of the Yarkent Khanate
