= Abdul Aziz Mughal =

Son of Abdurashid Khan

According to the historian Ahmad Razi, the fourth son of Abdurashid Khan, named Abdul Aziz Mughal, died a natural death at the age of sixteen. He had two sons Qutab Din and Muhammad Haider. Both his sons accompanied their Uncle Koraish Sultan and migrated to India.

Where they lived in India is not known exactly. Most probably they resided in valley of Jammu and Kashmir.

== Genealogy ==
Genealogy of Abdul Aziz Mughal according to Muhammad Aslam Mughal
1. Abdurashid Khan; 2. Abdul Aziz Mughal; 3. Qutab Din	4. Ebraheem bin Qutab Din; 5. Miran Bakhsh Mughal; 6. Pir Bukhsh	7. Ghulam Rasool Gangi
