= Ghulam Rasool Gangi =

Ghulam Rasool Gangi was a direct descendant of Genghis Khan and the son of Pir Bukhsh. His family moved from Yarkand and Kashgar to India in 1598, where he lived in the Siakolt district of Langrewali. For three generations, Abdul Rashid Khan's descendants were rulers of Khotan and Yarkand, but were scattered geographically until 1707. Quresh Sultan, one of Abdul Rashid Khan's sons, and other Chugtai royal family members were relocated to India during the time of Emperor Akbar.

== 1857 Rebellion ==
Ghulam Rasool and his family hid their identity from the British Imperial Forces because the British were killing Indians that belonged to Mughal tribes. British Indian Sialkot district records show the caste of Ghulam Rasool as Gangi or Kangi, which was probably adopted to hide his identity from the government.

== Family ==
Ghulam Rasool had many children, but their names are not known because they were changed. The names of his sons were Sadawar, Ghaseeta, Nathu, and Jamiat. Terms like Mughal, Beg, Chughtai or Mirza were avoided along with their names to hide their identity. Information about his Chughtai family was mostly collected by Nabi Bukhsh Mughal, a grandson of Sadawar. The legal copyright record is owned by Muhammad Aslam Mughal son of Allah Dita Mughal, a great grandson of Sadawar.

== Genealogy of Chughtai Mughal family of Langrewali, Sialkot ==
Genealogy of Ghulam Rasool according to Muhammad Aslam Mughal
1. Abdurashid Khan; 2. Abdul Aziz Mughal; 3. Qutab Din	4. Ebraheem bin Qutab Din; 5. Miran Bakhsh Mughal; 6. Pir Bukhsh	7. Ghulam Rasool Gangi
