= Koraish Sultan =

Khan of Eastern Moghulistan (Turpan)
- Reign: 1570 – 1588
- Predecessor: Shah Khan
- Successor: Muhammad Sultan
- Born: unknown
- Died: 1591

Koreish Sultan (Chagatai and Persian: قریش سلطان) was son of Abdurashid Khan.

Probably his father appointed him as governor of Khotan since 1533 where he was governing till 1570. After the death in 1570 of Shah Khan in one of skirmishes with Kalmaks, who was a ruler of the Turpan Khanate (then covering Chalish, Turpan and Kumul), Abdul Karim Khan of Yarkand Khanate sent his brother Abduraim Sultan to rule the khanate. The four brothers of Shah Khan expelled Abduraim Sultan and this action started struggle for power between them. One of brothers Abul Muhammad Sultan, or Muhei-me of Chinese sources, declared himself a ruler and sent Embassy to the Ming dynasty, but other 3 brothers didn't recognize him and one of them, Sufi Sultan, or So-fei of Chinese sources, sent another Embassy to the Ming dynasty. Abdul Karim Khan didn't want to see increasing of influence of the Ming dynasty in Uyghurstan and sent Koreish Sultan to subdue Shah Khan's brothers and restore Abduraim Sultan as a Little Khan ( Kichik Khan ) in Turpan. Koreish Sultan conquered Chalish, Turpan and Kumul, but after that refused to give these cities to Abduraim Sultan and appointed himself as a Little Khan. Abdul Karim Khan ordered to another brother Muhammad Sultan to quell Koreish Sultan mutiny and to bring Koreish Sultan back to Yarkand alive. Koreish Sultan managed to repel all attacks on Turpan from Muhammad Sultan troops that were recruited in Aksu, Bai and Kucha, but finally it was decided to peacefully settle this conflict. Chalish was given to Hudabende Sultan, son of Koraish Sultan, while Koreish Sultan was exiled to the Mughal Empire.

On 11 Amardād (about 21 July 1589) Moghul Emperor Akbar travelled to Shihābu-d-dīnpūr in Kashmir. Here Sultan Koreish of Kāshghar arrived and was received with royal favours. His lineage goes back to the great Qāān (Chengiz Khan). He was son of Abdurashid Khan.
