= Ebraheem bin Qutab Din =

Ebraheem bin Qutab Din was an important figure amongst the Mughal family. He was a direct descendant of Chingis Khan and, was son to Qutab Din, their family migrated to India from Yarkand and Kashgar in 1598.

Ebraheem belongs to the last great khan Abdurashid Khan of the Chughtai Khanates of Mughlistan. Though Abdul Rashid Khan's son, grandsons and great grandsons remained rulers of Khotan and Yarkand until 1707 but they were scattered throughout various regions. One of Abdul Rashid Khan's sons Quresh sultan with other Chughtai royal family members shifted to India under Emperor Akbar. Most probably he was living in the Kashmir region.

== Family ==
Ibrahim Mughal had four sons, Miran Bakhsh Mughal, Allah Bakhsh, Muhammad Bakhsh and Rasool Bakhsh.

== Genealogy ==
Genealogy of Ghulam Rasool according to [[Pehchan|Muhammad Aslam Mughal]]
1. Abdurashid Khan; 2. Abdul Aziz Mughal; 3. Qutab Din	4. Ebraheem bin Qutab Din; 5. Miran Bakhsh Mughal; 6. Pir Bukhsh	7. Ghulam Rasool Gangi
