= Miran Bakhsh Mughal =

Miran Bukhsh was the elder son of Ebraheem bin Qutab Din and was great-grandson of Abdul Aziz Mughal. He had three sons, Siraj Din, Pir Bukhsh and Roshan Din. Genealogy records owned by Muhammad Aslam Mughal, currently held in Langrewali, a small village of Sialkot, shows that Miran Bukhsh lived in that district.

== Genealogy ==
Genealogy of Qutab Din according to Muhammad Aslam Mughal
| 1. Abdurashid Khan; 2. Abdul Aziz Mughal; 3. Qutab Din | 4. Ebraheem bin Qutab Din; 5. Miran Bakhsh Mughal; 6. Pir Bukhsh | 7. Ghulam Rasool Gangi |
