= Pir Bukhsh =

Pir Bukhsh was the son of Miran Bakhsh Mughal and was a direct descendant of Abdurashid Khan, who was khan of Yarkand and Khotan (Mughlistan) from 1533 to 1560. Pir Bukhsh had three sons: Fateh Muhammad, Lal Din and Ghulam Rasool Gangi.

== Genealogy ==
Genealogy of Pir Bukhsh according to Muhammad Aslam Mughal
1. Abdurashid Khan; 2. Abdul Aziz Mughal; 3. Qutab Din	4. Ebraheem bin Qutab Din; 5. Miran Bakhsh Mughal; 6. Pir Bukhsh	7. Ghulam Rasool Gangi
