= Tughlugh Timur =

Khan of the Chagatai Khanate from c. 1360 to 1363

Tughlugh Timur Khan
- Khan of The Chagatai Ulus

Khan of the Chagatai Khanate
- Reign: 1360 – 1363

Khan of Moghulistan
- Reign: 1347 – 1360
- Successor: Ilyas Khoja

Khan of the Western Chagatai Khanate
- Predecessor: Shah Temur
- Successor: Khabul Shah
- Born: 1312/13 CE. Chagatai Khanate
- Died: 1363 (aged 50–51); Chagatai Khanate
- Burial: 1363 C.E
- Issue: Ilyas Khoja; Khizr Khoja
Names
- Tughluq Timur Eshan
Era dates
- 14th-Century
- Dynasty: Borjigin
- Father: Esen Buqa I
- Religion: Sunni Islam prev. Tengrism

Tughlugh Timur Khan (Chagatai: توغلوق تیمور خان; Tughluk Timur; 1312/13–1363) was the Khan of Moghulistan from c. 1347 and Khan of the whole Chagatai Khanate from c. 1360 until his death. Esen Buqa (a direct descendant of Chagatai Khan) was his father who was also the former Khan of the Chagatai Khanate. His reign is known for his conversion to Islam and his invasions of Transoxiana.

== Background ==
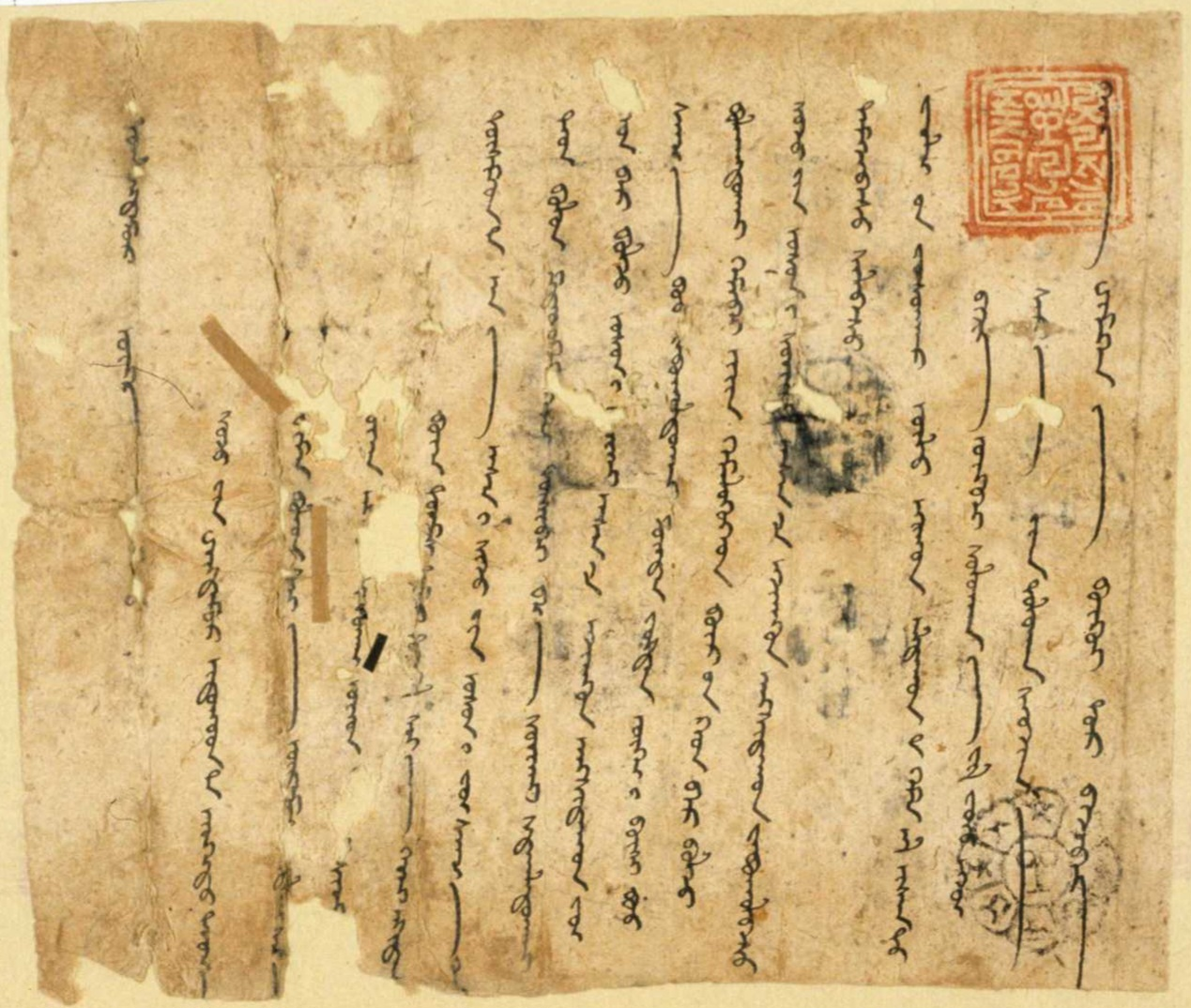
A Middle Mongolian letter issued by Tughlugh Timur during his reign.

After the Chagatayid Qazan Khan was killed in 1346, the Chagatai Khanate underwent a transformation. In the west (Transoxiana), the mostly Turko-Mongol tribes, led by the Qara'unas amirs, seized control. In order to maintain a link to the house of Genghis Khan, the amirs set several of his descendants on the throne, though these khans ruled in name only and had no real power.

The eastern part of the khanate, meanwhile, had been largely autonomous for several years as a result of the khans' weakening power. This eastern portion (most of which was known as "Moghulistan") was, in contrast to Transoxiana, primarily inhabited by Mongols and was largely Buddhist and Shamanist.

The most powerful family in the eastern part of the khanate during this time was a Mongol one, that of the Dughlat amirs. The Dughlats held several important towns as vassals to the khans, including Kashgar, Aksu, Yarkand, and Khotan. In around 1347, the Dughlat amir Bulaji, after seeing the situation in Transoxiana, decided to raise a khan of his own choosing. His choice fell on Tughlugh Timur, who was at that time little more than an adventurer.

== Conversion to Islam ==
Tughlugh was converted by a Muslim cleric Mauláná Arshad al-Din, son of Shaykh Jamal al-Din, who had unwittingly trespassed on the game-preserves of Tughlugh. Tughlugh ordered the shaykh before him and demanded to know the reason for interfering with his hunting. Jamal al-Din answered that he wasn't aware that he was trespassing. At this point, Tughlugh noticed that the cleric was Persian, and Tughlugh said that "a dog was worth more than a Persian." The cleric responded, "Yes, if we had not the true faith, we should indeed be worse than dogs." Puzzled, Tughlugh ordered the cleric to explain the "true faith"; thus was Tughlugh taught the doctrines of Islam. Thereafter, Tughlugh embraced Islam. This act resulted in the amirs of Moghulistan doing the same, although the general population of the region was slower in converting. According to Tarikh-i-Rashidi “He received circumcision, and on the same day 160,000 people shaved their heads and confessed Islam."

== Khanship ==
Meanwhile, in Transoxiana the Qara'unas lost their status as de facto leaders of the Chagatai ulus; they were replaced by Buyan Suldus, an easygoing and ineffective amir. Tughlugh Timur judged that he would face little resistance in Transoxiana and invaded in March 1360. As predicted, most of the tribal amirs declared their support for him; those that didn't (notably Hajji Beg of the Barlas tribe) decided to flee. The Moghuls decided to find someone else to administer Hajji Beg's former territories; they agreed on Hajji Beg's young nephew Timur, who had submitted to them. This, incidentally, was the first step in Timur's rise to power as amir of the Timurid Empire.

The Moghuls soon left Transoxiana after a dispute ensued amongst their amirs. In 1361, however, Tughlugh Timur and his army rode into the region for the second time. This time the khan seems to have decided to depose the Transoxianan amirs and centralize power in his own hands. He executed several amirs, including Amir Bayazid and Buyan Suldus, while Hajji Beg, who had returned following the departure of the Moghuls in 1360, again retreated. When the Qara'unas Amir Husayn opposed him, Tughlugh Timur invaded his extensive territories located south of the Amu Darya and defeated him in battle. Amir Husayn fled; the Moghul army advanced as far south as Kunduz in pursuit of him and plundered the region.

Having destroyed the power of the Transoxianan amirs and reunified the Chagatai Khanate, Tughlugh Timur appointed his son Ilyas Khoja as viceroy of Transoxiana and departed for Moghulistan.

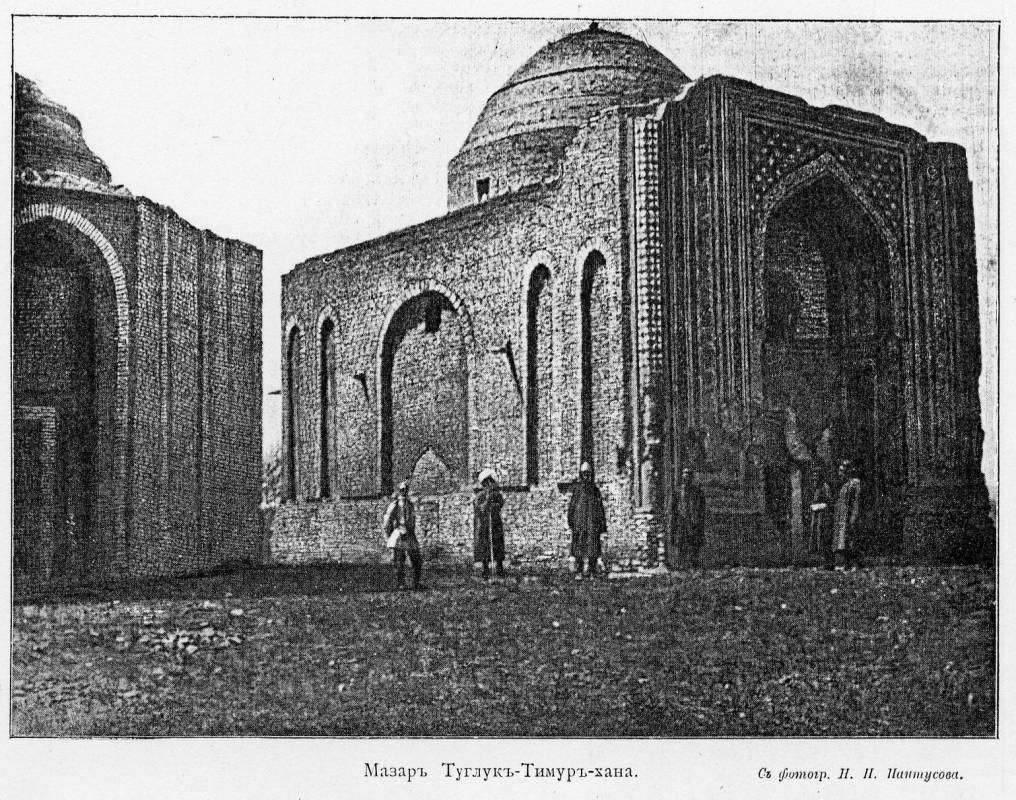
Tughlugh Timur Mausoleum, Almaliq / Damazha, Xinjiang, 44°14′24″N, 80°32′0″E.

Unlike 'Ali-Sultan who murdered the Franciscan missionaries, Tughlugh Timur appears to have been tolerant towards other religions and intellectuals and shared his Chagatayid and Yuan predecessors' interests in Buddhism. In around 1363 he invited the Tibetan lama, Rol-pai Dorji, who was going back from the court of the Yuan Dynasty headquartered in Dadu (modern Beijing). However, the latter politely declined the invitation due to the distance and the Khan's conversion to Islam.

During his reign, the Moghuls (Persian designation of Mongols) still preserved their Mongol identity and spoke in Mongolian language.

Not long after this he died at the age of 34. His tomb is located in Almaliq. His conquest of Transoxiana proved to be short-lived, as Amir Husayn and Timur quickly wrested it from Ilyas Khoja.

== Genealogy of Chaghatai Khanate ==
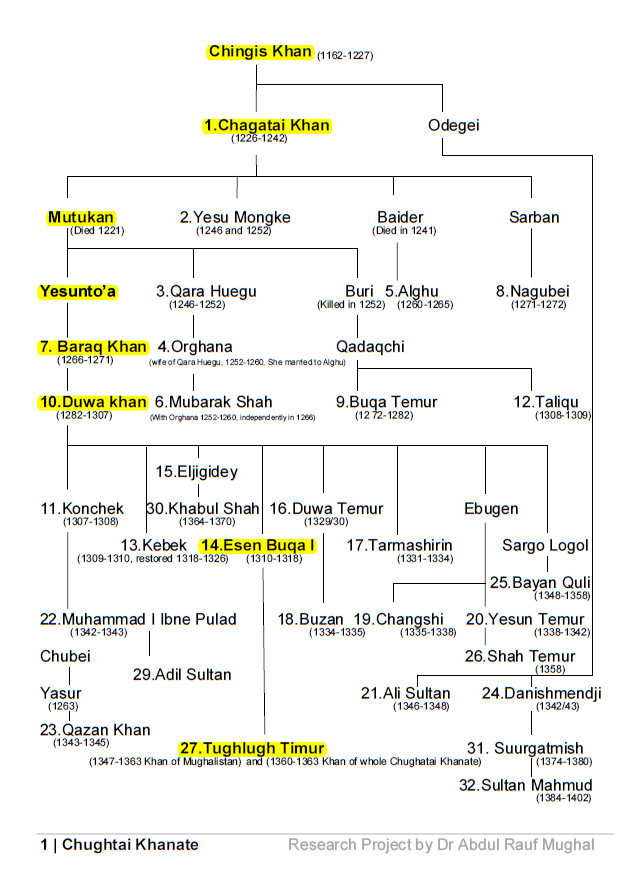
Family Tree

In Baburnama written by Babur, Page 19, Chapter 1; described genealogy of his maternal grandfather Yunas Khan as:

"Yunas Khan descended from Chaghatal Khan, the second son of Chlngiz Khan (as follows,) Yunas Khan, son of Wais Khan, son of Sher-'ali Aughldn, son of Muhammad Khan, son of Khizr Khwaja Khan, son of Tughluq-timur Khan, son of Aisan-bugha Khan, son of Dawa Khan, son of Baraq Khan, son of Yesuntawa Khan, son of Muatukan, son of Chaghatal Khan, son of Chingiz Khan"

Genealogy of Abdul Karim Khan according to Tarikh-i-Rashidi of Mirza Muhammad Haidar Dughlat
1. Chingiz Khan; 2. Chaghatai Khan; 3. Mutukan; 4. Yesü Nto'a; 5. Ghiyas-ud-din Baraq; 6. Duwa; 7. Esen Buqa I	8. Tughlugh Timur; 9. Khizr Khoja; 10. Muhammad Khan (Khan of Moghulistan); 11. Shir Ali Oglan; 12. Uwais Khan(Vaise Khan); 13. Yunus Khan; 14. Ahmad Alaq	15. Sultan Said Khan; 16. Abdurashid Khan; 17. Abdul Karim Khan (Yarkand); 18. Muhammad Sultan; 19. Shudja ad Din Ahmad Khan; 20. Abdal Latif Sultan (Afak Khan)

== Chagatai Khanate ==
Preceded by Shah Temur	Mughlistan Khanate; 1347-63 in Moghlistan and Chagatai Khanate 1360-63	Succeeded by Naqsh-i-Jahan

Preceded by None	Moghul Khan; 1347−1363	Succeeded by Ilyas Khoja
Preceded by Shah Temur	Khan in Transoxiana; 1360−1363	Succeeded by Ilyas Khoja
