= Shams-i-Jahan =

Khan of Mughlistan
- Reign: 1399–1408
- Predecessor: Khizr Khoja
- Successor: Muhammad Khan
- Born: unknown
- Died: 1408
- Issue: Naqsh-i-Jahan; Husn Nigar Khanika; Mihr Nigar Khanika
- House: Borjigin
- Father: Khizr Khoja

Shams-i-Jahan (Chagatai and Persian: شمس جهان) was Khan of Mughlistan from 1399 to 1408.

== Family ==
He was the son of Khizr Khoja. Two of his daughters were married to grandsons of the Central Asian conqueror Timur: Husn Nigar Khanika to Ulugh Beg and Mihr Nigar Khanika to his brother, Muhammad Juki.

== Succession ==
Preceded by Khizr Khoja	Khan of Mughlistan; 1399–1408	Succeeded by Muhammad Khan
