= Kingdom of Mangalai =

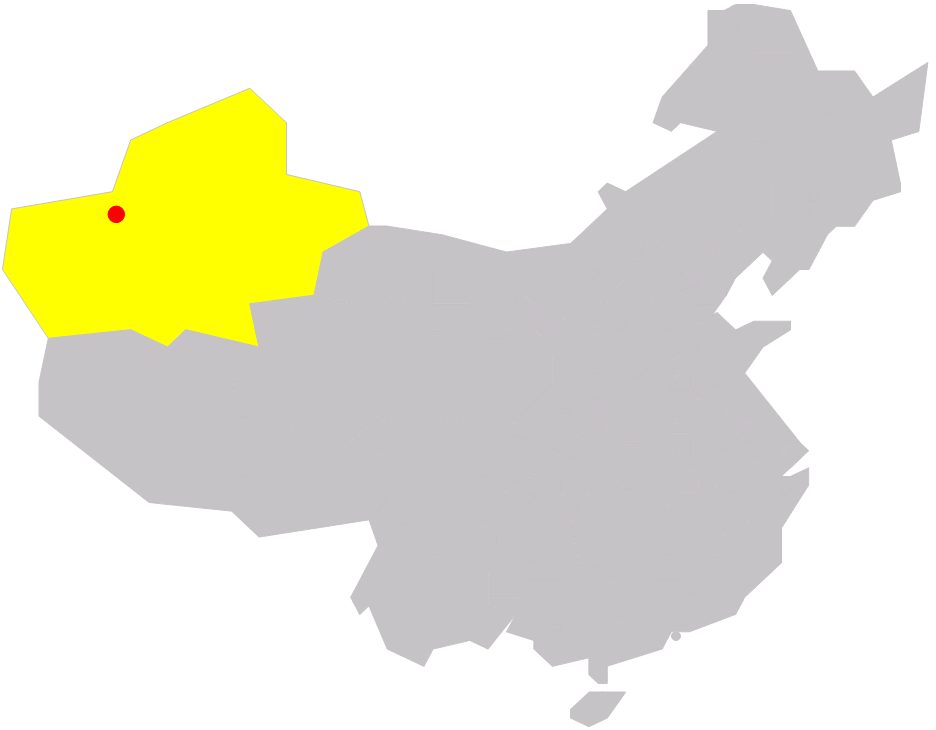
Position of Aksu in East Turkistan (yellow). Aksu was the former capital of Mangalai

The Kingdom of Mangalai (Chinese: 曼尕賴; pinyin: Màngǎlài), also called Mangalai Suyah, was a 13th-century kingdom with its capital in East Turkistan's Aksu city. Mentioned by Marco Polo, it was subservient to Genghis Khan from 1224 to his death in 1227. On the edge of the Yuan dynasty, Mangalai was controlled by the Chagatai Khanate. Its latter history sees periods of autonomy or inclusion of one of many larger kingdoms including: Mogulistan, Kashgar, and Kingdom of Kashgaria. In 1877, the area came under the control of the Qing dynasty and remains part of the Chinese autonomous region of Xinjiang.

== History ==
The territory of Mangalai was described as bound on the east by Bügür and Kucha; to the west by the Kingdom of Fergana; to the north by Issigh-Kul; and to the south by the Yugurs.

Mangalai Suyah was given to Urtubu by Chagatai Khan, the grandfather of Amir Bulaji.

== List of rulers ==
=== Early time and Mongol conquests ===
Date	Ruler's name
1220-c. 1240	Babdagan

Babdagan allied with Genghis Khan and his Mongols (1224–1227) paying taxes to them and providing military assistance thus keeping his kingdom. With the death of Genghis, the area came within the Chagatai Khanate from 1227 to 1348.

Date	Ruler's name
1240c.-1260	Urtu Baraq
1260–1340	unknown
1340–1362	Puladchi

=== 1348-1514 A part of Mogulistan ===
Date	Ruler's name	Notes
1362 – c. 1390	Hudaidad	
c. 1390 – c. 1420	Seyyed Ahmad Mirza	
c. 1420 – 1457	Seyyed 'Ali	
1457–1464	Sansiz Mirza	
1464–1480	Muhammad Haidar Mirza	(in Yarkand 1457–1480)
1480–1514	Mirza Abu Bakr	(the Khoja in Kashgar 1480–1514)
1504–1514	Mansur Khan ibn Ahmad	(Mogulistan 1508–14, Turfan 1503–45) his rule was opposed by Imal Khodja ibn Mansur Khan
1514–1516	Imal Khodja ibn Mansur Khan 1514-1516	Independent from Mogulistan
1516–1521		part of Mogulistan again
1521–1533	Abd ar-Rashid Khan I	(Mogulistan 1533–60)
1534–1588	Muhammad Khan ibn Abd ar-Rashid	Opposed by: Abd al-Karim Khan ibn Abd ar-Rashid
1534–1560	Abd al-Karim Khan ibn Abd ar-Rashid	
1588–1591	Muhammad Baki Sultan	
1591–1596	Shah Khodja ad-Din Ahmad Khan	(at Kashgar 1596–1609)
1596–1609	Timur Sultan	(in Kashgar 1609–1614)
1609–1614	Hashim Mirza Bairin	
1614–1615	Iskandar Sultan	
1615–1632	Sultan Ahmad	
1632–1638	Abdallah Khan	
1638–1641	Gazi Shah Khodja	
1641–1642	Shah Beg	
1642–1651	Shahid Mirza Churas	
1651–1666	Nur ad-Din Khan	(Mogulistan 1669)
1666–1670	Ismail Khan	(Mogulistan 1669, 1670–78, 1679–82)
1670–1743		Part of Kashgar
1743–1755	Ayyub Khodja	
1756–1759	Avdai Beg	
1759–1864		Qing Dynasty China
1864–1866	Sadiq Beg	
1866–1877		Part of the Kingdom of Kashgaria (or Xinjiang)
1877	Hakim Khan Tura	
1877 onward		Part of China
