= Shir Ali Oglan =

14th-century Mongol prince

Sher Ali Oglan (Chagatai and Persian: شیر علی اوغلان) was a son of Muhammad Khan of Moghulistan. According to Moghul historian Mirza Muhammad Haidar Dughlat he was a wealthy prince. He never became Khan of Moghulistan but his son Uwais Khan was khan of Moghulistan.

== Genealogy of Chaghatai Khanate ==
In Babr Nama written by Babur, Page 19, Chapter 1; described genealogy of his maternal grandfather Yunas Khan as:

"Yunas Khan descended from Chaghatal Khan, the second son of Chingiz Khan (as follows,) Yunas Khan, son of Wais Khan, son of Sher-'ali Aughldn, son of Muhammad Khan, son of Khizr Khwaja Khan, son of Tughluq-timur Khan, son of Aisan-bugha Khan, son of Dawa Khan, son of Baraq Khan, son of Yesuntawa Khan, son of Muatukan, son of Chaghatal Khan, son of Chingiz Khan"

Genealogy of Abdul Karim Khan according to Tarikh-i-Rashidi of Mirza Muhammad Haidar Dughlat
| 1. Chingiz Khan; 2. Chaghatai Khan; 3. Mutukan; 4. Yesü Nto'a; 5. Ghiyas-ud-din Baraq; 6. Duwa; 7. Esen Buqa I | 8. Tughlugh Timur; 9. Khizr Khoja; 10. Muhammad Khan (Khan of Moghulistan); 11. Shir Ali Oglan; 12. Uwais Khan(Vaise Khan); 13. Yunus Khan; 14. Ahmad Alaq | 15. Sultan Said Khan; 16. Abdurashid Khan; 17. Abdul Karim Khan (Yarkand); 18. Muhammad Sultan; 19. Shudja ad Din Ahmad Khan; 20. Abdal Latif Sultan (Afak Khan) |
