= Naqsh-i-Jahan =

Khan of Moghulistan
- Reign: 1415–1418
- Predecessor: Muhammad Khan
- Successor: Uwais Khan
- Born: unknown Altin Horde
- Died: 1418

Naqsh-i-Jahan (Chagatai and Persian: نقش جهان) was khan of Moghulistan from 1415 to 1418. He was son of Shams-i-Jahan.

Preceded by Muhammad Khan (Khan of Moghulistan)	Khan of Moghulistan; 1415–1418	Succeeded by Uwais Khan
