= Yarkent Khanate =

Historic state ruled by the Mongols

Yarkent Khanate یارکند سعیدیه خانلیغی يەركەن سەئىدىيە خانلىقى 葉爾羌汗國
- 1514–1705
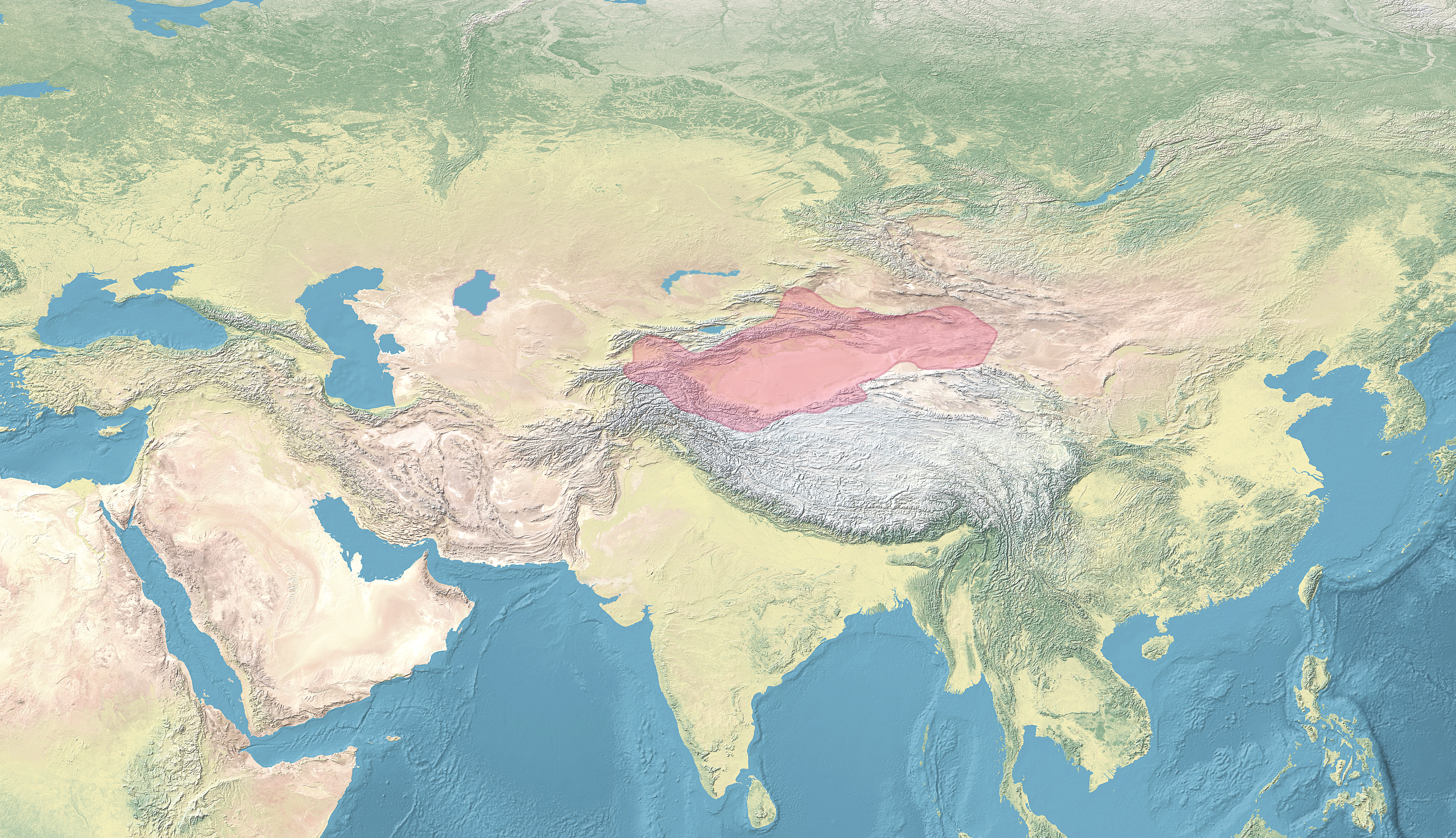
- The Yarkent Khanate, Turpan Khanate, and contemporary Asian polities c. 1600

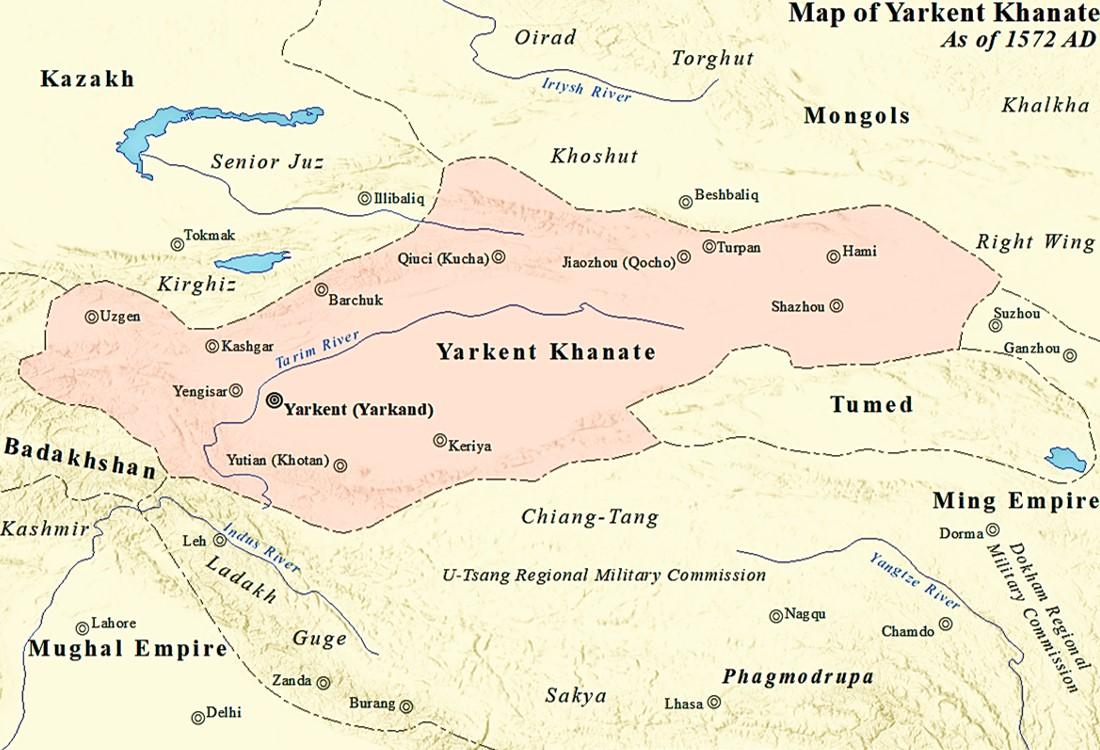
- Capital: Yarkent
- Common languages: Turki (Chagatai language)
- Religion: Sunni Islam
- Government: Monarchy
- Khan
  - 1514–1533 (first): Sultan Said Khan
  - 1695–1705 (last): Sultan Muhammad Mumin Khan
- History
  - Established: 1514
  - Disestablished: 1705
Preceded by	Succeeded by
Moghulistan	Dzungar Khanate
- Today part of: China; Kyrgyzstan

The Yarkent Khanate, also known as the Yarkand Khanate and the Kashghar Khanate, was a Sunni Muslim khanate ruled by the Turkified Mongol descendants of Chagatai Khan, son of Genghis Khan. Its ruling house belonged to the Eastern Chaghatayid, or Moghul, dynasty. It was founded by Sultan Said Khan in 1514 after he took Kashgar, Yarkent and Hotan from the Dughlat ruler Mirza Abu Bakr Dughlat, establishing a new state out of the western territories of Moghulistan, the eastern continuation of the Chagatai Khanate. It was eventually conquered by the Dzungar Khanate in 1705.

== Capital ==
Yarkent served as the capital of the Yarkent Khanate, which was also known as the Yarkent State (Mamlakati Yarkand), from the establishment of the Khanate (1514 AD) to its fall (1705 AD). The previous Dughlat state of Mirza Abu Bakr Dughlat (1465–1514) of Kashgaria also used Yarkent as the capital of state.

== History ==
=== Background ===
The Khanate was predominantly Uyghur/Turki; some of its most populated cities were Hotan, Yarkent, Kashgar, Yangihissar, Aksu, Uchturpan, Kucha, Karashar, Turpan and Kumul. It enjoyed continued dominance in the region for about 200 years until it was conquered by the Dzungar Khan, Tsewang Rabtan in 1705.

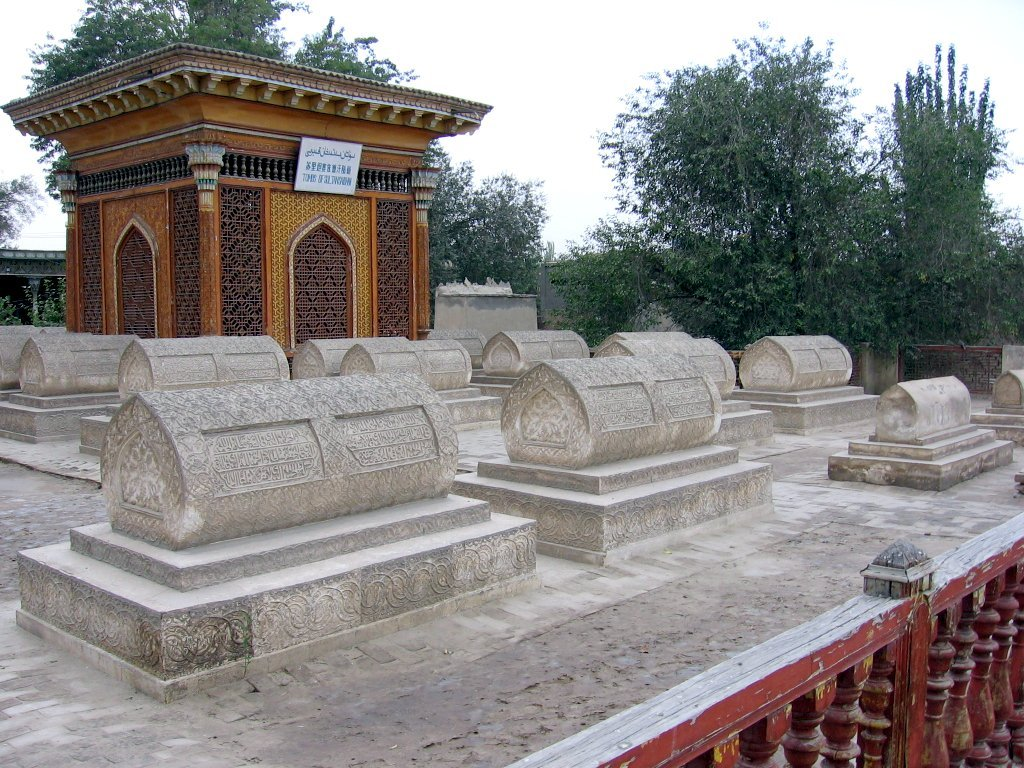
Royal tombs of the Yarkent Khanate at the Altyn Mosque in Yarkand, with tomb of Sultan Said Khan (1533) in the central pavilion

In the first half of the 14th century the Chagatai Khanate had collapsed; on the western part of the collapsed Chagatai Khanate, the Empire of Timur emerged in 1370, and became the dominant power in the region until its conquest in 1508 by the Shaybanids. Its eastern part became Moghulistan, which was created by Tughluk Timur Khan in 1347 with the capital centered in Almalik, around the Ili River Valley. It comprised all the settled lands of Eastern Kashgaria, as well as regions of Turpan and Kumul which were known at the time as Uyghurstan, according to Balkh and Indian sources of the 16th and 17th centuries. The reigning dynasty of the Yarkent Khanate originated from this state, which existed for more than a century.

In 1509 the Dughlats, vassal rulers of the Tarim Basin, rebelled against the Moghulistan and broke away. Five years later Sultan Said Khan, a brother of the Khan of Eastern Moghulistan or Turpan Khanate, conquered the Dughlats but established his own Yarkent khanate instead.

This put an end to the dominance in the cities of Kashgaria of the Dughlat emirs, who had controlled them since 1220, when most of Kashgaria had been granted to the Dughlat by Chagatai Khan himself. The conquest of the Dughlats allowed the Yarkent state to become the foremost power in the region.

=== Reign of Sultan Said Khan ===
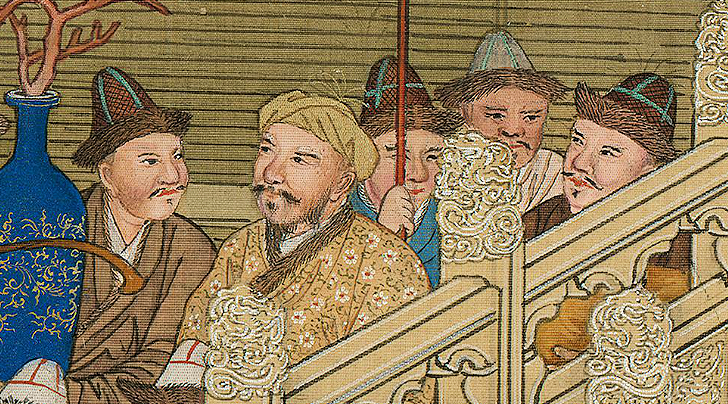
Yarkent dignitaries (葉爾奇木) in Beijing, China, in 1761. 万国来朝图

The reign of Sultan Said Khan was heavily influenced by the khojas. Said Khan also had a close relationship with Babur, his cousin and founder of the Mughal Empire across the Himalayas and Karakoram Range from the Yarkent Khanate.

Said Khan's reign included a campaign in Bolor in 1527–1528, a raid into Badakhshan in 1529, and looting expeditions into Ladakh and Kashmir in 1532. Sultan Said Khan purportedly died in 1533 at Daulat Beg Oldi of a high-altitude pulmonary edema while returning to Yarkent from an expedition into Ladakh and Kashmir.

=== Later Khans ===
Sultan Said Khan was succeeded by Abdurashid Khan (1533–1565), who began his reign by executing a member of the Dughlat family. Abdurrashid Khan also fought for control of (western) Moghulistan against the Kirghiz and the Kazakhs, but (western) Moghulistan was ultimately lost; thereafter the Moghuls were largely restricted to possession of the Tarim Basin.

Meanwhile, the Yarkent Khanate was conquered by the Buddhist Dzungar Khanate in the Dzungar conquest of Altishahr (Note: According to M.Kutlukov, Altishahr historically was a union of 6 cities: four cities in Western Kashgaria-Hotan, Yarkand, Kashgar, Yengihisar and two cities in Eastern Kashgaria: Uchturpan and Aksu. Cities that were located east of Aksu, such as Kucha, Karashar, Turpan and Kumul, were not included in Altishahr. This division first appeared in the 15th century during the struggle between Mirza Abu Bakr Dughlat and the Moghul Khans of Moghulistan, when Mirza Abu Bakr managed to separate Altishahr into an independent state called Mamlakati Yarkand with its capital in Yarkand that he ruled for 48 years from 1465 till 1514. The Moghul khans then managed to establish control of the most of former Uyghuria (856–1389), mediaeval state of Buddhist/ Nestorian/ Manichaenian Kingdom, that included Kucha, Karashar, Turpan, Kumul and Beshbaliq. That state submitted to Chengiz Khan in 1211 under Idikut Baurchuk Art Tekin and joined Mongol Empire as its 5th Ulus and this way retained independence till 1389, when was conquered by Khizr Khoja, son of Tughluk Timur Khan ( founder of Moghul Dynasty (1347–1930), last ruler of which Maqsud Shah of Kumul Khanate died in 1930), who spread Islam among population of Uyghuria. In 1462 Moghul Khan Dost Muhammad managed to wrest Aksu from Dughlat Amirs, later Yunus Khan (1462–1487) spread influence of Moghul Khans till Turpan and Kumul and the settled part of the country south of Tengri Tagh under Moghul Khans became known at this time as Uyghurstan as opposite to the nomadic Moghulistan north of Tengri Tagh. In 1514 Sultan Said Khan put an end to this division and united all territory south of Tengri Tagh from Kashgar to Kumul in one centralized state, known in different sources as Kashgar and Uyghurstan (Mahmud ibn Wali, Balkh, 1640), Saidiyya, Kashgar Khanate or more properly Yarkand Khanate, that existed under dominance of Yarkand Khans till 1706 and under dominance of Khojas till 1759 when it was conquered by Qing China.) from 1678 to 1705.

== List of rulers ==
- List of khans of the Yarkent and Turpan khanates

== Culture ==
The collection of Uyghur Twelve Muqam

== Gallery ==
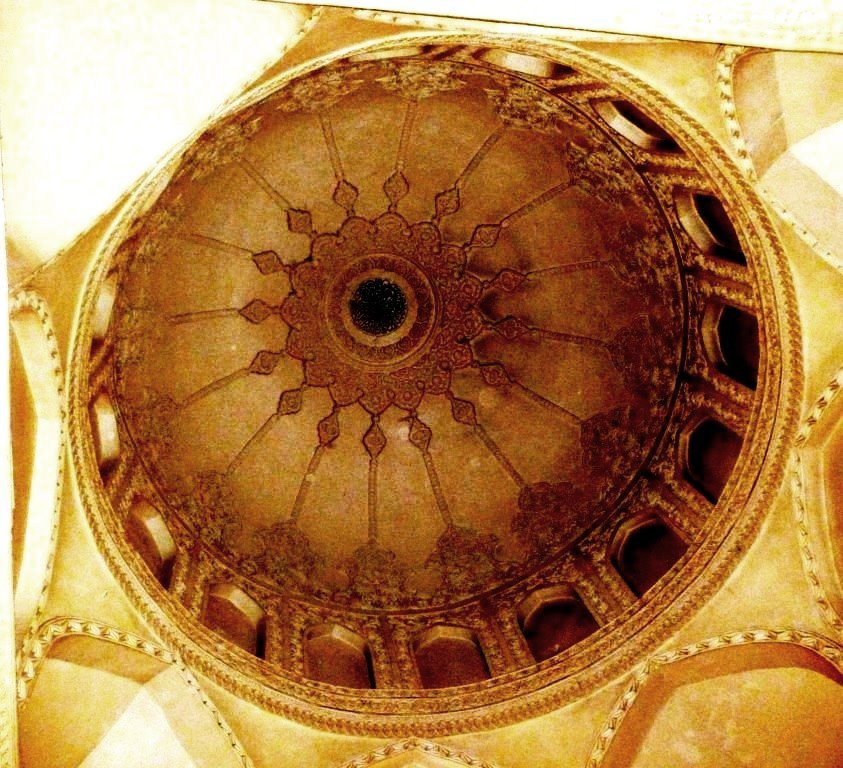
Dome of Amanni Shahan's mausoleum. Yarkand. 2011

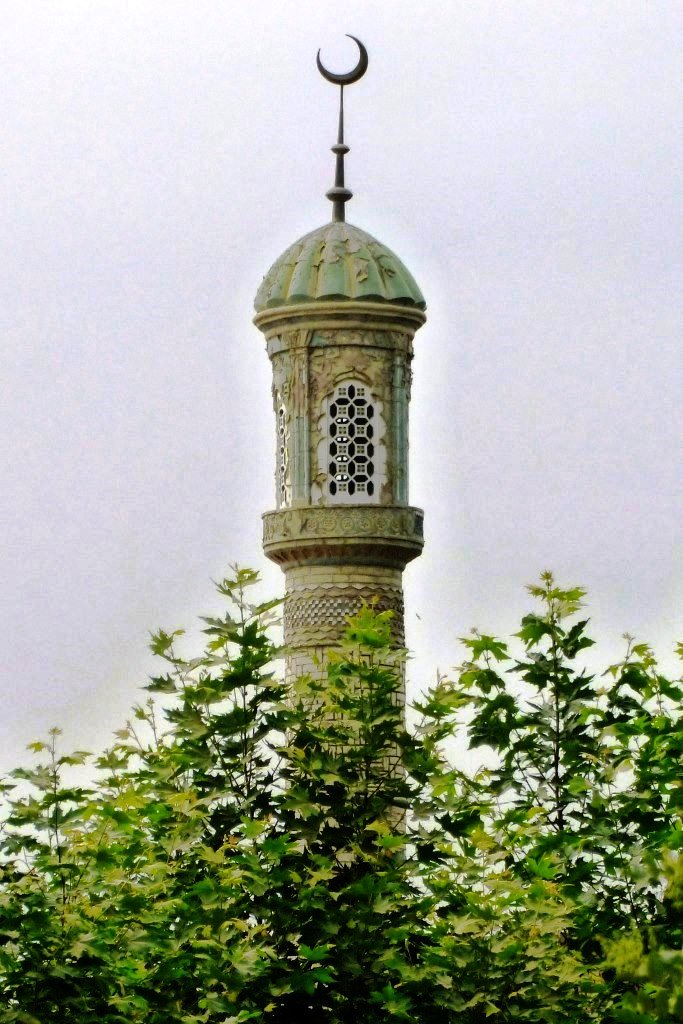
Minaret. Yarkand. 2011

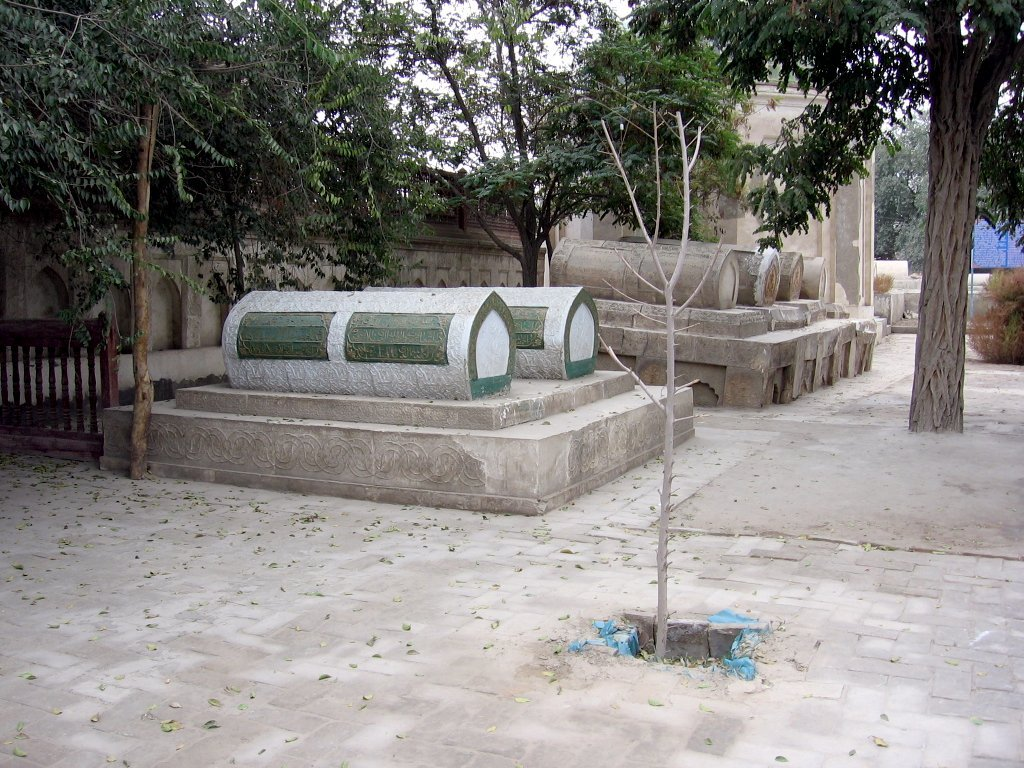

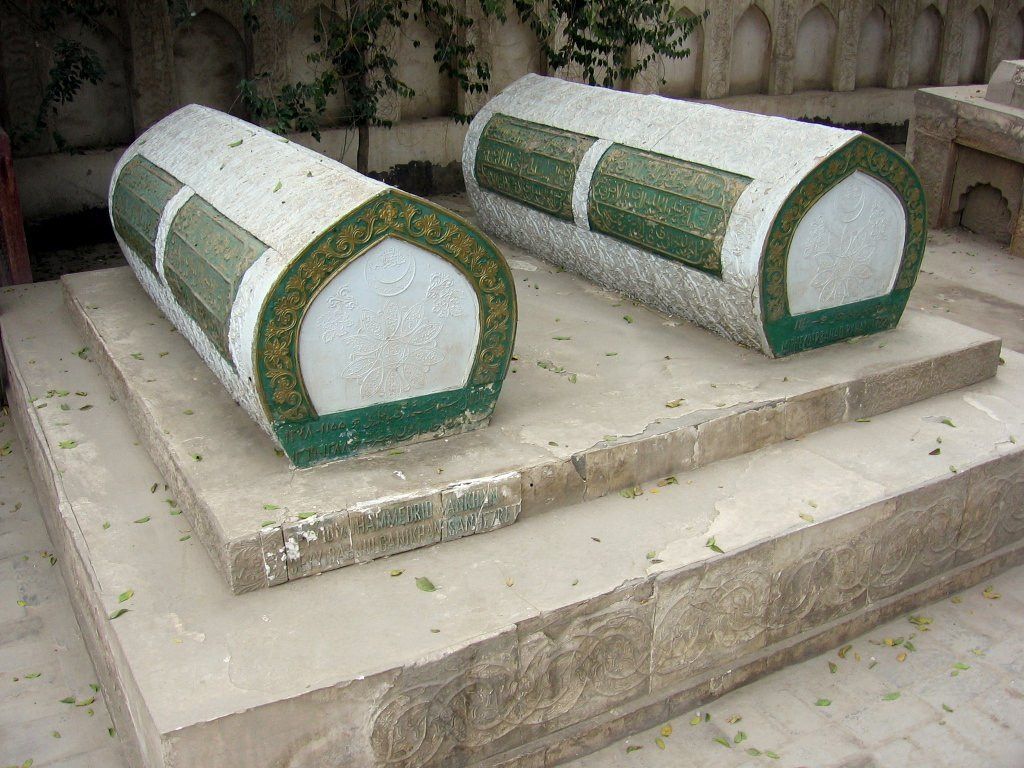

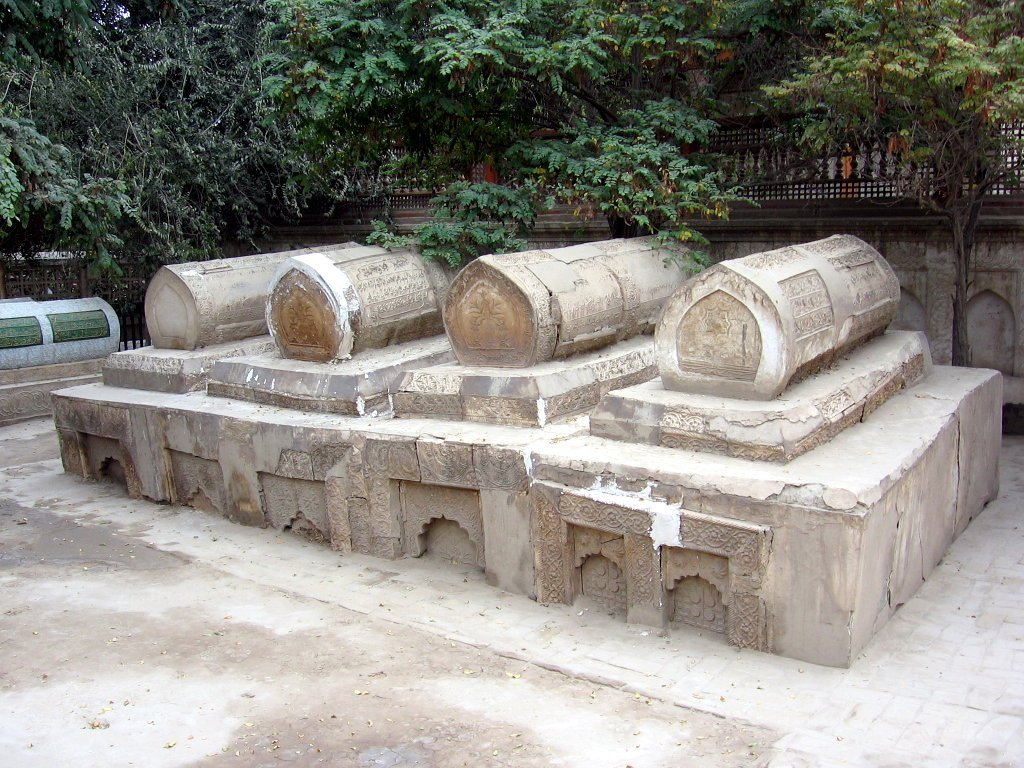

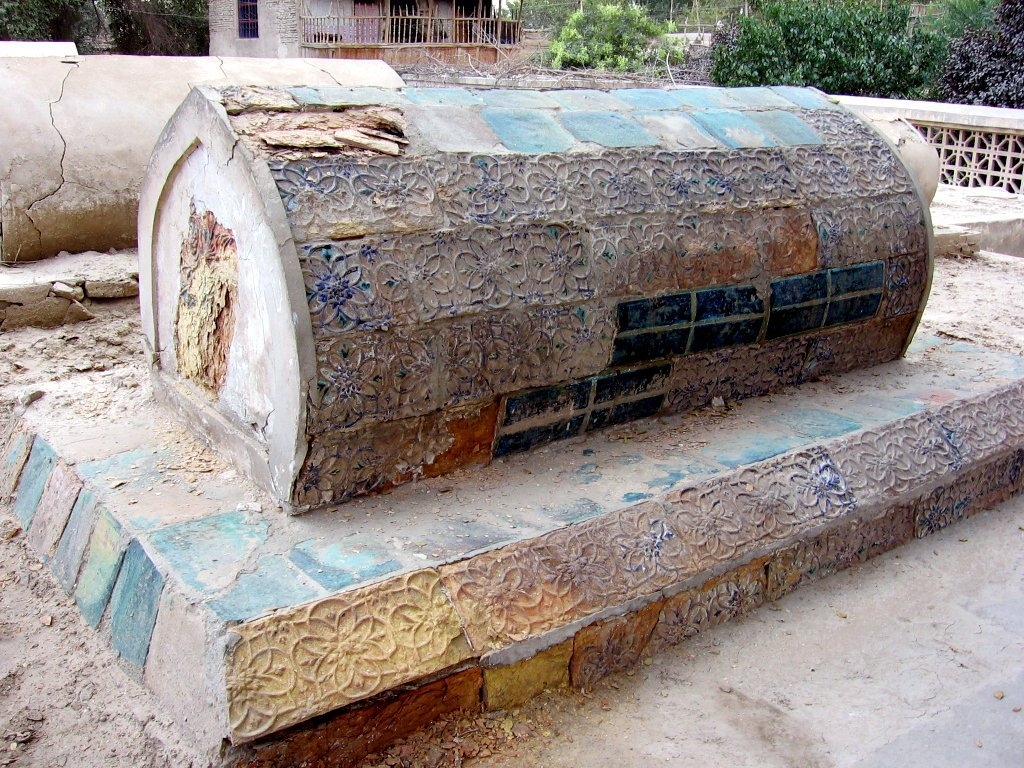

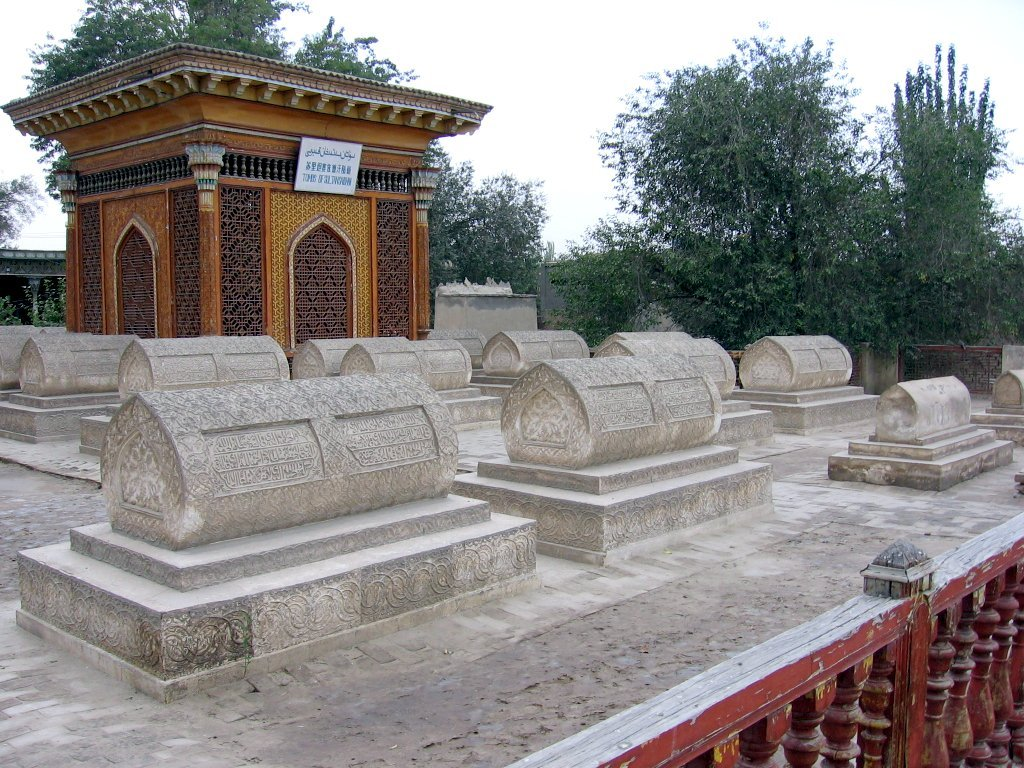

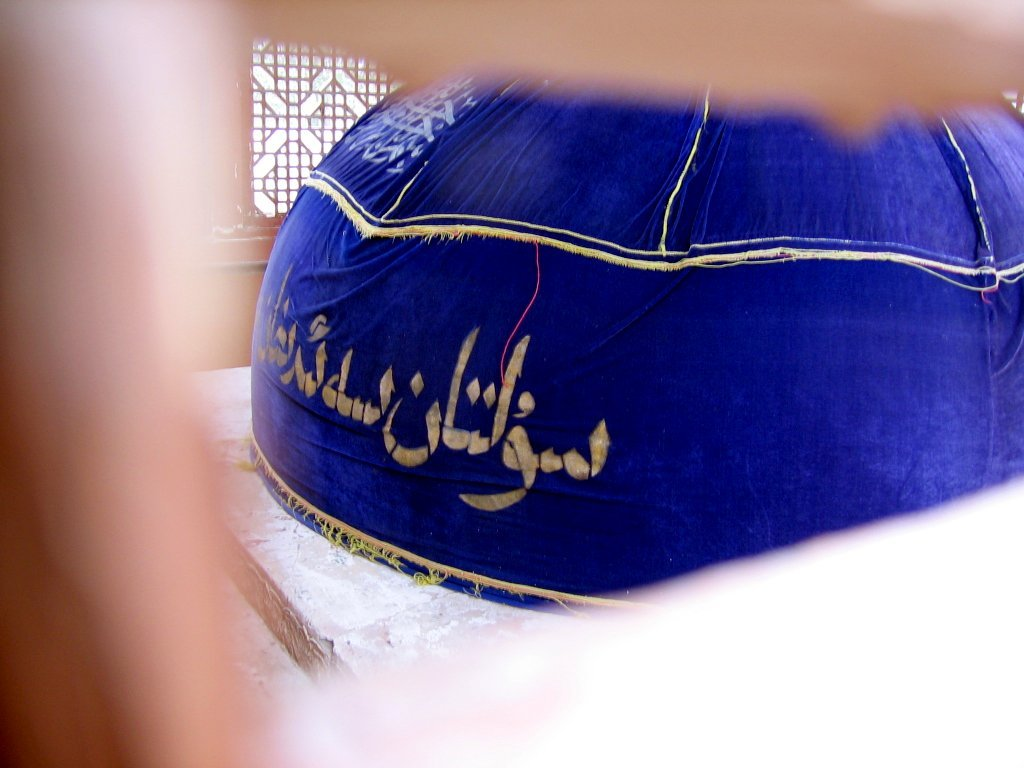

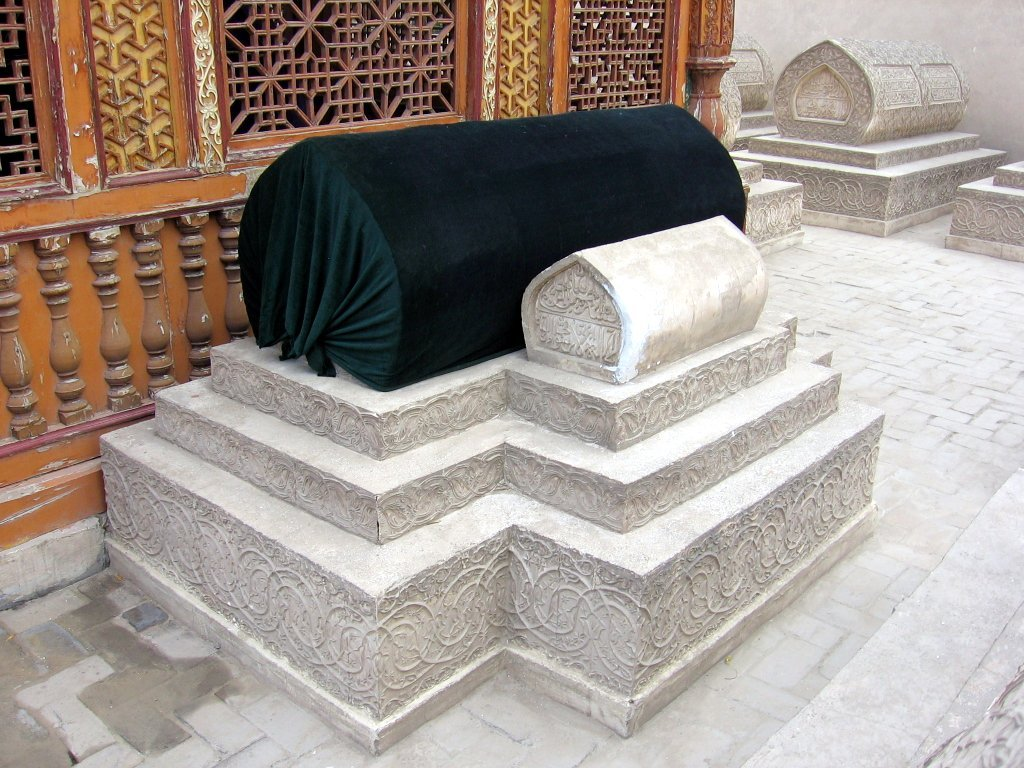

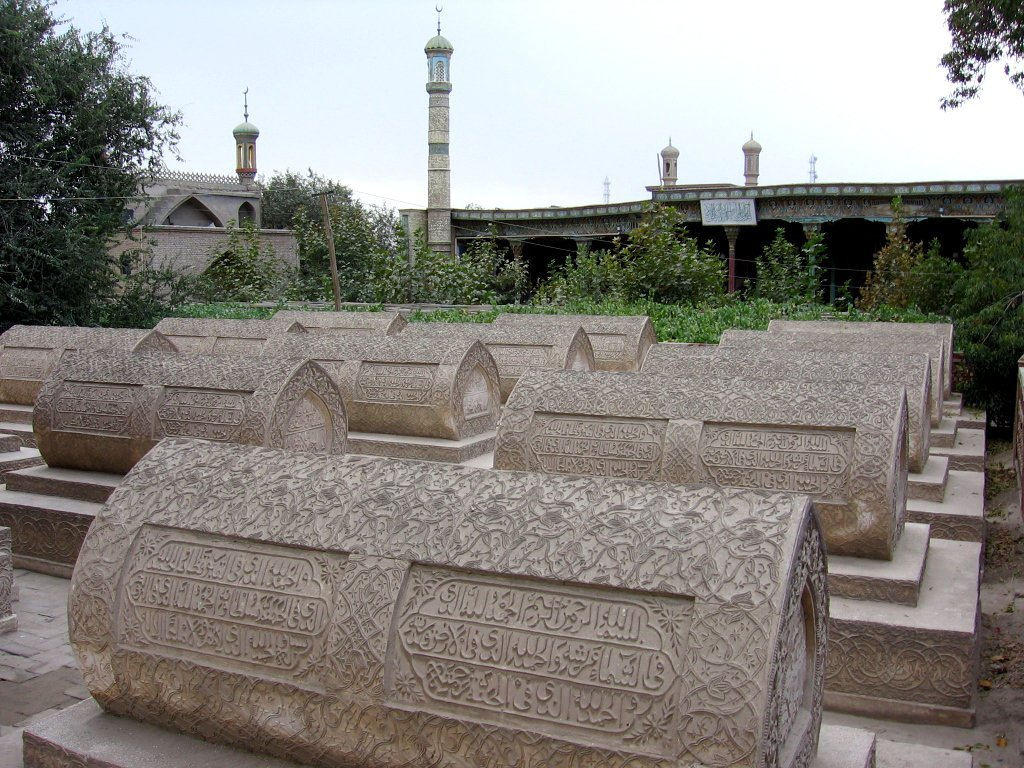

== Bibliography ==
- Saray Mehmet, Doğu Türkistan Tarihi (Başlangıçtan 1878’e kadar), Bayrak Matbaacılık, İstanbul-1997
- Kutlukov M, About foundation of Yarkent Khanate (1465–1759) , Pan publishing house, Almata,1990
- Grousset, Rene (1970), Empire of the Steppes, Rutgers University Press, ISBN 0813513049
