= Mutukan =

Eldest son of Chagatai Khan and grandson of Genghis Khan

- Prince of The Mongol Empire
- Born: Khamag Mongol (Present Mongolia)
- Died: Spring 1221; Bamyan (Present Afghanistan)
- Spouse: Ebuskun
- Issue: Yesü Nto'a; Qara Hülëgü; Büri
- House: Borjigin
- Father: Chagatai Khan
- Religion: Tengrism
- Military career
- Conflicts: Siege of Bamyan †

Mutukan also spelled as Mö'etüken (died 1221), was the eldest son of Chagatai Khan and a grandson of the founding Mongol khagan Genghis Khan. Mutukan was killed during the siege of Bamyan in 1221 by an arrow from the besieged walls. His son was Yesü Nto'a. Yesu' Nto'a was the father of Baraq (Chagatai Khan). Buraq Khan was the khan of Moghulistan from 1266 to 1271.

== Genealogy of Chagatai Khanates ==
In Babur Nama written by Mughal emperor Babur, Page 19, Chapter 1; described genealogy of his maternal grandfather Yunas Khan 12 generations back to Genghis thus:

Yunas Khan descended from Chaghatal Khan, the second son of Chlngiz Khan as follows: Yunas Khan, son of Wais Khan, son of Sher-'ali Aughldn, son of Muhammad Khan, son of Khizr Khwaja Khan, son of Tughluq-timur Khan, son of Aisan-bugha Khan, son of Dawa Khan, son of Baraq Khan, son of Yesuntawa Khan, son of Muatukan, son of Chaghatal Khan, son of Chingiz Khan [Genghis Khan].

Genealogy of Abdul Karim Khan according to Mirza Muhammad Haidar Dughlat
1. Chingiz Khan; 2. Chaghatai Khan; 3. Mutukan; 4. Yesü Nto'a; 5. Ghiyas-ud-din Baraq; 6. Duwa; 7. Esen Buqa I	8. Tughlugh Timur; 9. Khizr Khoja; 10. Muhammad Khan (Khan of Moghulistan); 11. Shir Ali Oglan; 12. Uwais Khan(Vaise Khan); 13. Yunus Khan; 14. Ahmad Alaq	15. Sultan Said Khan; 16. Abdurashid Khan; 17. Abdul Karim Khan (Yarkand)
