= Esen Buqa I =

Khan of the Chagatai Khanate from 1310 to 1318

- Ishan Buqa

Khan of the Chagatai Khanate
- Reign: 1310–1318
- Predecessor: Kebek
- Successor: Kebek
- Died: 1318
- Issue: Tughlugh Timur

Esen Buqa I was Khan of the Chagatai Khanate (1310 – c. 1318). He was the son of Duwa.

In 1309 Esen Buqa's brother Kebek ordered a meeting (quriltai) to determine the future of the khanate following his seizure of power. The meeting resulted in Esen Buqa being proclaimed khan.

== Conflict with the Yuan dynasty and the Ilkhanate ==
Esen Buqa spent the bulk of his reign in conflict with two of his neighbors, the Yuan dynasty of China and the Ilkhanate of Persia. The Chagataid feared a Yuan-Ilkhanate alliance against the state; this fear was caused by the testimony of the Yuan's emissary to the Ilkhanate, Abishqa. The diplomat, while travelling through Central Asia, revealed to a Chagataid commander that such an alliance had been created, and Yuan-Ilkhanate forces were mobilizing to attack the khanate. Abishqa's testimony was never corroborated with any evidence, but Esen Buqa remained convinced of the truth of his statement. However, the Yuan armies repelled his troops twice in 1314. Only after Esen Buqa's death in 1318 and the ascension again of his brother Kebek to the Chagatai throne, allowed peace to prosper again in the region.

== Genealogy of Chagatai Khanates ==
In Babr Nama written by Babur, Page 19, Chapter 1; described genealogy of his maternal grandfather Yunus Khan as:

Yunus Khan descended from Chaghatai Khan, the second son of Chingiz Khan (as follows,) Yunus Khan, son of Wais Khan, son of Sher-'Ali Oghlan, son of Muhammad Khan, son of Khizr Khwaja Khan, son of Tughluq-Timur Khan, son of Esen-bugha Khan, son of Dawa Khan, son of Baraq Khan, son of Yesun Toa Khan, son of Muatukan, son of Chaghatai Khan, son of Chingiz Khan.

Genealogy of Abdul Karim Khan according to Mirza Muhammad Haidar Dughlat
1. Chingiz Khan; 2. Chaghatai Khan; 3. Mutukan; 4. Yesü Nto'a; 5. Ghiyas-ud-din Baraq; 6. Duwa; 7. Esen Buqa I	1. Tughlugh Timur; 2. Khizr Khoja; 3. Muhammad Khan (Khan of Moghulistan); 4. Shir Ali Oglan; 5. Uwais Khan(Vaise Khan); 6. Yunus Khan; 7. Ahmad Alaq	1. Sultan Said Khan; 2. Abdurashid Khan; 3. Abdul Karim Khan (Yarkand)

Preceded by: Kebek	Chagatai Khan; 1310 – c. 1318	Followed by: Kebek

== Sources ==
- Reuven Amitai & Michael Biran, Mongols, Turks, and Others. Koninklijke Brill NV, 2005, ISBN 90-04-14096-4.
