= Ghiyas-ud-din Baraq =

Khan of the Chagatai Khanate from 1266 to 1271

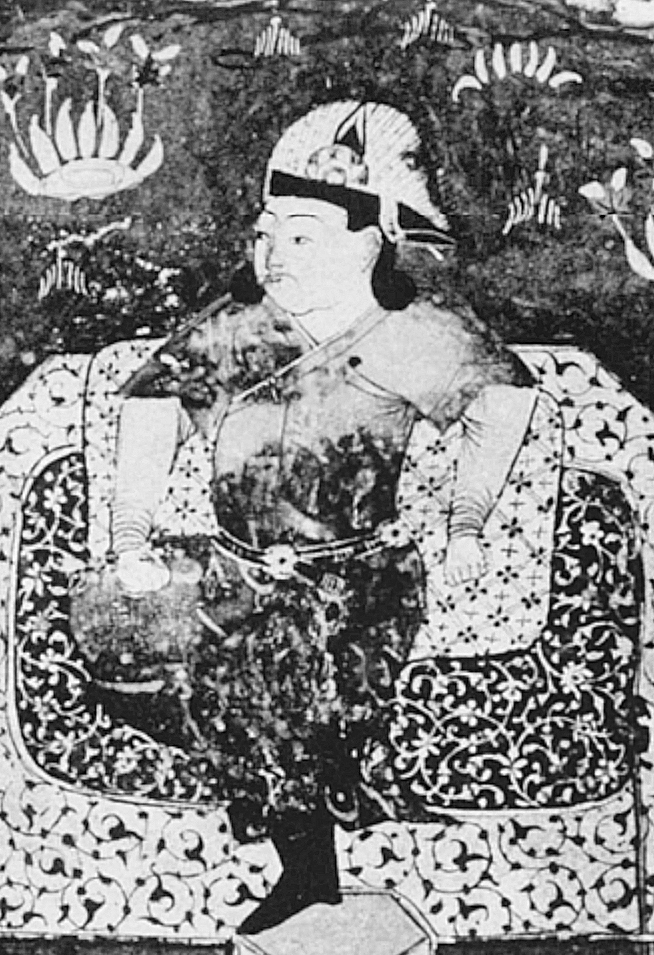
- Portrait of Ghiyas-ud-din Baraq, who usurps the throne of Mubarak Shah (who was converted to Islam), and is recognized as the ruler of the Chaghatay tribe in 664 H. (1266 CE). Jami al-Tawarikh, late 14th century (Asiatic Society, D.31)

Khan of The Chagatai Khanate
- Reign: 1266 – 9 August 1271
- Predecessor: Mubarak Shah
- Successor: Negübei
- Born: Chagatai Khanate
- Died: 9 August 1271; Chagatai Khanate
- Issue: Duwa
- House: Borjigin
- Father: Yesünto'a

Baraq (Chagatai and Persian: غیاث الدین براق) was Khan of the Chagatai Khanate (1266–9 August 1271). He was a son of Yesünto'a and a great-grandson of Chagatai Khan. A convert to Islam, he took the name Ghiyas-ud-din.

== Background ==
Baraq's family had moved to China following his father's exile by the Great Khan Möngke Khan for his support of the house of Ögedei Khan. Baraq grew up in the camp of Kublai Khan and gained distinction there.

== Early 1260s ==
Sometime in the early 1260s he traveled to Central Asia and earned the trust of Mubarak Shah, the Chagatai Khan. When the latter was again enthroned as Chagatai Khan in 1266, Baraq gained support among the army for a coup and deposed Mubarak Shah in September of that year. Almost immediately, he repudiated the authority of Kublai as Great Khan, removed Kublai's representative of Turkestan, and replaced him with one of his own governors. His vastly superior army prevented Kublai's officers from expelling him, and Khotan was ravaged by his forces. Nevertheless, Kublai Khan sent him a grant in 1268, in an effort to end the conflict and focus on Kaidu.

When Kaidu advanced towards Baraq, the latter set a trap for the invader's troops on the bank of the Jaxartes, and defeated his forces. In the next battle, however, Kaidu defeated Baraq near Khujand with the assistance of Mengu-Timur, the Khan of the Golden Horde who sent 3 tumens under his uncle Berkhe-Chir. Transoxiana was then ravaged by Kaidu. Baraq fled to Samarkand, then Bukhara, plundering the cities along the way in an attempt to rebuild his army. These actions alarmed Kaidu, who did not want the region to be further devastated. Kaidu also needed to free up his army for a potential conflict with Kublai. Peace was therefore proposed, and Baraq was pressured by the governors of the sedentary areas of the khanate, Mas'ud Beg and Daifu, to accept. He did, and peace was declared, although sources conflict on the time and location. Rashid al-Din claims that the meeting took place in the spring of 1269 in Talas, while Wassaf writes that it took place around 1267 to the south of Samarkand. In any case, two-thirds of Transoxiana were granted to Baraq, while the other third went to Kaidu and Mengu-Timur. Kaidu also gained control of the region around Bukhara. Neither side gained control of the cities; the direct administration of these instead devolved to Mas'ud Beg, while Baraq and Kaidu agreed to reside only in the deserts and mountains.

Baraq was displeased with the agreement; when Kaidu was preoccupied with Mengu-Timur's attempt to take his portion of Transoxiana, Baraq sent troops to reoccupy Bukhara in violation of the truce. He also later attempted to plunder both Samarkand and Bukhara, and Mas'ud Beg was hard-pressed to prevent this. Still, when he decided to attack the Ilkhanate in order to gain significant pasture, Kaidu agreed, as the Ilkhan Abaqa was an ally of Kublai. Kaidu provided troops for Baraq's invasion of the Ilkhanate, which began in 1269 or 1270. Qipchaq, who had been the one to initially approach Baraq requesting peace, and Chabat, a grandson of Güyük Khan, were among the representatives of Kaidu within Baraq's army. Baraq persuaded a Chaghadaid commander under the service of Abaqa, Tegüder, to revolt, and himself defeated the Ilkhan's forces in Khurasan. Soon afterward, Qipchaq entered into an argument with Baraq's general Jalayirtai, and used this as an excuse to head back to Kaidu. Baraq sent his brother, and later Jalayirtai, to recover Qipchaq, but without success. Soon, Chabat also abandoned the army, though much of his forces were crushed by Baraq's son in Bukhara. Baraq's protests to Kaidu were ineffective; the latter even entered into friendly relations with Abaqa.

== Defeat ==
Having sent much of his troops against the deserters, Baraq suffered a large defeat at Herat on July 22, 1270 against the Ilkhan. Wounded, he fled back to Bukhara, while many of his troops deserted to the enemy. He sent a letter to Kaidu, blaming Qipchaq and Chabat for his loss and requesting assistance. Kaidu sent a large force in response. When Baraq's lieutenants had neutralized the rebels, he wrote that the assistance was no longer necessary, but Kaidu's force continued to approach, with the intention of destroying the power of the Chaghadaids. His army surrounded Baraq's camp, but upon reaching the camp realized that Baraq had died during the previous night. Most of Baraq's generals then submitted to Kaidu's authority. Wassaf, in contrast, claims that Baraq's generals had abandoned him while he was alive, and that Baraq had no choice to submit to Kaidu, who poisoned him. Only a month later, Kaidu had himself crowned Khan and reserved the right to appoint the head of the Chagatai Khanate, a power he retained for the rest of his life. The Chagatai Khans thus became puppets of Kaidu for the next thirty years. His sons, however, would continue to fight Kaidu's authority for a long time after Baraq's death.

== Genealogy ==
In Baburnama, Babur described the genealogy of his maternal grandfather Yunas Khan as:

"Yunas Khan descended from Chaghatai Khan, the second son of Chingiz Khan (as follows): Yunas Khan, son of Wais Khan, son of Sher-'ali Aughlon, son of Muhammad Khan, son of Khizr Khwaja Khan, son of Tughluq-timur Khan, son of Aisan-bugha Khan, son of Dawa Khan, son of Baraq Khan, son of Yesuntawa Khan, son of Mutuken, son of Chaghatai Khan, son of Chingiz Khan"

== See also ==
- Kaidu–Kublai war

Genealogy of Abdul Karim Khan according to Mirza Muhammad Haidar Dughlat
1. Chingiz Khan; 2. Chaghatai Khan; 3. Mutukan; 4. Yesü Nto'a; 5. Ghiyas-ud-din Baraq; 6. Duwa; 7. Esen Buqa I	8. Tughlugh Timur; 9. Khizr Khoja; 10. Muhammad Khan (Khan of Moghulistan); 11. Shir Ali Oglan; 12. Uwais Khan (Vaise Khan); 13. Yunus Khan; 14. Ahmad Alaq	15. Sultan Said Khan; 16. Abdurashid Khan; 17. Abdul Karim Khan (Yarkand)

Preceded by: Mubarak Shah	Khan of Chagatai Khanate; 1266–9 August 1271	Followed by: Negübei
