= Yesünto'a =

Grandson of Chagatai, founder of the Chagatai Khanate

Yesünto'a or Yesun Duwa (也孫篤哇) was the third son of Mutukan, and the grandson of Chagatai—the founder of the Chagatai Khanate. His uncles were Yesü Möngke and Baidar. His nephew Alghu son of Baidar and his brother Yesu Mongke, both were the Khans of the Chagatai Khanate, as were Yesünto'a's sons Qara Hülëgü (1242-1246, 1252) and Baraq (1266–1271).

== Family of Chaghatai Khanates ==
In Babarnama, written by Mughal emperor Babur, Page 19, Chapter 1; described genealogy of his maternal grandfather Yunas Khan as:

"Yunas Khan descended from Chaghatai Khan, the second son of Chingiz Khan (as follows,) Yunas Khan, son of Wais Khan, son of Sher-'ali Aughlon, son of Muhammad Khan, son of Khizr Khwaja Khan, son of Tughluq-timur Khan, son of Aisan-bugha Khan, son of Dawa Khan, son of Baraq Khan, son of Yesuntawa Khan, son of Muatukan, son of Chaghatai Khan, son of Chingiz [Genghis] Khan."

== Genealogy of Abdul Karim Khan ==
According to Tarikh-i-Rashidi of Mirza Muhammad Haidar Dughlat

1. Chingiz Khan
2. Chaghatai Khan
3. Mutukan
4. Yesü Nto'a
5. Ghiyas-ud-din Baraq
6. Duwa
7. Esen Buqa I
8. Tughlugh Timur
9. Khizr Khoja
10. Muhammad Khan (Khan of Moghulistan)
11. Shir Ali Oglan
12. Uwais Khan(Vaise Khan)
13. Yunus Khan
14. Ahmad Alaq
15. Sultan Said Khan
16. Abdurashid Khan
17. Abdul Karim Khan (Yarkand)

"Chughtai Khanates" A research project by Dr Abdul Rauf Mughal

== Sources ==
- The family of the Khans
