= Muhammad Khan (Khan of Moghulistan) =

Khan of Moghulistan from 1408 to 1415

Muhammad Khan II

Khan of Moghulistan
- Reign: 1408–1415
- Predecessor: Shams-i-Jahan
- Successor: Naqsh-i-Jahan
- Died: 1415
- Issue: Sher Muhammad; Sher Ali Oglan; Satuq Khan (possibly)
- House: Borjigin
- Father: Khizr Khoja
- Religion: Islam

Muhammad Khan (Chagatai and Persian: محمد خان) was a son of Khizr Khoja and was Khan of Moghulistan from 1408 to 1415.

Muhammad Khan's brothers included Shams-i-Jahan. After Esen Buqa Khan, excepting Tughlugh Timur Khan, there was no one left in the country of the Moghuls who was of the first rank of Khákáns. After the death of Tughlugh Timur, Amir Kamaruddin murdered all of Tughlugh's sons, so that there was no one left but Khizr Khwaja Khan. This last Khan left many sons and grandsons; the details of the lives of all of them have not, however, been preserved in the Moghul traditions.

In the Moghul records, it is stated that Amir Khudaidad himself raised six Khans to the Khanate, and Muhammad Khan was one of them.

Muhammad Khan built the Rabát on the northern side of the defile of Chádir Kul. The Rabát contains an entrance hall 20 gaz* in height. When you enter by the main door, you turn to the right hand along a passage which measures 30 gaz. You then come to a dome which is about 20 gaz. There is a passage round the dome, and in the sides of it; and in the passage itself are cells. On the western side, there is also a mosque 15 gaz in height, which has more than twenty doors. The whole building is of stone, and over the doors there are solid blocks of stone, He was succeeded by Sher Muhammad as Khan of Moghulistan.

== Genealogy ==
In Baburnama, Babur described the genealogy of his maternal grandfather Yunas Khan as:

"Yunas Khan descended from Chaghatai Khan, the second son of Chingiz Khan (as follows,) Yunas Khan, son of Wais Khan, son of Sher-'ali Aughlon, son of Muhammad Khan, son of Khizr Khwaja Khan, son of Tughluq-timur Khan, son of Aisan-bugha Khan, son of Dawa Khan, son of Baraq Khan, son of Yesuntawa Khan, son of Muatukan, son of Chaghatai Khan, son of Chingiz Khan"

Genealogy of Muhammad Khan according to Mirza Muhammad Haidar Dughlat
1. Chingiz Khan; 2. Chaghatai Khan; 3. Mutukan; 4. Yesü Nto'a; 5. Ghiyas-ud-din Baraq; 6. Duwa; 7. Esen Buqa I	8. Tughlugh Timur; 9. Khizr Khoja; 10. Muhammad Khan (Khan of Moghlustan); 11. Shir Ali Oglan; 12. Uwais Khan (Vaise Khan); 13. Yunus Khan; 14. Ahmad Alaq	15. Sultan Said Khan; 16. Abdurashid Khan; 17. Abdul Karim Khan (Yarkand)

Preceded by Shams-i-Jahan	Khan of Mughlistan; 1408–1415	Succeeded by Naqsh-i-Jahan
