= Duwa =

Khan of the Chagatai Khanate from 1282 to 1307

Khan of the Chagatai khanate
- Reign: 1282–1307
- Predecessor: Buqa Temür
- Successor: Könchek
- Died: 1307
- Spouse: Yeliyiheimishi Beki of Qocho
- Issue: Qutlugh Khwaja; Esen Buqa I Kebek; Könchek; Yasavur; Eljigidey; Duwa Temür; Tarmashirin others
- House: Borjigin
- Father: Baraq

Duwa (Chinese: 都哇; died 1307), also known as Du'a, was Khan of the Chagatai Khanate (1282–1307). He was the second son of Baraq. He was the longest reigning monarch of the Chagatayid Khanate and accepted the nominal supremacy of the Yuan dynasty as Great Khan before his death. Under his rule, the Chagatai Khanate reached its peak.

== History ==
In 1282, Kaidu appointed Duwa as head of the Chagatai Khanate, in an effort to gain peace between himself and the sons of Baraq, who had ravaged Central Asia for much of the past ten years. This promotion ensured the loyalty of the Chaghataids from that point to Kaidu's death. Several years earlier, in 1275, Duwa destroyed a force in Uyghuria loyal to Kublai Khan, led by the Chaghataid Ajiki and Kublai's son Ayachi. The following year, Kaidu and Duwa launched an expedition against Beshbalik, defeated the Yuan forces there and captured the city. The strike given by Kaidu and Duwa was so hard that Uyghurs lost Dzungaria. During the rule of 4th Great Mongol Khan Mongke Khan (1251-1259), Uyghuria lost its privileged status of 5th Ulus of Mongol Empire, granted by Chengiz Khan to Idiqut of Uyghuria Baurchuk Art Tegin in 1211, when he named Idiqut to be his 5th son, and when in 1269 Kaidu began a war against Kublai Khan Uyghuria became a subject of contest between Kublai and Kaidu. To save the people, the entire Uyghur population of Beshbalik in Dzungaria (former summer capital of Uyghur Buddhist / Manichaenian Qocho Kingdom since 856) was evacuated to Kara-Khoja (former winter capital of Uyghur Idiquts since 866) in Turpan Depression by Idiqut Khochqar Tegin (火赤哈兒的斤/huǒchìhāér dejīn), ruler of Uyghuria since 1266, who succeeded Mamuraq Tegin (馬木剌的斤/mǎmùlà dejīn) Idiqut (1257-1266), who succeeded Oghrunch Tegin (玉古倫赤的斤/ ùgǔlúnchì dejīn) Idiqut (1255-1257), who succeeded Salandi (سالندی/sālandī) Idiqut (1245-1255), who succeeded Kishmayin (کیشماین/kīshmāīn) Idiqut (1235-1245), son of Baurchuk Art Tegin (巴而朮阿而忒的斤/bāérzhú āértè dejīn) Idiqut (1209-1235). Idiqut Khochqar reinforced Kara-Khoja defenses while all Uyghur cities in Dzungaria were abandoned by its population and turned into rubble within a few years as a result of these Mongol attacks. Duwa then laid siege to Kara Khoja (present Idiqut Shahri near Turpan) for six months with his brother Buzma by 120,000 troops. They demanded the Uyghur commander Idiqut Khochqar to surrender, having said to him: We have just overcome the resistance of 300,000 troops, how can you with only one city to withstand us? Khochqar replied to them: I will follow my fate and destiny, this city is a place, where I was born and raised, its population has become my own family, if now I have to die, well, then let this city to have become my own grave. Nevertheless, the Mongol princes had failed to take the city by assaults during six months and finally Idiqut Khochqar managed to have the siege lifted only by giving Duwa his daughter in marriage, and probably financial compensation as well. Soon afterwards, in the same 1276, Idiqut Khochqar died in the occasional combat with Kaidu forces near the border of Yuan China. Duwa also may have given assistance to an unsuccessful revolt of Brigung sect against Kublai's authority in Tibet. In 1278 Duwa was reported to have led a raid into Yuan territory.

Kaidu's attempts to spread his power within the Ilkhanate gave Duwa an excuse to invade that Mongol kingdom in early 1295. Supported by Kaidu's son Sarban, he invaded Khurasan and Mazandaran while the Ilkhanid commanders were involved in a succession struggle far to the west. For eight months he stayed in Mazandaran; when he left, he pillaged many cities on the way back. Duwa attempted to convince the Kartids of Herat to defect to his side, but they refused. He attempted to plunder the cities of Kusui, which he failed to do; and Fushang, which he succeeded at, killing many of the inhabitants. A similar attempt on Herat never happened, since Duwa feared he would fail; he soon after was recalled by Kaidu back to Central Asia, and the campaign ended.

Stiffening resistance by the Yuan commanders forced Kaidu and Duwa to pull back several times in 1297. In 1298, Duwa avenged these defeats when he attacked the Yuan garrisons during the winter. Most of the Yuan commanders were eating and drinking and therefore incapable of fighting; the Yuan emperor Temür Khan or Emperor Chengzong's grandson-in-law Körgüz, who had been more ready, was unable to defeat him by himself. Duwa tried to convince him to abandon the Yuan side, but was unsuccessful in doing so. Duwa then withdrew, only to be defeated in battle by the garrison troops in what is today known as Kebuduo. Duwa's brother-in-law was captured in the midst of the defeat. A prisoner exchange was agreed to, and his brother-in-law was returned, but Körgüz died before returning to the Yuan court. In 1298 or 1299 Duwa appointed his son Kutluk Khoja as head of the Qara'unas, a Mongol group that controlled a large part of Khurasan.

In 1300 Yuan forces launched a large offensive against Kaidu. The latter called on Duwa for assistance, but the Chaghadaid refused, claiming his forces were exhausted. Surprised by the answer, Kaidu sent a command to him, but soon had to turn east to meet the Yuan. Still, Duwa and his men eventually came to help him, and during one battle in 1301 he himself was wounded and defeated. Shortly afterward, Kaidu died and the political situation changed. Duwa ignored Kaidu's choice of successor, Orus, and instead picked Kaidu's firstborn son Chapar to take his father's place. Chapar was enthroned in 1303, thanks to Duwa's effort. Duwa insisted Chapar to submit to Temür Khan.

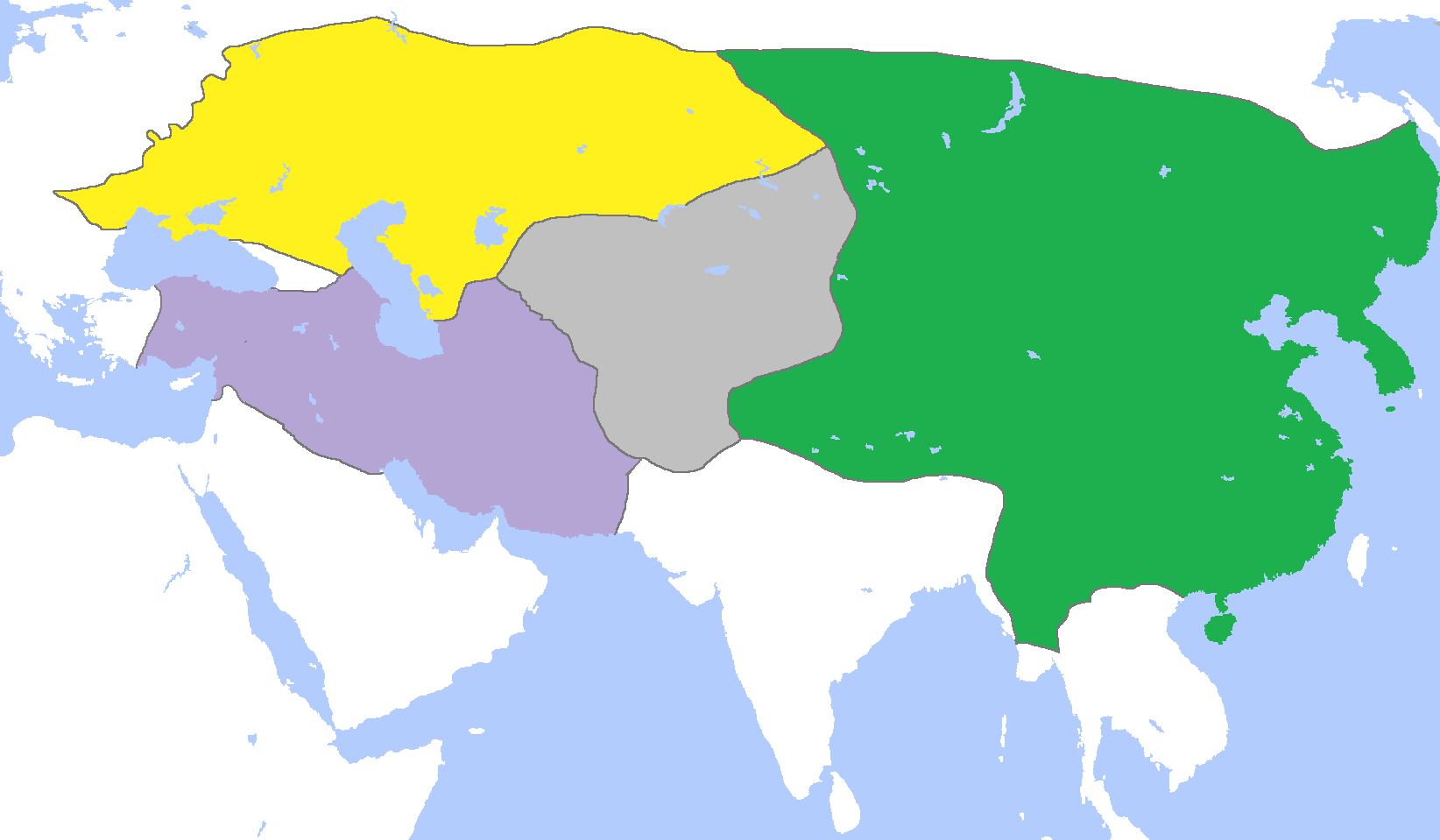
The division of the Mongol Empire, c. 1300.: Yuan dynasty; Golden Horde; Chagatai Khanate; Ilkhanate

Shortly afterward, Duwa sought to end conflict with Temur Khan, and around 1304 a general peace among the Mongol states was declared, bringing a formal end to the Kaidu–Kublai war that had involved all Mongol khanates and lasted for over 30 years since the 1260s. Soon after, he proposed a joint Mongol attack on India, but the campaign did not materialize. The settlement favored Duwa much more than Chapar, a fact which set a rift between the two. Duwa hoped to throw off the mastery of Kaidu's son; he therefore sought to improve relations with Temür Khan. He had the advantage of being a legitimate heir to Chagatai's realm, while Chapar did not.

Chapar refused to attend a meeting that Duwa arranged to celebrate the peace, and in 1305 or 1306 fighting broke out between the troops of both sides, probably due to Duwa's attempts to take control of parts of Chapar's lands granted to him by Temür Khan. The fighting lasted for a while but was inconclusive; while Chapar's brother Sarban gave up to the Ilkhanate and abandoned the Oxus region, but the region around Samarkand continued to be infested with supporters of Kaidu's family. Duwa proposed a peace; Chapar, believing that it was sincere and accepted, withdrawing his brothers. Duwa's forces then struck, defeating Chapar's supporter Baba, plundering Talas and overcoming Chapar's brother Shah. On the eastern front Duwa convinced the border commander of Yuan, Qaishan, to strike and defeat Chapar's brother Orus in June 1306.

Chapar then mobilized his own troops, but several of his commanders deserted him, and the Yuan sent a large force to Duwa's assistance. Surrounded by this army, Chapar surrendered. The northeast part of Duwa's realm was ceded to the Yuan dynasty, and Duwa afterwards received gifts from Temür Khan, signifying the restored relations between the Chagatai Khanate and the Yuan dynasty for the first time since the mid-thirteenth century. Duwa at first gave Chapar a small domain and pension, but afterwards killed or captured many of his followers, and deposed Chapar in 1307 in place of his brother Yangichar, who had not fought Duwa previously. Part of Yangichar's realm was split off and given to Tügme, a grandson of Güyük Khan. That same year, Duwa died, to be succeeded by his son Könchek.

Duwa's actions went a long way toward freeing the Chagatai Khanate from its subservience to Kaidu and his sons, a situation that had lasted since 1271. Nevertheless, Kaidu's sons continued to pose problems for the Chaghadaid state. Duwa's successes in recreating the Central Asian state also proved to be transitory; less than forty years later, the eastern part of the khanate would split off, and in the 1360s the western khans would be reduced to puppets by Timur.

== Genealogy ==
Genealogy of Chaghatai Khanates

In Babur Nama written by Babur, Page 19, Chapter 1; described genealogy of his maternal grandfather Yunas Khan as:

"Yunas Khan descended from Chaghatai Khan, the second son of Chingiz Khan (as follows,) Yunas Khan, son of Wais Khan, son of Sher-'ali Aughlon, son of Muhammad Khan, son of Khizr Khwaja Khan, son of Tughluq-timur Khan, son of Aisan-bugha Khan, son of Dawa Khan, son of Baraq Khan, son of Yesuntawa Khan, son of Muatukan, son of Chaghatai Khan, son of Chingiz Khan."

Genealogy of Duwa Khan according to Tarikh-i-Rashidi
1. Chingiz Khan; 2. Chaghatai Khan; 3. Mutukan; 4. Yesü Nto'a; 5. Ghiyas-ud-din Baraq; 6. Duwa; 7. Esen Buqa I	8. Tughlugh Timur; 9. Khizr Khoja; 10. Muhammad Khan (Khan of Moghulistan); 11. Shir Ali Oglan; 12. Uwais Khan(Vaise Khan); 13. Yunus Khan; 14. Ahmad Alaq	15. Sultan Said Khan; 16. Abdurashid Khan; 17. Abdul Karim Khan (Yarkand)

"Chagahtai Khanates" A research project by Abdul Rauf Mughal

== See also ==
- Kaidu–Kublai war

== Notes ==
Preceded by: Buqa Temür	Khan of Chagatai Khanate; 1282–1307	Followed by: Könchek
