= Ahmad Alaq =

Khan of Eastern Moghulistan from 1487 to 1504

- Khan
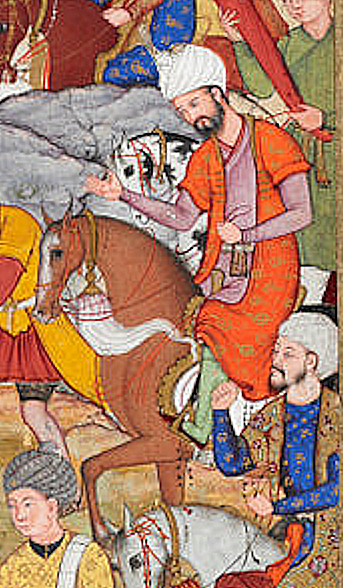
- Sultan Ahmad Alaq meeting Babur in 1502. Painted by the Mughal artist Sanwlah, circa 1590

Khan of the Eastern Moghulistan
- Reign: 1487 – January or February 1504
- Coronation: 1487
- Predecessor: Yunus Khan
- Successor: Mansur Khan
- Born: 1465
- Died: January or February 1504; Aksu
- Spouse: Sahib Daulat Begum
- Issue: Mansur Khan; Said Khan; Aiman Khwajah Sultan
- House: Borjigin
- Dynasty: Chagataids
- Father: Yunus Khan
- Mother: Shah Begum

Sultan Ahmad Khan (Chagatai and Persian: سلطان احمد خان; b. 1465 – 1504), better known as Ahmad Alaq was the Khan of Eastern Moghulistan (Turpan Khanate) from 1487 to 1504. He was the second son of Yunus Khan. His mother was Shah Begum, fourth daughter of Badakhshan prince Lali.

Ahmad Alaq was a direct male-line descendant of Genghis Khan, through his son Chagatai Khan.

== Life ==
During his father's lifetime Ahmad was behind several rebellions against him. When Yunus Khan took up residence in Tashkent in 1484, Ahmad and a large body of Moghuls fled to the steppes. In 1487, Ahmad's father died and was succeeded in the territory he still controlled by another son, Mahmud Khan.

Ahmad's reign was marked by conflicts with several of his neighbors. Conflict in the Ming Turpan Border Wars over Hami with the Ming Dynasty China resulted in an economic blockade of the region, which allowed the Chinese to eventually emerge victorious. A campaign against the Mirza Abu Bakr Dughlat, of the Dughlats of the South-West Tarim Basin, who were in theory vassals of the Moghul khans, resulted in the temporary acquisition of Kashgar in around 1499. In the same year he concluded a peace agreement with Ming China that gave him the opportunity to launch three expeditions against the Kalmyks in the northern part of Moghulistan ( Jettisu ), who occupied this region since the reign of Esen Taishi and his son Amasanji Taishi . Ahmad twice completely defeated them. Because he slaughtered many Kalmyks during these expeditions he was nicknamed Alacha , i.e. Slaughterer.

In the early 16th century, Ahmad and Mahmud decided to counter the growing power of the Uzbeks under Muhammad Shaybani. The two brothers united their forces and launched a campaign against the Uzbeks, but Muhammad Shaybani proved victorious in battle and took them both prisoner (Babur was also among his uncles' army and participated in this battle in Ferghana Valley, that had turned into a disaster, but managed to flee south and hide in mountains with his mother, Kutluk Nigar Khanum, daughter of Yunus Khan, and a few followers). The two brothers were soon released, but Ahmad died shortly afterwards, in 1504. He was succeeded in Uyghurstan by his eldest son Mansur Khan.

== Family ==
Consorts

- Sahib Daulat Begum, sister of Mir Jabar Bardi Dughlat, mother of Mansur Khan, Babajak Khan, Shah Shaikh Muhammad and Maham Khanum;
- Mother of Said Khan, Aiman Khwajah Sultan, and Khadija Sultan Khanum;
- Mother of Lad Shad Khanum, a concubine (umm walad);

Sons

According to Mirza Muhammad Haidar, Dughlat he had 19 sons total, most prominent of whom were:

- Mansur Khan - ruler of eastern Moghulistan or Turpan from 1504 to 1543 (included the cities Aksu, Uch Turpan, Bai, Kucha, Chalish or Karashahr, Turpan and Kumul).
- Iskandar Sultan - who died soon after his father's death.
- Sultan Said Khan - seized power from Dughlat Amirs' Dynasty of Yarkand state in 1514 (known at the time as Mamlakati Yarkand or Kashgar Emirate, included the cities of Kashgar, Yarkand, Yangihissar, Hotan and, for short periods, Aksu and Uch Turpan) in West Kashgaria. In 1516 the western and eastern parts of Kashgaria were united in one centralized state: Kashgar and Uyghurstan. Died in 1533 of asthma during a military expedition in Ursang ( Great Tibet ).
- Babajak Sultan - was in service to Mansur Khan.
- Shah Sheikh Muhammad Sultan - who together with his harem and children was killed by the fall of his palace during an earthquake.
- Sultan Khalil Sultan - ruler of Kyrgyz Khanate from 1504 to 1508. He drowned in a river near Akhsi in the Fergana Valley after he was captured by Uzbek sultans.
- Aiman Khwajah Sultan - who had two sons, Khizr Khwaja Khan married to Gulbadan Begum, daughter of Emperor Babur and Dildar Begum, and Aq Sultan married to Habiba Begum, daughter of Kamran Mirza, son of Babur.
- Chin Temur Sultan - was in the service of both Sultan Said Khan and Mansur Khan, but eventually fled to join Babur in India. He died of dysentery in Agra and was buried there.
- Isan Temur Sultan - fled from the service of Sultan Said Khan and Mansur Khan and joined Babur in India. Married in 1530 to Gulrang Begum, daughter of Emperor Babur and Dildar Begum.
- Thukhta Bugha Sultan - married in 1530 to Gulchehra Begum, another daughter of Emperor Babur and Dildar Begum. He died in 1533.

Daughters

He had four daughters:

- Lad Shad Khanum, married to Muhammad Amir Mirza Dughlat;
- Maham Khanum, married to Builash Khan Uzbeg Kazak, son of Awiq;
- Khadija Sultan Khanum, married firstly to Jahangir Mirza Dughlat, married secondly to Muhammad Sultan Chaghatai;
- Muhib Sultan Khanum, married to Mirza Muhammad Haidar Dughlat;

== Genealogy ==
Genealogy of Chagatai Khanates

In Babr Nama written by Babur, Page 19, Chapter 1; described genealogy of his maternal grandfather Yunus Khan as:

"Yunus Khan descended from Chaghatai Khan, the second son of Chingiz Khan (as follows,) Yunas Khan, son of Wais Khan, son of Sher-'ali Oglan, son of Muhammad Khan, son of Khizr Khwaja Khan, son of Tughluq-timur Khan, son of Aisan-bugha Khan, son of Dawa Khan, son of Baraq Khan, son of Yesuntawa Khan, son of Muatukan, son of Chaghatai Khan, son of Chingiz Khan"

Genealogy of Sultan Ahmad Khan according to Tarikh-i- Rashidi of Mirza Muhammad Haidar Dughlat
1. Chingiz Khan; 2. Chaghatai Khan; 3. Mutukan; 4. Yesü Nto'a; 5. Ghiyas-ud-din Baraq; 6. Duwa; 7. Esen Buqa I	8. Tughlugh Timur; 9. Khizr Khoja; 10. Muhammad Khan (Khan of Moghulistan); 11. Shir Ali Oglan; 12. Uwais Khan(Vaise Khan); 13. Yunus Khan; 14. Ahmad Alaq	15. Sultan Said Khan; 16. Abdurashid Khan; 17. Abdul Karim Khan (Yarkand)

== Chaghatai Khanate ==
Preceded by Yunus Khan	Moghul Khan (in Turpan); 1487–1504	Succeeded by Mansur Khan
