= Abdurashid Khan =

Ruler of the Yarkent Khanate from 1533 to 1560

Khan of Yarkent Khanate
- Reign: 1533 – 1560
- Predecessor: Sultan Said Khan
- Successor: Abdul Karim Khan
- Reign: 1522 – 1524
- Born: c. 1508
- Died: 1560
- Issue: Karim Khan; Muhammad Sultan; Sufi Sultan; Abdurahim Sultan
- House: Borjigin
- Father: Sultan Said Khan

Abdurashid Khan (Chagatai and Persian: عبد الرشید خان), (1508-1560) was the ruler of the Yarkent Khanate.

== Biography ==
Abdurashid Khan was a descendant of the first Moghul Khan Tughluk Timur Khan (1347-1363) and was born in 1508. He came to power in 1533 when his father and predecessor Sultan Said Khan died of altitude sickness during a military expedition in the region of Kashmir.

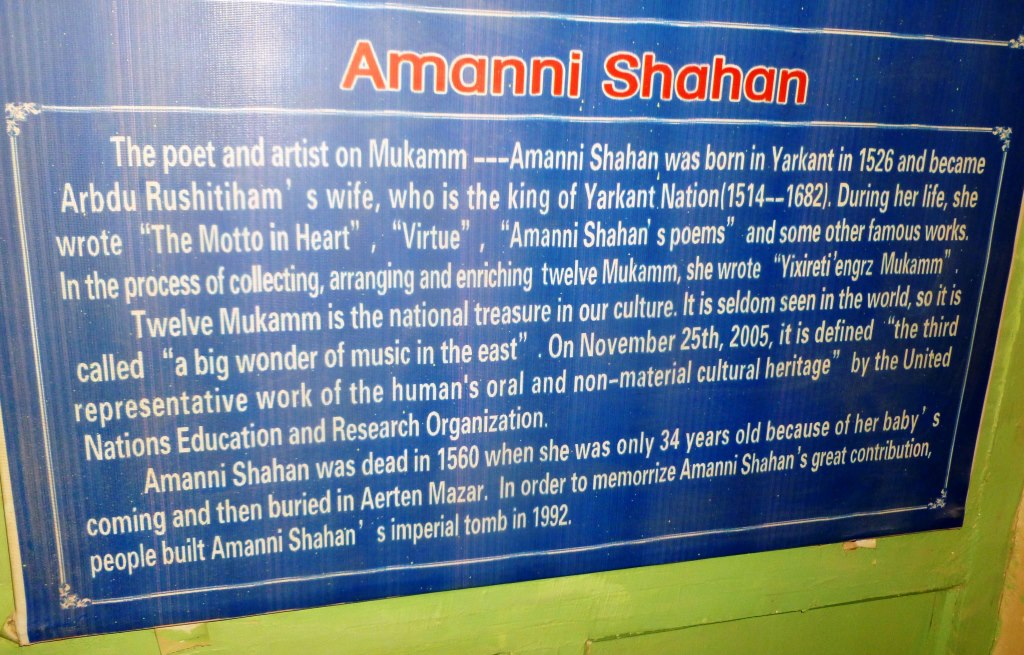
Amanni Shahan sign. Yarkand. 2011

One of Abdul Rasid Khan's wives was Amannisa Khan. She is credited with collecting and thereby preserving the Twelve Muqam, which is today considered one traditional musical style of the Uyghur people of East Turkistan, Today’s Xinjiang Uyghur Autonomous Region. The Muqam of Xinjiang has been designated by UNESCO as part of the Intangible Heritage of Humanity.

In 1538, Abdurashid Khan concluded a treaty with Uzbek Chief Ubaydullah Sultan, who ruled the Khanate of Bukhara at the time (1533–1539). He also completed a similar treaty with the Moghul Empire in India. During the negotiations with Ubaydullah Sultan, a Naqshbandi Sufi teacher Ahmad Kasani (1462–1542), known as Makhdum-i ' Azam (the Great Master) came to Kashgar from Samarkand and was granted land there. His descendants, known as Makhdum Zadas and bearing title "Khoja", played an important role in the history of Xinjiang during the 16th to 19th centuries.

The descendants of Makhdum's eldest son Muhammad Amin (died in 1598), or Ishan Kalan, the founder of the Ishkiyya branch of the Sufi order (tariqa) Naqshbandi khojagan, established themselves in Kashgar and became known as the Aq Taghliks, those of the Tian Shan (or "White Mountains"). The descendants of his second son, Ishaq Wali (died in 1599), founder of branch Ishakiyya of the Sufi order Naqshbandi khojagan, established themselves in Yarkand and became known as the Kara Taghliks, those of the "Black Mountains", i.e. the Pamirs, Karakorum and Kunlun.

Abdurashid Khan was known for the stature of his body and the strength of his hands. He had no equal in shooting with a bow and also was a talented musician. He wrote a music, Shirashangiz, which was very popular in the Yarkand Khanate. He also completely learned 12 Mukams, classical Uyghur music. He liked to change into ordinary clothes, following Khalif Harun al-Rashid, and wander among the population without being recognised. He made three trips to Khotan dressed in this way and he died there during his last trip.

After his death in 1560, Abdurashid Khan was succeeded in Yarkand by his second son Abdul Karim Khan (ruled 1560–1591).

Between 1541 and 1546, the historian and ruler of Kashmir on behalf of Babur's descendants, Mirza Muhammad Haidar Dughlat, wrote a book "Tarih-i-Rashidi" (The History of Rashid). He devoted it to Abdurashid Khan, despite the fact that he had been expelled from Kashgaria by the Khan along with many of his relatives. Kashgaria had been under the rule of his ancestors, the Dughlat Amirs, for about 300 years (1219–1514), beginning with Dughlat Amir Babdaghan (Tarkhan), who was granted the country called "Mangalai Suyah" (Faced to Sun) by Chagatai Khan, second son of Chengiz Khan.

== Royal Cemetery of Yarkand Khanate ==
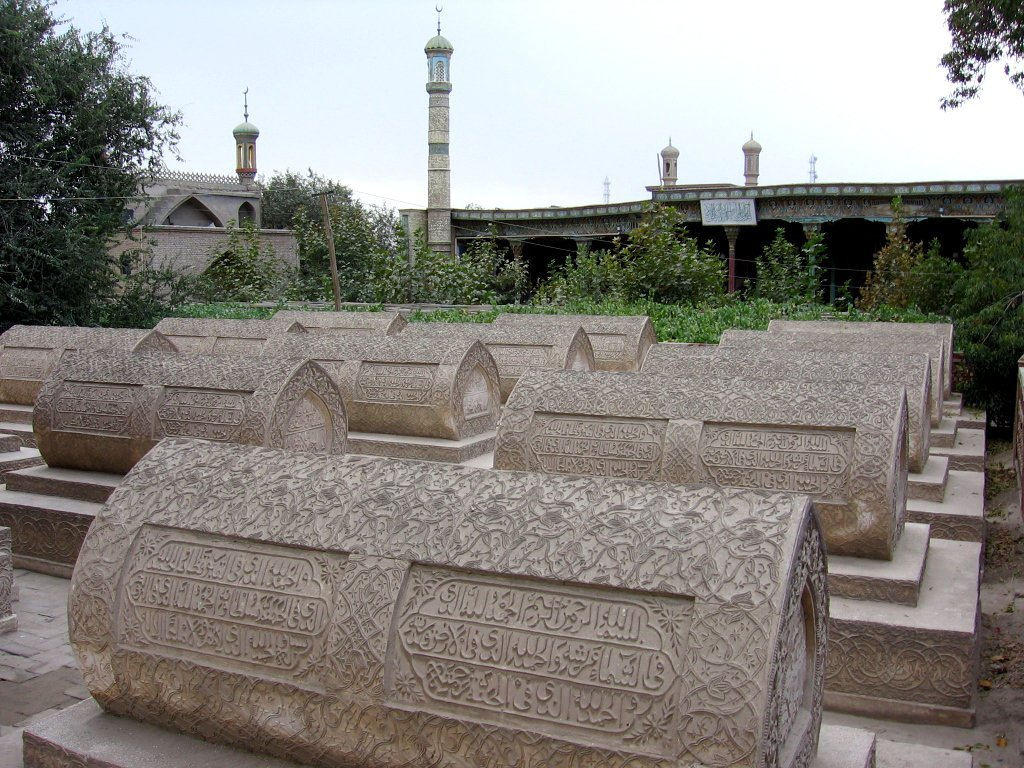
Tombs of Yarkand Khans (near the Altyn Mosque)

Next to Sultan Said Khan are buried Abdurashid Khan, Abdul Karim Khan, Muhammad Khan, Ahmed Khan, Abdul Latif Khan and their descendants, as well as the Muqam (Mukam) -teacher, poet and musician Aman Isa Khan (1526-1560, the wife of the second ruler Abdurashid Khan)

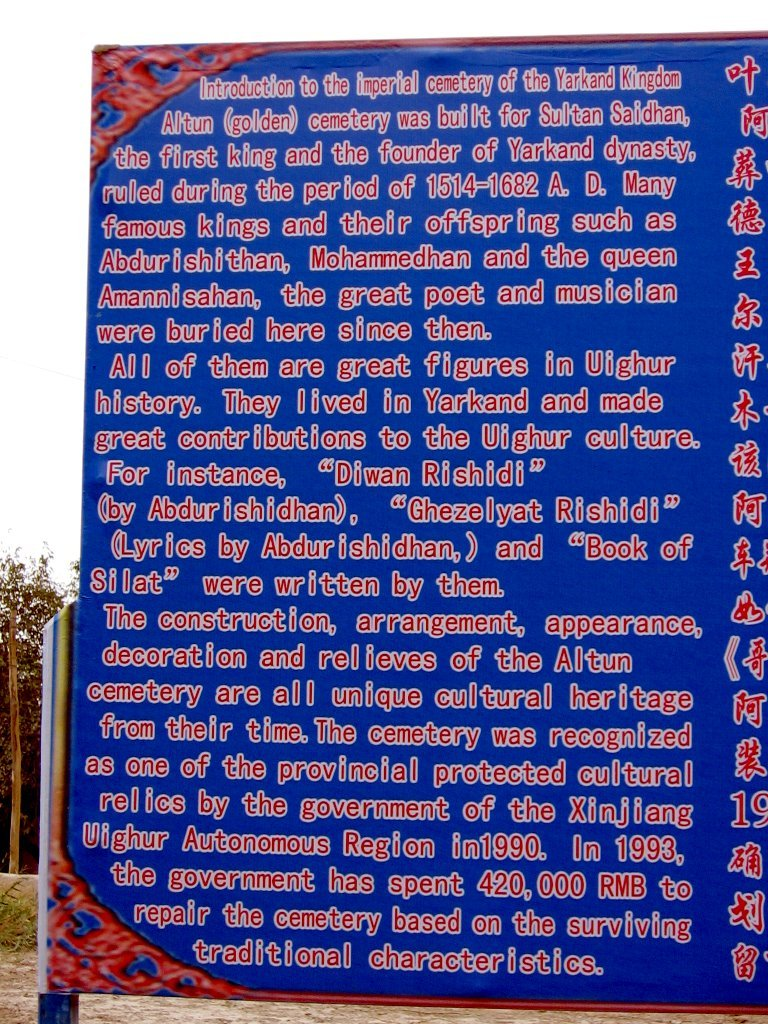

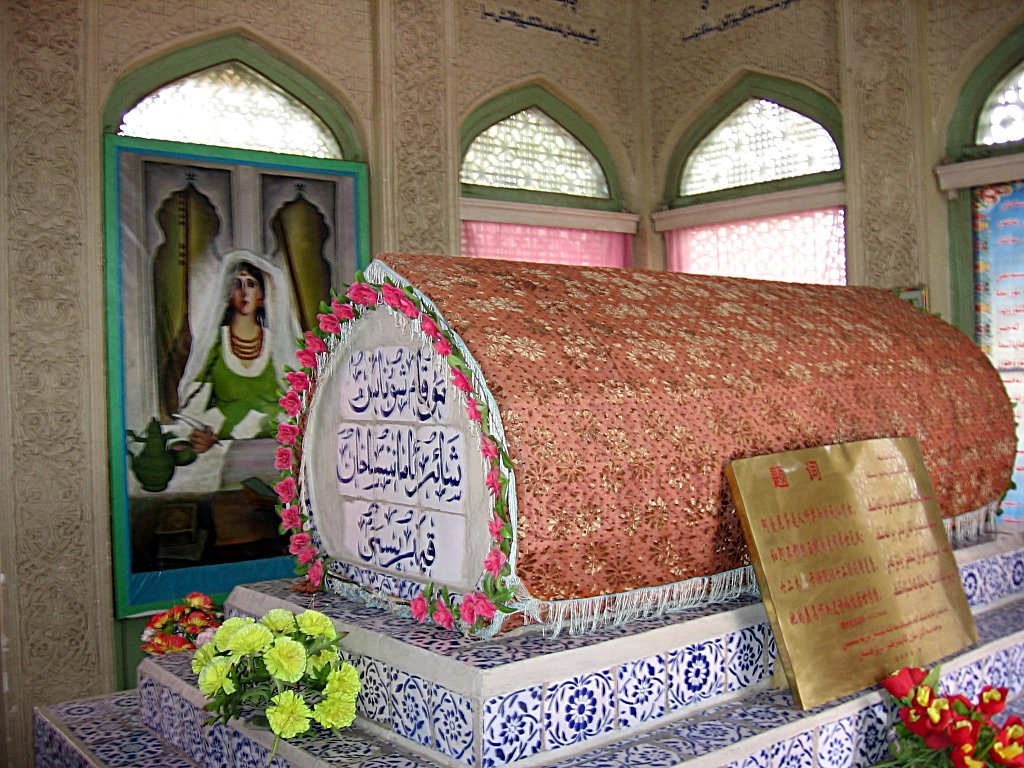
Tomb of Queen Amannisa Khan (died in 1560) in the royal cemetery Altun in Yarkand

== Genealogy of Chaghatai Khanate ==
In Babr Nama written by Babur (Page 19, Chapter 1), the genealogy of his maternal grandfather Yunas Khan is described:

"Yunas Khan descended from Chaghatal Khan, the second son of Chlngiz Khan (as follows,) Yunas Khan, son of Wais Khan, son of Sher-'ali Aughldn, son of Muhammad Khan, son of Khizr Khwaja Khan, son of Tughluq-timur Khan, son of Aisan-bugha Khan, son of Dawa Khan, son of Baraq Khan, son of Yesuntawa Khan, son of Muatukan, son of Chaghatal Khan, son of Chingiz Khan".

Genealogy of Abdul Karim Khan according to Tarikh-i-Rashidi of Mirza Muhammad Haidar Dughlat
1. Chingiz Khan; 2. Chaghatai Khan; 3. Mutukan; 4. Yesü Nto'a; 5. Ghiyas-ud-din Baraq; 6. Duwa; 7. Esen Buqa I	8. Tughlugh Timur; 9. Khizr Khoja; 10. Muhammad Khan (Khan of Moghulistan); 11. Shir Ali Oglan; 12. Uwais Khan(Vaise Khan); 13. Yunus Khan; 14. Ahmad Alaq	15. Sultan Said Khan; 16. Abdurashid Khan; 17. Abdul Karim Khan; 18. Muhammad Sultan; 19. Shudja ad Din Ahmad Khan; 20. Abdal Latif Sultan (Afak Khan)

Research project by Dr Abdul Rauf Mughal

== Moghul Khanate (Kashgaria) ==
Preceded by Sultan Said Khan	Yarkent Khanate; 1533–1560	Succeeded by Abdul Karim Khan

== Notes ==
- http://www.historyfiles.co.uk/KingListsFarEast/AsiaKyrgyzstan.htm
- https://web.archive.org/web/20111111150613/http://persian.packhum.org/persian/main?url=pf%3Ffile%3D06901021%26ct%3D10
- http://www.orientalstudies.ru/eng/index.php?option=com_publications&Itemid=75&pub=1416
