= Timeline of the Chagatai Khanate =

Chagatai Khanate, late 13th century.

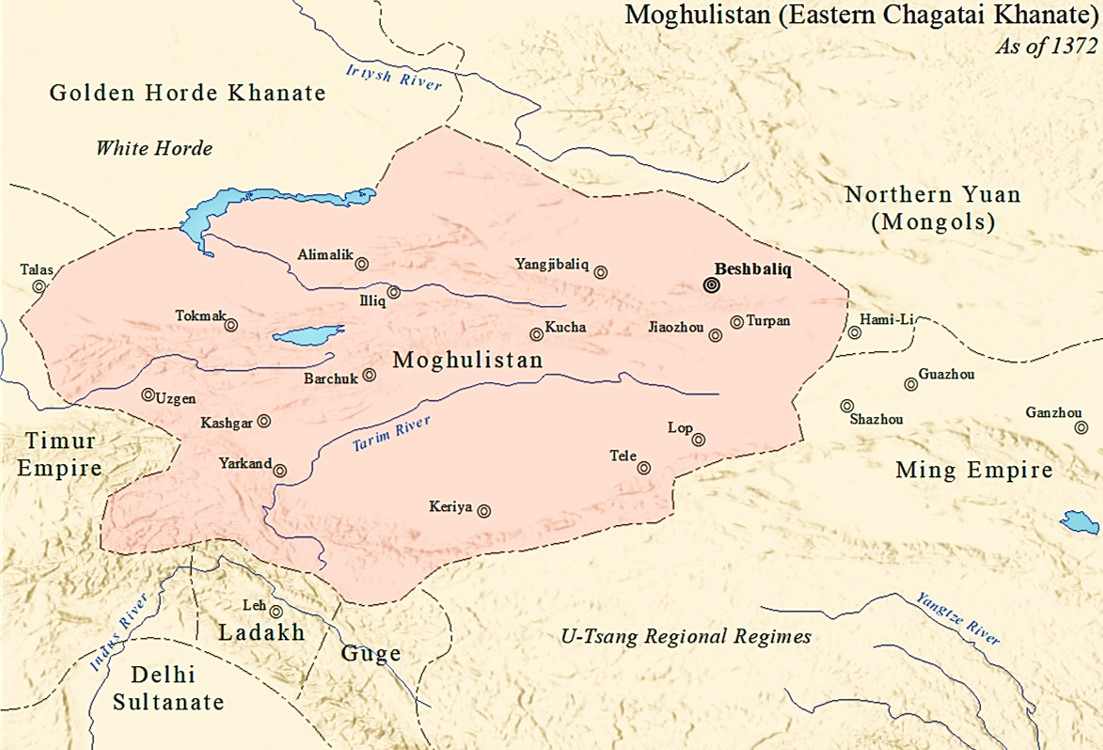
Moghulistan in 1372

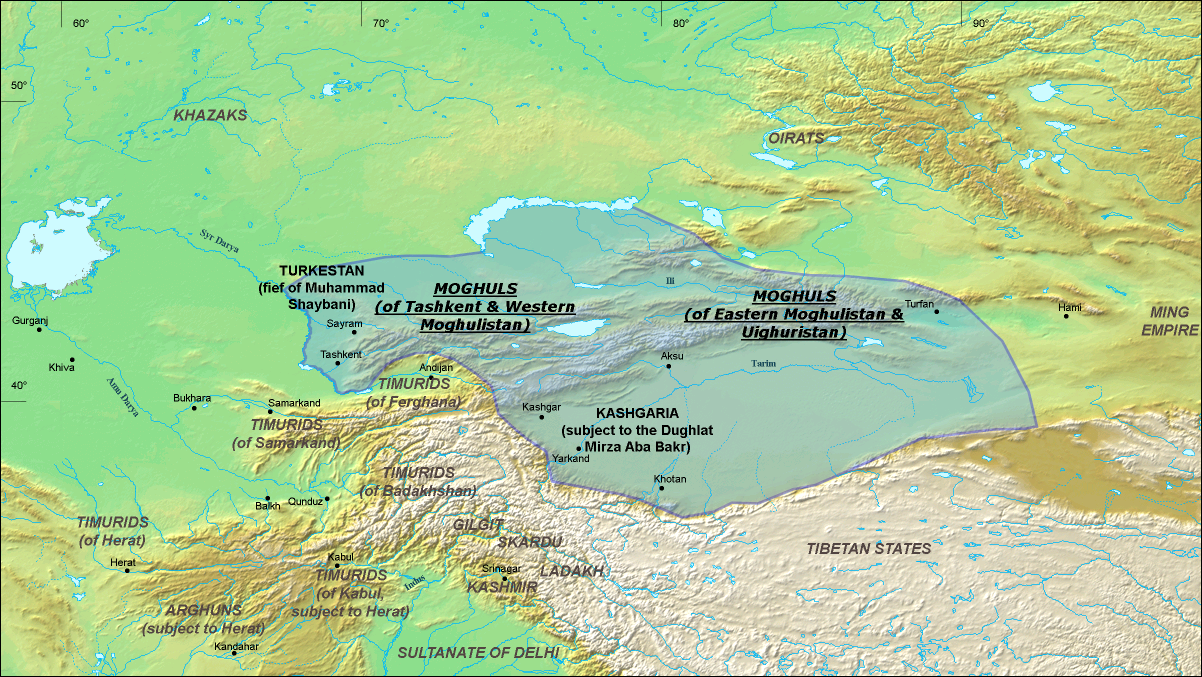
After the collapse of the Chagatai Khanate, 1490.

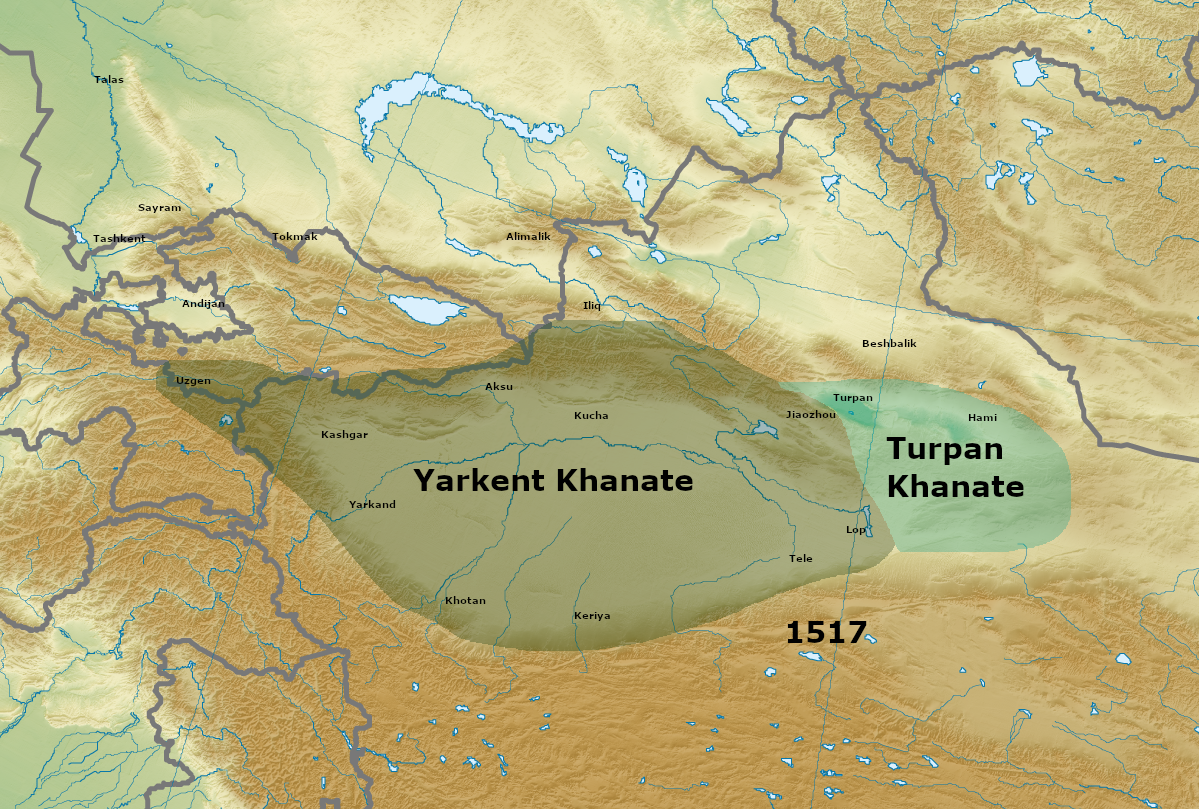
Yarkent Khanate and Turpan Khanate in 1517

This is a timeline of the Chagatai Khanate (1226–1348) and its successor states, Moghulistan (1347–1462), Yarkent Khanate (1514–1696), and the Turpan Khanate (1462–1680).

== 12th century ==
=== 1180s ===
Year	Date	Event
1183	22 December	Chagatai is born

== 13th century ==
=== 1200s ===
Year	Date	Event
1208		Qocho, Qayaligh, and Almaliq submit to Genghis Khan; Almaliq and the Issyk-Kul region given to Chagatai

=== 1210s ===
Year	Date	Event
1211		Mongol conquest of the Jin dynasty: Jochi, Ögedei, and Chagatai invade Inner Mongolia
1213	autumn	Mongol conquest of the Jin dynasty: Jochi, Ögedei, and Chagatai ravage Hebei and Shanxi
1219	fall	Mongol conquest of Khwarezmia: Ögedei and Chagatai take Otrar and massacres its population; Genghis Khan dispatches Jochi to conquer Syr Darya and another army to conquer Fergana
1219		Chagatai oversees the road construction for the Mongol Empire

=== 1220s ===
Year	Date	Event
1220		Mongol conquest of Khwarezmia: Genghis Khan takes Bukhara and Samarkand (given to Chagatai along with Jimsar County) and Muhammad II of Khwarezm flees to Nishapur; Genghis Khan dispatches Jebe and Subutai to destroy the sultan
1221	April	Mongol conquest of Khwarezmia: Jochi, Chagatai, and Ögedei destroy Urgench while Tolui takes Nishapur and Herat
1221		Siege of Bamyan: Genghis Khan takes Bamyan; Chagatai's son Mutukan dies in the process
1227		Mongol conquest of Western Xia: Chagatai takes Taiyuan and gains the advisors Vajir the Uyghur and Qutb-ud-Din Habash 'Amid
1229		Chagatai supports Ögedei's enthronement and is granted Transoxiana

=== 1240s ===
Year	Date	Event
1242	1 July	Chagatai Khan dies and his grandson Qara Hülegü succeeds him
1246		Güyük Khan appoints Yesü Möngke as head of the Chagatai Khanate

=== 1250s ===
Year	Date	Event
1251		Möngke Khan appoints Qara Hülegü as head of the Chagatai Khanate, who dies soon after, and his wife Orghana becomes regent for her young son Mubarak Shah

=== 1260s ===
Year	Date	Event
1260		Toluid Civil War: Alghu, a grandson of Chagatai Khan, deposes Mubarak Shah, an appointee to the Chagatai Khanate of the Mongol Empire, and sets up court in Kashgar while attacking Otrar and Afghanistan
1262		Toluid Civil War: Alghu betrays Ariq Böke and allies with Kublai Khan
1266		Alghu dies and is succeeded by Mubarak Shah, who is deposed by Ghiyas-ud-din Baraq
1269		Ghiyas-ud-din Baraq is defeated by the Golden Horde and loses a third of Transoxiana

=== 1270s ===
Year	Date	Event
1270		Ghiyas-ud-din Baraq of the Chagatai Khanate invades the Ilkhanate but suffers defeat at the battle of Qara-Su near Herat
1271		Ghiyas-ud-din Baraq dies and Kaidu takes control of the Chagatai Khanate, installing Negübei as puppet khan
1275		Chagatai Khanate gains Ghazni
1276		Chagatai Khanate secures control of Almaliq

=== 1280s ===
Year	Date	Event
1282		Kaidu enthrones Duwa as khan of the Chagatai Khanate
1286		Chagatai Khanate secures control of the Tarim Basin

=== 1290s ===
Year	Date	Event
1291		Chagatai Khanate raids Ilkhanate
1292		Chagatai Khanate raids India
1295		Chagatai Khanate secures control of Turpan and Hami
1298	winter	Kaidu–Kublai war: Duwa of the Chagatai Khanate defeats Yuan forces in Mongolia and captures Temür Khan's son in law, Körgüz

== 14th century ==
=== 1300s ===
Year	Date	Event
1301	September	Kaidu–Kublai war: Duwa and Kaidu suffer injuries in battle with Yuan forces east of the Altai Mountains and Kaidu dies soon after
1304		Temür Khan, Chapar Khan of the House of Ögedei, and Duwa of the Chagatai Khanate send envoys to the Ilkhanate to establish peace and restore unity among Mongols; Chagatai Khanate becomes a Yuan tributary
1306		Temür Khan sends Külüg Khan to aid Duwa in his war against Chapar Khan
1307		Chapar Khan is defeated and Duwa installs his brother Yangichar as puppet
1307		Duwa dies and his son Könchek succeeds him
1308		Könchek dies and Taliqu, a Muslim grandson of Büri, succeeds him
1309		Kebek, son of Duwa, murders Taliqu and enthrones his brother Esen Buqa I

=== 1310s ===
Year	Date	Event
1312		Ilkhanate seizes Ghazni
1316		Esen Buqa–Ayurbarwada war: Conflict breaks out between the Chagatai Khanate and the Yuan dynasty and Ilkhanate
1318		Esen Buqa–Ayurbarwada war: Esen Buqa I dies and Kebek succeeds him

=== 1320s ===
Year	Date	Event
1326		Kebek dies and his brother Eljigidey succeeds him
1328		Chagatai Khanate invades India, reaching as far as Delhi

=== 1330s ===
Year	Date	Event
1330		Eljigidey is deposed by his brother Duwa Temür
1331		Duwa Temür is deposed by his brother Tarmashirin, who converts to Islam
1334		Rebels discontent with the conversion to Islam kill Tarmashirin, who is succeeded by Buzan, his nephew
1335		Buzan is overthrown by his cousin Changshi
1338		Changshi is murdered by his brother Yesun Temur, who succeeds him
1338		Black Death strikes the Chagatai Khanate

=== 1340s ===
Year	Date	Event
1342		Yesun Temur is deposed by 'Ali-Sultan
1347		Qazan Khan ibn Yasaur is defeated by Qazaghan, who sets up Danishmandchi, an Ögedeiid prince, as puppet khan; effective end of the united Chagatai Khanate
1347		The Chagatai Khanate is split in two, with Qazaghan taking control of the western portion (Transoxania) and Tughlugh Timur the eastern portion (Moghulistan)
1348		Transoxania: Danishmandchi is killed by Qazaghan, who enthrones Bayan Qulï as khan

=== 1350s ===
Year	Date	Event
1350		Moghulistan: Tughlugh Timur gets circumsized and becomes a Muslim
1351		Transoxania: Qazaghan attacks the Kart dynasty and sacks Herat
1357		Transoxania: Qazaghan is assassinated and his son Abdullah succeeds him
1358		Transoxania: Abdullah had Bayan Qulï killed, angering Hajji Beg, Timur's uncle, the lord of Kesh, who drove him into exile and his death

=== 1360s ===
Year	Date	Event
1360	March	Moghulistan: Tughlugh Timur invades Transoxania and forces Hajji Beg to retreat to Khorasan; where he is assassinated at Shindand; Timur becomes head of the Barlas clan due to the death of Hajji Beg
1363		Transoxania: Amir Husayn and Timur invade and take Transoxania from Moghulistan; while fleeing Ilyas Khoja learns of his father Tughlugh Timur's death
1364		Transoxania: Amir Husayn and Timur enthrone Khabul Shah
1365		Moghulistan: Ilyas Khoja invades Transoxania and lays siege to Samarkand but is forced to retreat after his army is hit by an epidemic
1368		Moghulistan: Qamar-ud-din Khan Dughlat murders Ilyas Khoja and usurps the title of khan

=== 1370s ===
Year	Date	Event
1370	10 April	Transoxania: Timur proclaims himself Amir in Balkh after defeating Amir Husayn and enthrones Soyurgatmish as khan, killing Khabul Shah
1375		Transoxania: Timur invades Moghulistan, devastating the Ili region, to which Qamar-ud-din Khan Dughlat responds by invading Fergana and ambushing Timur, who barelly escapes

=== 1380s ===
Year	Date	Event
1388		Transoxania: Timur declares himself sultan and enthrones Sultan Mahmud as khan after Soyurgatmish dies
1389		Transoxania: Timur invades Moghulistan almost reaching Turpan and defeating Khizr Khoja

=== 1390s ===
Year	Date	Event
1390		Transoxania: Timur invades Moghulistan and drives Qamar-ud-din Khan Dughlat into hiding, enabling Khizr Khoja to gain control of the region
1397		Moghulistan: Khizr Khoja's daughter marries Timur
1399		Moghulistan: Khizr Khoja dies and his son Shams-i-Jahan succeeds him

== 15th century ==
=== 1400s ===
Year	Date	Event
1400		Transoxania: Timur sends his grandson Mirza Iskander to invade Moghulistan, seizing Aksu and Khotan
1402		Transoxania: Sultan Mahmud dies; effective end of the Western Chagatai Khanate
1408		Shams-i-Jahan is succeeded by his brother Muhammad Khan

=== 1410s ===
Year	Date	Event
1415		Muhammad Khan is succeeded by his brother Naqsh-i-Jahan
1418		Naqsh-i-Jahan is succeeded by Uwais Khan

=== 1420s ===
Year	Date	Event
1421		Uwais Khan is succeeded by Sher Muhammad
1425		Shah Rukh sends his son Ulugh Beg to invade Moghulistan and defeats Sher Muhammad; Uwais Khan becomes ruler of Moghulistan again
1429		Uwais Khan is killed by Satuq Khan; two factions supporting his sons Esen Buqa II and Yunus Khan go to war with Esen winning

=== 1430s ===
Year	Date	Event
1433		Moghulistan recovers Kashgar from the Timurid Empire

=== 1450s ===
Year	Date	Event
1451		Esen Buqa II raids the Timurid Empire; in response Abu Sa'id Mirza lends Yunus Khan troops to occupy Moghulistan near the Ili River, splitting the western portion into what would come to be known as the Yarkent Khanate

=== 1460s ===
Year	Date	Event
1462		Esen Buqa II dies and is succeeded by his son Dost Muhammad
1469		Dost Muhammad dies and is succeeded by his son Kebek Sultan

=== 1470s ===
Year	Date	Event
1472		Kebek Sultan is assassinated, leaving Yunus Khan sole ruler of Moghulistan
1473		Ming–Turpan conflict: Yunus Khan occupies Hami
1479		Mirza Abu Bakr Dughlat rebels and takes possession of Yarkand, defeating Yunus Khan twice

=== 1480s ===
Year	Date	Event
1482		Ming–Turpan conflict: Hami is retaken by Qanšin
1484		Taking advantage of the conflict between Umar Shaikh Mirza II and Sultan Ahmed Mirza, Yunus Khan occupies Fergana and Sayram
1484		Ahmad Alaq founds the Kyrgyz Khanate
1486		Yunus Khan dies and is succeeded by his sons Ahmad Alaq (Turpan Khanate) and Mahmud Khan (Yarkent Khanate)
1488		Yarkent Khanate: Mahmud Khan defeats a Timurid invasion
1488		Ming–Turpan conflict: Ahmad Alaq kills Qanšin and takes control of Hami
1489		Ming–Turpan conflict: Engke Bolad retakes Hami

=== 1490s ===
Year	Date	Event
1493		Ming–Turpan conflict: Ahmad Alaq captures Šamba and occupies Hami
1497		Ming–Turpan conflict: Ahmad Alaq abandons Hami
1499		Turpan Khanate: Ahmad Alaq seizes Kashgar and Yengisar from Mirza Abu Bakr Dughlat

== 16th century ==
=== 1500s ===
Year	Date	Event
1502		Muhammad Shaybani captures both Ahmad Alaq and Mahmud Khan in battle
1503		Turpan Khanate: Muhammad Shaybani releases the Moghul khans but Ahmad Alaq dies soon after and is succeeded by his son Mansur Khan
1508		Yarkent Khanate: Mahmud Khan is defeated by his nephew Sultan Said Khan, flees to Muhammad Shaybani, who executes him
1509		Mirza Abu Bakr Dughlat captures Kashgar

=== 1510s ===
Year	Date	Event
1513		Ming–Turpan conflict: Kara Del submits to Mansur Khan
1514		Yarkent Khanate: Sultan Said Khan overthrows Mirza Abu Bakr Dughlat and takes all of his territory, ruling it in his own right; so ends the unified Moghulistan
1517		Ming–Turpan conflict: Mansur Khan launches raids into the Ming dynasty

=== 1520s ===
Year	Date	Event
1529		Yarkent Khanate: Sultan Said Khan invades Badakhshan

=== 1530s ===
Year	Date	Event
1533		Yarkent Khanate: Sultan Said Khan dies while trying to invade Tibet and is succeeded by his son Abdurashid Khan - during his reign he loses the northern pastures to nomads

=== 1540s ===
Year	Date	Event
1543		Makhdum-i-Azam dies and his sons create the Aq Taghliq and Qara Taghliq religious orders
1545		Turpan Khanate: Mansur Khan is succeeded by his son Shah Khan

=== 1550s ===
Year	Date	Event
1558		Yarkent Khanate: Kazakh Khanate invades but is repelled

=== 1560s ===
Year	Date	Event
1565		Yarkent Khanate: Abdurashid Khan is succeeded by his son Abdul Karim Khan

=== 1570s ===
Year	Date	Event
1570		Turpan Khanate: Shah Khan dies and is succeeded by his brother Muhammad Khan ibn Mansur Khan; records don't mention much of the Turpan Khanate after this

=== 1590s ===
Year	Date	Event
1593		Yarkent Khanate: Abdul Karim Khan is succeeded by his brother Muhammad Sultan

== 17th century ==
=== 1610s ===
Year	Date	Event
1610		Yarkent Khanate: Muhammad Sultan is succeeded by his son Shudja ad Din Ahmad Khan
1619		Yarkent Khanate: Shudja ad Din Ahmad Khan is assassinated and succeeded by Abd al-Latif (Afak) Khan

=== 1630s ===
Year	Date	Event
1631		Yarkent Khanate: Abd al-Latif (Afak) Khan is succeeded by his nephew Sultan Ahmad Khan (Pulat Khan)
1636		Yarkent Khanate: Sultan Ahmad Khan (Pulat Khan) is overthrown by Abdallah (Moghul Khan)

=== 1650s ===
Year	Date	Event
1655		Yarkent Khanate: Yarkent becomes a tributary of the Qing dynasty

=== 1660s ===
Year	Date	Event
1667		Yarkent Khanate: Abdallah (Moghul Khan) is overthrown by his son, YuIbars Khan

=== 1670s ===
Year	Date	Event
1670		Yarkent Khanate: Yulbars Khan is overthrown and his uncle Ismail Khan is enthroned
1678		Dzungar conquest of Altishahr: Ismail Khan drives out to the Aq Taghliq Khoja Afaq Khoja, who seeks help from the 5th Dalai Lama, who in turn writes a letter to the Dzungar Khanate for help.

=== 1680s ===
Year	Date	Event
1680		Dzungar conquest of Altishahr: The Dzungars invade and kill Ismail's family. Abd ar-Rashid Khan II is installed as ruler.
1682		Riots break out, forcing Abd ar-Rashid Khan II to flee; his brother Muhammad Imin Khan succeeds him

=== 1690s ===
Year	Date	Event
1693		Muhammad Imin Khan invades the Dzungar Khanate but is overthrown by Afaq Khoja, whose son Yahiya Khoja is enthroned
1695		Afaq Khoja and Yahiya Khoja are killed in a rebellion
1696		Akbash Khan is enthroned but the begs of Kashgar refuse to acknowledge him. Dzungar troops are brought in by Akbash to enforce his rule. However the Dzungars install Mirza Alim Shah Beg; so ends the Yarkent Khanate and Chagatai rule

== See also ==
- Timeline of the Yuan dynasty
- Timeline of the Ilkhanate
- Timeline of the Golden Horde
- Timeline of Mongolian history
- Timeline of Mongols prior to the Mongol Empire

== Bibliography ==
- Adle, Chahryar (2003), History of Civilizations of Central Asia 5
- Andrade, Tonio (2016), The Gunpowder Age: China, Military Innovation, and the Rise of the West in World History, Princeton University Press, ISBN 978-0-691-13597-7.
- Asimov, M.S. (1998), History of civilizations of Central Asia Volume IV The age of achievement: A.D. 750 to the end of the fifteenth century Part One The historical, social and economic setting, UNESCO Publishing
- Atwood, Christopher P. (2004), Encyclopedia of Mongolia and the Mongol Empire, Facts On File
- Barfield, Thomas (1989), The Perilous Frontier: Nomadic Empires and China, Basil Blackwell
- Barrett, Timothy Hugh (2008), The Woman Who Discovered Printing, Great Britain: Yale University Press, ISBN 978-0-300-12728-7 (alk. paper)
- Beckwith, Christopher I. (2009), Empires of the Silk Road: A History of Central Eurasia from the Bronze Age to the Present, Princeton University Press, ISBN 978-0-691-13589-2
- Beckwith, Christopher I (1987), The Tibetan Empire in Central Asia: A History of the Struggle for Great Power among Tibetans, Turks, Arabs, and Chinese during the Early Middle Ages, Princeton University Press
- Biran, Michal (2005), The Empire of the Qara Khitai in Eurasian History: Between China and the Islamic World, Cambridge Studies in Islamic Civilization, Cambridge, England: Cambridge University Press, ISBN 0521842263
- Bregel, Yuri (2003), An Historical Atlas of Central Asia, Brill
- Drompp, Michael Robert (2005), Tang China And The Collapse Of The Uighur Empire: A Documentary History, Brill
- Ebrey, Patricia Buckley (1999), The Cambridge Illustrated History of China, Cambridge: Cambridge University Press, ISBN 0-521-66991-X (paperback).
- Ebrey, Patricia Buckley; Walthall, Anne; Palais, James B. (2006), East Asia: A Cultural, Social, and Political History, Boston: Houghton Mifflin, ISBN 0-618-13384-4
- Golden, Peter B. (1992), An Introduction to the History of the Turkic Peoples: Ethnogenesis and State-Formation in Medieval and Early Modern Eurasia and the Middle East, OTTO HARRASSOWITZ · WIESBADEN
- Graff, David A. (2002), Medieval Chinese Warfare, 300-900, Warfare and History, London: Routledge, ISBN 0415239559
- Graff, David Andrew (2016), The Eurasian Way of War Military Practice in Seventh-Century China and Byzantium, Routledge, ISBN 978-0-415-46034-7.
- Grousset, Rene (1970), Empire of the Steppes
- Haywood, John (1998), Historical Atlas of the Medieval World, AD 600-1492, Barnes & Noble
- Latourette, Kenneth Scott (1964), The Chinese, their history and culture, Volumes 1-2, Macmillan
- Lorge, Peter A. (2008), The Asian Military Revolution: from Gunpowder to the Bomb, Cambridge University Press, ISBN 978-0-521-60954-8
- Luttwak, Edward N. (2009), The Grand Strategy of the Byzantine Empire, The Belknap Press of Harvard University Press
- Millward, James (2009), Eurasian Crossroads: A History of Xinjiang, Columbia University Press
- Mote, F. W. (2003), Imperial China: 900–1800, Harvard University Press, ISBN 978-0674012127
- Needham, Joseph (1986), Science & Civilisation in China, vol. V:7: The Gunpowder Epic, Cambridge University Press, ISBN 0-521-30358-3
- Rong, Xinjiang (2013), Eighteen Lectures on Dunhuang, Brill
- Schafer, Edward H. (1985), The Golden Peaches of Samarkand: A study of T'ang Exotics, University of California Press
- Shaban, M. A. (1979), The ʿAbbāsid Revolution, Cambridge: Cambridge University Press, ISBN 0-521-29534-3
- Sinor, Denis (1990), The Cambridge History of Early Inner Asia, Volume 1, Cambridge University Press
- Sima, Guang (2015), Bóyángbǎn Zīzhìtōngjiàn 54 huánghòu shīzōng 柏楊版資治通鑑54皇后失蹤, Yuǎnliú chūbǎnshìyè gǔfèn yǒuxiàn gōngsī, ISBN 978-957-32-0876-1
- Skaff, Jonathan Karam (2012), Sui-Tang China and Its Turko-Mongol Neighbors: Culture, Power, and Connections, 580-800 (Oxford Studies in Early Empires), Oxford University Press
- Standen, Naomi (2007), Unbounded Loyalty Frontier Crossings in Liao China, University of Hawai'i Press
- Steinhardt, Nancy Shatzman (1997), Liao Architecture, University of Hawaii Press
- Twitchett, Denis C. (1979), The Cambridge History of China, Vol. 3, Sui and T'ang China, 589–906, Cambridge University Press
- Twitchett, Denis (1994), "The Liao", The Cambridge History of China, Volume 6, Alien Regime and Border States, 907-1368, Cambridge: Cambridge University Press, pp. 43–153, ISBN 0521243319
- Twitchett, Denis (2009), The Cambridge History of China Volume 5 The Sung dynasty and its Predecessors, 907-1279, Cambridge University Press
- Wang, Zhenping (2013), Tang China in Multi-Polar Asia: A History of Diplomacy and War, University of Hawaii Press
- Wilkinson, Endymion (2015). Chinese History: A New Manual, 4th edition. Cambridge, MA: Harvard University Asia Center distributed by Harvard University Press. ISBN 9780674088467.
- Xiong, Victor Cunrui (2000), Sui-Tang Chang'an: A Study in the Urban History of Late Medieval China (Michigan Monographs in Chinese Studies), U OF M CENTER FOR CHINESE STUDIES, ISBN 0892641371
- Xiong, Victor Cunrui (2009), Historical Dictionary of Medieval China, United States of America: Scarecrow Press, Inc., ISBN 978-0810860537
- Xu, Elina-Qian (2005), HISTORICAL DEVELOPMENT OF THE PRE-DYNASTIC KHITAN, Institute for Asian and African Studies 7
- Xue, Zongzheng (1992), Turkic peoples, 中国社会科学出版社
- Yuan, Shu (2001), Bóyángbǎn Tōngjiàn jìshìběnmò 28 dìèrcìhuànguánshídài 柏楊版通鑑記事本末28第二次宦官時代, Yuǎnliú chūbǎnshìyè gǔfèn yǒuxiàn gōngsī, ISBN 957-32-4273-7
- Yule, Henry (1915), Cathay and the Way Thither: Being a Collection of Medieval Notices of China, Vol I: Preliminary Essay on the Intercourse Between China and the Western Nations Previous to the Discovery of the Cape Route, Hakluyt Society
