= List of Chagatai khans =

Khan of the Chagatai Khanate
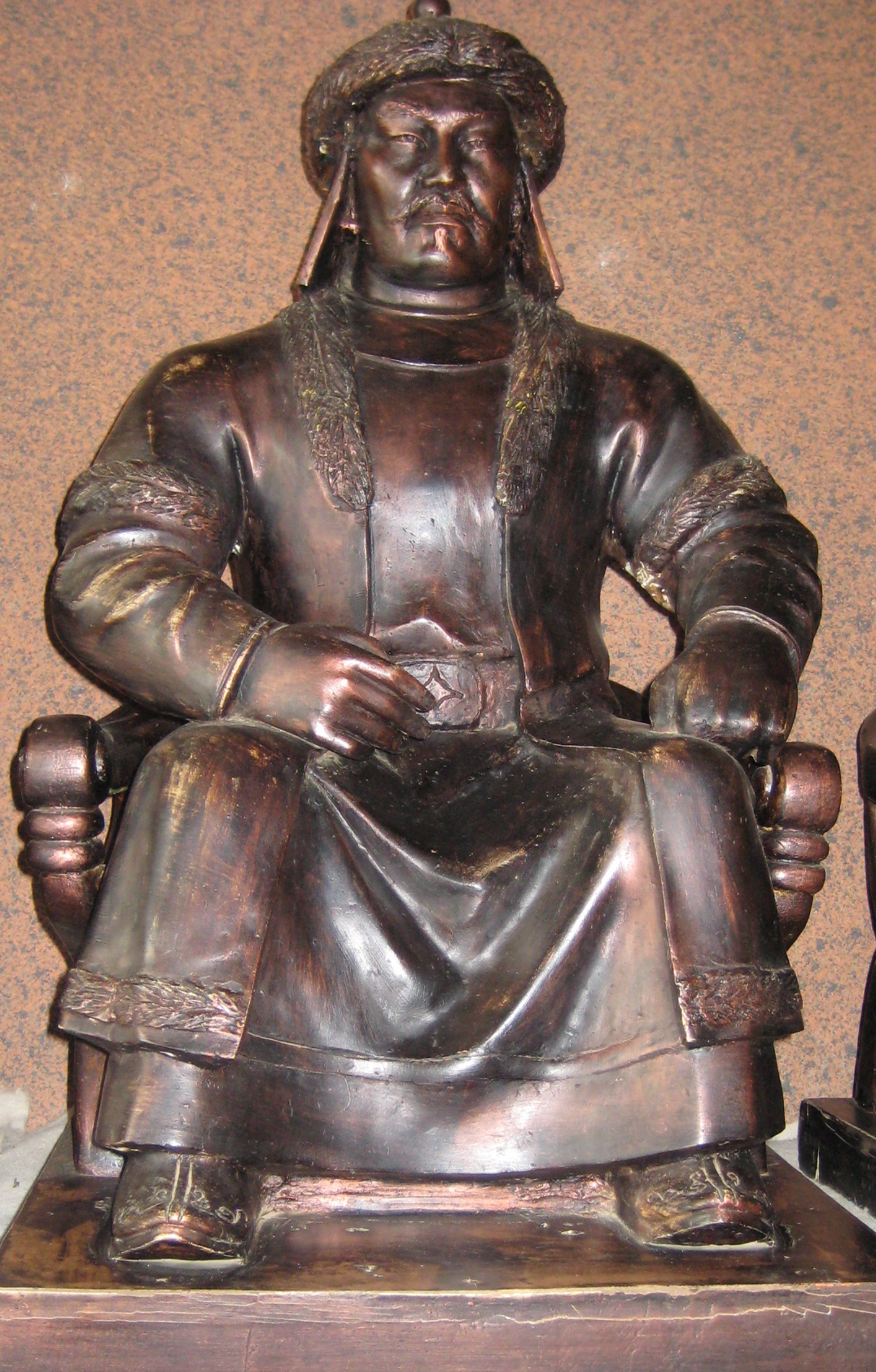
- Statue of Chagatai Khan

Details
- First monarch: Chagatai Khan
- Last monarch: Maqsud Khan
- Formed: 18th August 1227
- Abolished: 6th June 1930
- Appointer: Kurultai

This is a list of Chagatai khans, who reigned as monarchs of the Chagatai Khanate from Chagatai Khan's inheritance of the state in 1227 to their removal from power by the Dzungars and their vassals in 1687. The power of the Chagatai Khans varied; from its beginning, the khanate was one of the weakest of the Mongol states and often its rulers were merely figureheads for ambitious conquerors (see Kaidu and Timur).

Note: The following list is incomplete. It excludes several collateral lines that ruled over minor territories and were relatively unimportant.

== Khans of the Chagatai Khanate ==
Personal Name	Reign	Religion
Chagatai Khan چغتائی خان	1226–1242 CE	Tengrism
Qara Hülëgü قارا ہلاکو	1242–1246 CE 1st Reign	Tengrism
Yesü Möngke یہسو مونکو	1246–1252 CE	Tengrism
Qara Hülëgü قارا ہلاکو	1252 CE 2nd Reign	Tengrism
Mubarak Shah مبارک شاہ; His mother Orqina Khatun was regent during this time	1252–1260 CE 1st Reign	Islam
Alghu bin Baidar الغو	1260–1266 CE	Tengrism
Mubarak Shah مبارک شاہ	1266 CE 2nd Reign	Islam
Ghiyas-ud-din Baraq غیاث الدین باراق	1266–1270 CE	Islam
Kaidu bin Kashin and his son Chapar bin Kaidu ruled as de facto Khans from 1270 until 1304. The Chagatai Khans during this period were appointed by them but still rebelled when they tried to exert their authority.
Negübei نہگوبائی; Under Kaidu bin Kashin	1270–1272 CE	Tengrism
Buqa Temür بغا تیمور بن قداقچی; Under Kaidu bin Kashin	127?–1282 CE	Tengrism
Duwa دووا; Under Kaidu bin Kashin & Chapar bin Kaidu	1282–1306 CE	Tengrism
Restoration of Chagatai Khanate independence.
Duwa دووا	1306–1307 CE	Tengrism
Könchek کونچہک	1307–1308 CE	Tengrism
Taliqu تالقو بن قداقچی	1308–1309 CE	Islam
Kebek قبق بن دووا	1309–1310 CE 1st Reign	Tengrism
Esen Buqa I ایشان بغا	1310–1318 CE	Tengrism
Kebek قبق بن دووا	1318–1325 CE 2nd Reign	Tengrism
Eljigidey ?	1325–1329 CE	Tengrism
Duwa Temür دووا تیمور	1329–1330 CE	Tengrism
Ala-ad-din Tarmashirin علاء الدین تارماشیریں	1331–1334 CE	Islam
Buzan بوزان	1334–1335 CE	Tengrism
Changshi چانگشی	1335–1338 CE	Tengrism
Yesun Temur یسون تیمور	1338–1342 CE	Tengrism
Ali Sultan علی سلطان	1342 CE	Islam
Muhammad I ibn Pulad محمد ابن پلاد	1342–1343 CE	Islam
Qazan Khan ibn Yasaur غازان خان	1343–1346 CE	Islam
Qazan's death signified the end of the effective power of the Chagatai khans within the ulus; subsequent khans were rulers in name only. Qazaghan took the title of Amir and to legitimize himself conferred the title of khan on descendants of Genghis Khan of his own choosing.
Danishmandchi دانشمندجی; Under Qazaghan	1346–1348 CE	Islam
During Qazaghan's reign the Chagatai Khanate devolved into a loose confederation of tribes. This resulted in the Division of the Empire in 1347 CE into the Western Chagatai Khanate and Eastern part known as Moghulistan under Tughlugh Timur.

- Blue rows signifies nominal rule.

== Khans of the Western Chagatai Khanate and the Eastern Chagatai Khanate (Moghulistan) ==
Western Chagatai Khanate	Moghulistan
Bayan Qulï بیان قلی; Under Qazaghan & Abdullah bin Qazaghan; 1348–1358 CE	Tughlugh Timur تغلق تیمور; 1347–1360 CE
Shah Temur شاہ تیمور; Under Abdullah bin Qazaghan; 1358 CE	
Tughlugh Timur تغلق تیمور (Tribes of Chagatai Khanate rebelled against Abdullah bin Qazaghan who was of the Qara'unas forcing him to retreat but the coalition of Suldus under Buyan Suldus and Barlas under Hajji Beg collapsed; anarchy reigned in Chagatai Khanate. This power vacuum allowed Tughlugh Timur to move in without much resistance only Hajji Beg who was defiant had to make his escape. Tughlugh Timur then appointed Timur Gurkani as Chief of Barlas tribe and returned to his capital. However he was back in the region next year with the view of removing most Amirs and to consolidate his grip on his new conquered territory. He executed several amirs, including Amir Bayazid and Buyan Suldus. The son of Abdullah bin Qazaghan named Amir Husayn was the new Chief of the Qara'unas and resisted the powerful King of Moghulistan but was also defeated, however he would return after the king's death.Tughlugh Timur before leaving for his capital left his son Ilyas Khoja as viceroy of Chagatai Khanate region. The ruthlessness with which the Moghuls ruled the region caused many to oppose them, including Amir Husayn of the Qara'unas and Timur of the Barlas. Together they faced an army of Moghuls and local tribes loyal to Ilyas Khoja, and defeated them. Shortly afterwards, Tughlugh Timur died and Ilyas Khoja left for Moghulistan to take power. The tribes nominated and placed Adil-Sultan as nominal Khan of Chagatai Khanate. 1361–1363 CE
Adil-Sultan عادل سلطان; Under Tribal Confederation of Amir Husayn and Amir Timur; 1363 CE	Ilyas Khoja الیاس خوجہ; 1363–1368 CE
Khabul Shah خابول شاہ; Under Amir Husayn; 1364–1370 CE	Qamar-ud-din Khan Dughlat قمر الدین خان دغلت; Usurper; 1368–1392 CE
Soyurgatmish Under Amir Timur; 1370–1388 CE	
Sultan Mahmud Khan سلطان محمود خان; Under Amir Timur. Sultan Mahmud's death in 1402 marked the effective end of the line of Chagatai Khans in Transoxiana, who had long been mere figureheads and the rise of Timurid dynasty. 1388–1403 CE	Khizr Khoja خضر خوجہ; 1389–1399

- Transoxiana remained in the hands of Timur and his successors. For a continued list of rulers of Moghulistan see below.

== Khans of Moghulistan ==
Titular Name(s)	Personal Name	Reign
Khan خان	Tughlugh Timur تغلق تیمور	1348–1363 CE
Khan خان	Ilyas Khoja الیاس خوجہ	1363–1368 CE
Khan خان	Qamar-ud-din Khan Dughlat قمر الدین خان دغلت	1368–1392 CE
Khan خان	Khizr Khoja خضر خوجہ	1389–1399 CE
Khan خان	Shams-i-Jahan شمس جہان	1399–1408 CE
Khan خان	Muhammad Khan محمد خان	1408–1415 CE
Khan خان	Naqsh-i-Jahan نقش جہان	1415–1418 CE
Khan خان	Uwais Khan اویس خان	1418–1421 CE; 1st reign
Khan خان	Sher Muhammad شیر محمد	1421–1425 CE
Khan خان	Uwais Khan اویس خان	1425–1429 CE; 2nd reign
Khan خان	Satuq Khan ستوق خان	1429–1434 CE
Khan خان	Esen Buqa II ایشان بغا ثانی	1429–1462 CE
Division of Moghulistan into Western Moghulistan (Yarkent) and Eastern Moghulistan (Turpan)

- Green shaded row signifies rule of usurper.

== Khans of Western Moghulistan (Yarkent) and Khans of Eastern Moghulistan (Turpan) ==
Western Moghulistan (Yarkent Khanate)	Eastern Moghulistan (Turpan Khanate)
Yunus Khan یونس خان; 1462–1469 CE	Dost Muhammad Khan دوست محمد خان; 1462–1468 CE
	Kebek Sultan Oghlan قبق سلطان; 1469 CE
Yunus Khan یونس خان; 1469–1487 CE
Mahmud Khan محمود خان; 1487–1508 CE	Ahmad Alaq احمد الاچ; 1487–1503 CE
	Mansur Khan منصور خان; 1503–1508 CE
Mansur Khan منصور خان; 1508–1514 CE
Sultan Sa'id Khan سلطان سعید خان; 1514–1533 CE	Mansur Khan منصور خان; 1514–1543 CE
Abdurashid Khan عبد الرشید خان; 1533–1560 CE	Shah Khan شاہ خان; 1543–1570 CE
Abdul Karim Khan (Yarkand) عبد الکریم خان; 1560–1591 CE; Muhammad Sultan (Yarkand) محمد سلطان; 1592-1609 CE; Shudja ad Din Ahmad Khan (Yarkand) شجاع الدین احمد خان; 1609-1618 CE	Abul Muhammad Khan (Turpan) ابوالمحمد خان; 1570 CE; Sufi Khan (Turpan) خان صُوفِيّ 1570 CE
Sultan Sa'id Khan after defeating Mirza Abu Bakr Dughlat established the Altishaher or union of 6 cities, a much reduced western half of Moghulistan. By this time the western half was referred to as Kashgaria and eastern half was referred to as Uyghurstan. During the reign of Abdurashid Khan a certain Naqshbandi Sufi teacher Ahmad Kasani (1462–1542), known as Makhdum-i-Azam (the Great Master) came to Kashgar from Samarkand. His descendants, known as Makhdum Zadas and bearing title "Khoja", would play an important role in the history of the region from the 16th to 19th centuries. Makhdum's eldest son Muhammad Amin, known also as Khoja Kalon (d.1598) became the founder of Sufi order (tariqa) Ishkiyya of Nakshbandi Khojagan, his son Muhammad Yūsuf (d.1653) settled himself in Kashgar and was granted village of Bashkerim near Kashgar by Abdullah Khan in 1638. His son Khoja Hidayatullah better known as Afaq Khoja and his followers became known as the Aq Taghliks, those of the "White Mountains", because of their close approximation to Tangri Tagh (Tian Shan). Makhdum's second son, Muhammad Ishaq Wali (d.1599 in the age of 94), founder of Ishaqiya Sufi order of Nakshbandi Khojagan, with his followers established themselves in Yarkand and became known as the Qara Taghliks, those of the "Black Mountains", because of their close approximation to the Pamir, Karakoram and Kunlun. The Kashgaria region gradually devolved into small city states with the Khojas as rivals post 1570 CE

== Said Khan successors (Yarkent Khanate) ==
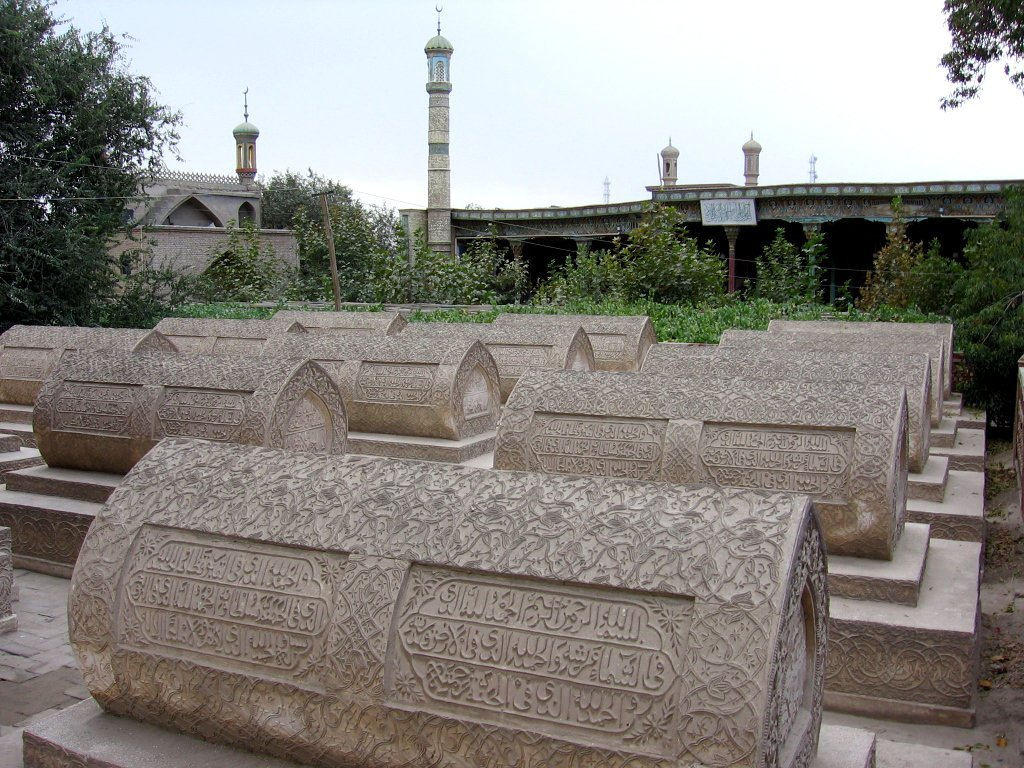
Tombs of Moghul Khans of Yarkand Khanate in royal cemetery Altyn in Yarkand

- Abdurashid Khan (in Aksu 1521–1533) 1533–1560, son of Sultan Said Khan
- Abdul Karim Khan (Yarkand) 1560–1591, eldest son of Abdurashid Khan
- Muhammad Khan (in Turfan 1588–1591) 1591–1610, 5th son of Abdurashid Khan, in 1603 was visited in Yarkand by Portuguese Jesuit Bento de Gois, who was searching land ways from India to Ming China, headed trade mission on behalf of Moghul Emperor of India Akbar the Great and had a Letter of Safe Conduct, granted by Akbar and addressed to Muhammad Khan, with him.
- Shudja ad Din Ahmad Khan 1610–1618, son of Muhammad Khan, grandson of Abdurashid Khan, was killed in 1618 during hunting
- Kuraysh Sultan 1618, son of Yunus Sultan, grandson of Abdurashid Khan, ruled only 9 days before he was killed
- Abd al-Latif (Afak) Khan 1618–1630, second son of Shudja ad-Din Ahmad Khan, who was only 13 when was set up on khanship, died in the age of 25
- Sultan Ahmad Khan (Pulat Khan) 1630–1633, first son of Timur Sultan, who was the first son of Shuja ad-Din Ahmad Khan and died in 1615
- Mahmud Sultan (Qilich Khan) 1633–1636, second son of Timur Sultan, died in the age of 22 when was poisoned in 1636 by Khoja Yahiya (died in 1646), son of Khoja Ishak, founder of Ishakiyya branch of Nakshbandi Khojagan Sufi Order, followers of which were known as Kara Taghliks.
- Sultan Ahmad Khan (Pulat Khan) 1636–1638, restored on khanship with help of Khoja Yahiya, who was granted village Guma near Khotan by Sultan Ahmad Khan, resigned in 1638 on demands of emirs in favor of Abdullah Khan, died in 1640 in the age of 27
- Abdullah Khan (in Turfan 1634/5–1638/9) 1638–1669, eldest son of Abduraim Khan, grandson of Abdurashid Khan, expelled to India in 1669, where he was received by Moghul Emperor Aurangzeb, who arranged his Hajj to Mecca, died in 1675 in the age of 67, buried in Agra
- Nur ad-Din Sultan ( in Aksu 1649–1667) 1667–1668 in Kashgar and Yengisar, youngest son of Abdullah Khan, died in 1668 in the age of 31, reigned one year with help of the Kara Yanchuks , mercenaries from Dzungars and Kyrgyz tribes, who were first recruited on service in Yarkand Khanate during last years of reigning of Abdullah Khan.
- Ismail Khan (in Chalish 1666–1669, in Aksu 1669–1670) 1669, 5th son of Abduraim Khan, grandson of Abdurashid Khan, disciple of Kara Taghlik leader Khoja Ubaidullah (Khoja Shadi), son of Khoja Yahiya, was declared a Khan in Aksu after Abdullah Khan fled to India.
- YuIbars Khan ( In Kashgar 1638–1667, since age of 8) 1669–1670, eldest son of Abdullah Khan, disciple of Ak Taghlik Khoja Mohammad Yusuf and his son Appak Khoja, during his reign positions of Ak Taghliks in Yarkand Khanate greatly increased, was killed in 1670 by Dzungar supporter Erka Bek in the age of 40
- Abd al Latif Sultan 1670, son of Yulbars Khan, who was set up on khanship by Ak Taghliks, was killed in the same 1670 by Kara Taghliks with all other sons of Yulbars Khan
- Ismail Khan 1670–1678, restored on 2 April 1670 by Kara Taghliks, expelled Appak Khoja and his son Yahia Khoja from the country in 1670, in 1678 captured by Dzungars, who were invited by Ak Taghlik leader Appak Khoja using recommendation letter from 5th Dalai Lama, died in Ili River Valley ( Baghistan) in 1680 in the age of 56.
- Abd ar-Rashid Khan II (in Turfan 1680–1682) 1678–1680, eldest son of Sultan Said Baba Khan, set up on khanship by Dzungar Galdan Boshugtu Khan, who came to Yarkand with Appak Khoja.
- Muhammad Imin Khan (Muhammad Amin Khan) (in Turfan 1682–1690) 1680–1681 in Chalish, second son of Sultan Said Baba Khan
- Appak Khoja 1680–1690, died in 1694, set up himself on khanship after expelling Abd ar-Rashid Khan II from Yarkand with help of Dzungars, expelled Kara Taghlik leader Khoja Daniyal into Kashmir.
- Muhammad Imin Khan (Muhammad Amin Khan) 1690–1692, was recalled from Turpan and elected a Khan on Kurultai of Kashgar and Yarkand Beks, was killed in 1692 after losing a battle with Appak Khoja near Kargalik
- Yahiya Khoja (in Kashgar 1690–1692) 1692–1695, son of Appak Khoja, set up on khanship by Appak Khoja, killed in 1695 by Hanim Pasha
- Hanim Pasha (Hanum Padshah) 1695, sister of Muhammad Imin Khan, widow of Appak Khoja, was killed in 1695
- Akbash Khan 1695–1705, youngest son of Sultan Said Baba Khan, great grandson of Abdurashid Khan, disciple of Kara Taghliks, recalled Kara Taghlik leader Khoja Daniyal (died in 1735) from exile to resist Ak Taghliks and Dzungars, fled to India in 1705

The remnants of the state fell to two different rival branches of Khojas- Ak Taghliks and Kara Taghliks. Aqtaghlyq branch of Khojas, a confederation under the influence of the Dzungars, took power in Kashgar where Ahmad Khoja, son of Yahiya Khoja, was declared a Khan. In Yarkand Kara Taghliks took power with Khoja Daniyal being declared a Khan, that caused civil war between Kashgar and Yarkand.
In 1713 remnant of Yarkant Khanate - Altishar ( union of 6 cities)-became dependency of Dzungar Khanate under Tsewang Rabtan, paying annual tribute from all 6 cities in amount of one silver tanga from soul, for Yarkand it was established in amount of 100,000 silver tangas, for Kashgar-67,000 silver tangas, this time Kara Taghliks were established by Dzungars to be responsible for collecting tribute. In 1752 Altishar restored its independence after revolt against Dzungar Khanate under leadership of Kara Taghlik leader Khoja Yusup, son of Khoja Daniyal. In 1755 sons of Ahmad Khoja and great grandsons of Appak Khoja, Ak Taghliks Burhan ad-Din Khoja and Jahan Khoja were rescued by Qings troops in Ili River Valley from Dzungar's captivity and sent to Altishar to claim mandate of Qing China for the country. In ensuing bloody war with Kara Taghliks brothers emerged victorious and established total control of Altishar in 1756 but refused to submit to Qings after that. In 1759 Altishar was conquered by Qing China, that created province Nanlu (Southern Road) on its territory in 1760, while province Beilu (Northern Road) was created on the territory of former Dzungar Khanate, that was exterminated by Qing China in 1756.

== Mansur Khan successors (Turpan Khanate) ==
The following successors to Mansur Khan possessed the titles of Little Khans sitting in Turpan, contrary to the Great Khans sitting in Yarkand.

- Shah Khan 1543–1570, eldest son of Mansur Khan
- Muhammad Khan ibn Mansur Khan, 1570
- Koraish Sultan (Khotan 1533–1588; Chalish 1570–88) 1570–1588, son of Abdurashid Khan, expelled to India in 1588 by Abdul Karim Khan, where he was received by Moghul Emperor Akbar the Great, who gave him one of regions of India in suyurgal.
- Muhammad Khan (in Kashgaria 1591–1610), 1588–1591, son of Abdurashid Khan
- Abduraim Khan 1591–1636, youngest son of Abdurashid Khan
- Muhammad Khashim Sultan (in Chalish) 1608–1610, son of Khudabende Sultan, who was son of Koraish Sultan
- Abdullah Khan (in Chalish, in Kashgaria 1638–1669) 1636–1638, eldest son of Abduraim Khan
- Abu'l Muhammad Khan 1636–1653, son of Abduraim Khan
- Sultan Said Baba Khan ( in Kumul 1636–1653) 1653, died in 1680 in the age of 53, 4th son of Abduraim Khan
- Ibrahim Sultan ( in Khotan 1638–1653) 1653–1655, son of Abduraim Khan, was killed in 1655
- Sultan Said Baba Khan (restored) 1655–1680
- Abd ar-Rashid Khan II (in Chalish 1678–1680) 1680–1682, eldest son of Sultan Said Baba Khan, died in 1694
- Muhammad Imin Khan (Muhammad Amin Khan) 1682–1690, second son of Sultan Said Baba Khan, great grandson of Abdurashid Khan

Annexed by the Dzungars. After exterminating of Dzungar Khanate by Qing China in 1756, remnants of Dynasty survived in semi-autonomous Kumul Khanate till the 20th century, last ruler of which Maqsud Shah died in 1930.

== Genealogy of Ulus of Chaghatay ==
House of Borjigin

Mongol Empire
Chaghatay Khanate
Western Chaghatay Khanate
Eastern Chaghatay Khanate
Anding Guard
Hami Guard
Turpan Khanate
Yarkent Khanate

Temüjin r. 1206–1227
Chaghatay r. 1225–1242	Ögeday r. 1229–1241
Mutukan	Sarban	Yisu-Möngke r. 1246–1252	Baydar	Qadan	Malik
Buri	Yisuntuwa	Qara-Hulagu r. 1242–1246, 1252–1252	Negubay r. 1271–1271	Alghu r. 1260–1266	Jebe	Turjan
Qadaqchi	Baraq r. 1266–1271	Mubarak-Shah r. 1252–1260, 1266–1266	Chubay	Isan-Timur	Khundun
Buqa-Timur r. 1271–1272	Taliqu r. 1309–1309	Duwa r. 1272–1307	Num-Quli	Iliqchi	Kurasba	Danishmandchi r. 1346–1348
Örüg-Timur	Kunchek r. 1307–1309	Isan-Buqa I r. 1310–1319	Kebek I r. 1309–1310, 1319–1326	Ilchikday r. 1326–1329	Dura-Timur r. 1329–1330	Tarma-Shirin r. 1330–1334	Ibugan	Surghatu	Imil-Khwaja	Bayan-Timur r. 1375–1377	Bayan-Quli	Ali-Sultan r. 1340–1342	Suyurghatmish r. 1370–1384
Yasawur	Pulad	Dorji	Buzan r. 1334–1335	Changshi r. 1335–1338	Yisun-Timur r. 1338–1340	Bayan-Quli r. 1348–1358	Tughluq-Timur r. 1346–1360 r. 1360–1363	Sarjishqa	Num-Quli	Sultan-Mahmud r. 1384–1402
Ghazan-Sultan r. 1343–1346	Muhammad I r. 1342–1343	Khabul-Shah r. 1363–1370	Shah-Timur r. 1358–1359	Ilyas-Khwaja r. 1363–1368	Khidr-Khwaja r. 1389–1402	Ipandan r. 1413–1446	Kana-Shirin r. 1380–1393	Anka-Timur r. 1393–1405	Ibn Num-Quli
Adil-Sultan r. 1363–1363	Shams-Jahan r. 1402–1408	Muhammad II r. 1408–1415	Shir-Ali	Shir-Muhammad r. 1418–1420	Rinjan-Qansar r. 1446–1490	Tuqta r. 1405–1411	Mangli-Timur r. 1411–1425
Naqsh-Jahan r. 1415–1418	Uways I r. 1418–1418, 1420–1429	Kambun r. 1490–1513	Ibn Rinjan-Qansar	Buda-Shirin r. 1436–1439	Tughan-Timur r. 1427–1437
Yunus r. 1457–1487	Isan-Buqa II r. 1429–1462	Shamba r. 1492–1493, 1497–1505	Dawada-Shirin r. 1439–1457	Burqa r. 1457–1460	Tuqta-Timur r. 1437–1439
Mahmud r. 1487–1508	Ahmad r. 1487–1503	Dust-Muhammad r. 1462–1468	Ibn Isan-Buqa	Bayazid r. 1505–1513
Mansur r. 1503–1543	Sa'id r. 1514–1533	Ibn Ahmad	Kebek II r. 1468–1472	Uways II r. 1472–1487
Shah r. 1543–1565	Abdur-Rashid I r. 1533–1560	Mas'ud r. 1565–1570
Abdul-Karim r. 1560–1592	Muhammad r. 1592–1609	Yunus	Abdur-Rahim
Ahmad I r. 1609–1618	Quraysh r. 1618–1618	Abdullah r. 1639–1667	Isma'il r. 1667–1680	Baba
Timur	Abdul-Latif I r. 1618–1630	Yulbars r. 1667–1670	Abdur-Rashid II r. 1680–1682	Muhammad-Amin r. 1682–1692	Muhammad-Mu'min r. 1695–1700
Ahmad II r. 1630–1632, 1635–1639	Mahmud r. 1632–1635	Abdul-Latif II r. 1670–1670	Ahmad III r. 1700–1700
