= Nikudari =

Nikudari may refer to:

- Qara'unas or Neguderi, a Mongol group that settled in Afghanistan and eastern Persia.
- Negudar, a Mongol general under Berke, and a Golden Horde Noyan.

== See also ==
- Moghol people
- List of Hazara tribes
