= Qazan Khan =

Qazan or Ghazan is the name of:

- Ghazan Khan, the most famous Ilkhan of Mongol Persia
- Qazan Khan ibn Yasaur (died 1346), ruler of the Chagatai Khanate in 1343–1346
