= Danishmand =

Danishmand (from Classical Persian دانشمند dānishmand ‘wise’) may refer to:

- Ibrahim Danishmand, 16th-century Islamic scholar
- Danishmand Gazi, founder of the Danishmandid dynasty
- Danishmands, another name for the Danishmandid dynasty

== See also ==
- Danishmandchi
