= Uwais Khan =

Khan of Moghulistan
- 1st reign: 1418–1421
- Predecessor: Naqsh-i-Jahan
- Successor: Sher Muhammad
- 2nd reign: 1425–1429
- Predecessor: Sher Muhammad
- Successor: Satuq Khan
- Died: 1429
- Spouse: Daulat Sultan Sakanj
- Issue: Yunus Khan; Esen Buqa II; Daughter
- House: Borjigin
- Father: Sher Ali Oglan
- Mother: Sultan Khatun
- Religion: Islam

Uwais Khan ibn Sher Ali (Chagatai and Persian: اویس خان ابن شیر علی) also referred to as Sultan Vais Khan, was the Moghul Khan of Mughalistan; (first from 1418 to 1421 C.E. and again from 1425 to 1429 C.E.). He was the nephew of Sher Muhammad. In English, his name has been variously spelled and pronounced as either Awais, Owais or Vais.

== Early life ==
After the death of his father, he was in the service of his uncle, Sher Muhammad. After a time he began to find his condition irksome, and therefore fled from the court, and took to the life of a Kazaki (robber). Many distinguished Moghul youths volunteered to follow him. Among this number was Amir Sayyid Ali Dughlat (Great grandfather of Mirza Muhammad Haidar Dughlat). Amir Sayyid Ali Dughlat was the son of Sayyid Ahmad Mirza, son of Amir Khudaidad.

Uwais and his band of loyalists took to plundering in and around the territory of Sher Muhammad, especially in the neighborhood of Lop Desert (Lob), Kuruktag Desert (Katak) and Sarigh Uighur region possibly present day Gansu in China. But finding little scope for activity in that country, Uwais Khan went to Turkestan. At that time Amir Shaikh Nur-ud-din, son of Sar Bugha Kipchak, one of Amir Timur's generals, was Governor of Turkestan. With him Sher Muhammad had some conflict, and since Uwais Khan was at enmity with Sher Muhammad, Amir Shaikh Nur-ud-din gave his daughter Daulat Sultan Sakanj, in marriage to Uwais Khan. He also gave Uwais Khan much assistance in his attacks on Sher Muhammad, and for a long time there was continual conflict between Uwais Khan and his uncle, the latter being as a rule, victorious. One of these encounters took place at a spot in Moghulistan called Karang Kaingligh.

Finally, Uwais Khan, after a long and rapid march, surprised Sher Muhammad in his camp at midnight in one of these confrontations. The assailants were four hundred strong. When the alarm was raised, Sher Muhammad threw himself into a ditch, while Uwais Khan, surrounding the camp, searched till dawn for Sher Muhammad, slaying all whom he met. Yet, notwithstanding their search and the violence they used towards the people in the camp, no trace of Sher Muhammad was to be found. When day broke Uwais Khan left. Then Sher Muhammad came out of the ditch, and his men having again collected round him, he set out in pursuit of Uwais Khan, who managed to save himself after many narrow escapes. In fine, this hostility continued between them until the natural death of Sher Muhammad, whereupon Uwais Khan succeeded as Moghul Khan of Moghulistan.

== Moghul - Oirat Wars ==
Uwais Khan showed himself to be religiously inclined; he was moreover distinguished among his race for his bravery. Since he had forbidden the Moghuls to attack Muslims, he made war against what he called infidel Oirats; and though he was frequently defeated by them, he persisted in hostilities against them. He was twice taken prisoner by them.

=== Battle of Ming Lak ===
The first occasion was in a battle at a place called Ming Lak, where the Khan, having been seized, was led before Esen Taishi. Esen Taishi felt that if Uwais Khan really was a descendant of Genghis Khan, he would not do him obeisance, but would look upon him as an inferior. So when the Khan was brought in, Esen Taishi dismounted and advanced towards the Khan with great respect. But the Khan turned away his face and did not raise his hand to shake with his rival. Esen Taishi was then convinced, and treating the Khan with much honor, set him at liberty. Uwais Khan, on being asked afterwards why he had not done obeisance to Esen Taishi replied:

If he (Esen Taishi) had treated me in a lordly manner, I should, out of fear for my life, have approached him with reverence. But since he came towards me with bowed head, it occurred to me that the hour of my martyrdom had arrived; and it is not fitting for a Musulmán to do homage to an infidel, or to countenance his actions, therefore I did not salute him.

=== Battle of Kabaka ===
On another occasion, he fought a battle with this same Esen Taishi at a spot called Kabaka, on the confines of Moghulistan. Here, too, he suffered defeat. His horse being shot under him by an arrow, the Khan was obliged to continue on foot. He was on the point of being captured, when Amir Sayyid Ali Dughlat, dismounting from his horse, gave it to the Khan, while he threw himself with his face on the ground. The Oirats, thinking him dead, shot an arrow near his head. When they came near enough, the Amir contrived to lay hold of one of them, who happened to be a man of some distinction, and lifting him up by his coat, turned him from side to side as a shield against the arrows, running all the while by the side of the Khan's bridle, so that it was impossible to shoot an arrow at the Amir. In this way he continued fighting and carrying the man by his clothes for a whole farsakh or 3 miles, till they came to the River Ailah. He then threw the Oirats into the water, and seizing the bridle of the Khan's horse, entered the stream, which came up to his chest. Several men were drowned. The Khan's horse began to swim, while the Amir held up its head, and thus safely conducted the Khan, mounted and armed, across the river. Many men were drowned on that day. It is related that the Khan had with him, on that occasion, two cousins, Hasan Sultan, who wore red armour, and Luqman Sultan, who wore blue. They were both drowned on entering the stream. Amir Sayyid Ali, keeping hold of the Khan's bridle with one hand, did his best to save these two men with the other, but could not reach them. The Khan declared he could distinguish their red and blue jackets deep down in the water. Uwais Khan gave Amir Sayyid Ali Dughlat five presents —one for each of the following acts.

- He had given his horse to the Khán and had himself remained on foot.
- He had seized the Oirat Officer.
- He had used him as a shield for a whole farsakh or approximately 3 miles.
- He had brought the Khan fully armed and mounted across the River Ailah.
- Although he had hold of the Khan, he twice stretched out his hand to save drowning men.

In consideration of these five actions, he gave the Amir five Aymāqs as a reward.

- Turkát.
- Hibat Shirá Sut.
- Uzbeg, a tribe of Khotan.
- Darugha, also a tribe of Khotan.
- Kukanit, also a tribe of Khotan.

=== Battle of Turfan ===
Uwais Khan had another combat with Esen Taishi, in the vicinity of Turfan, and was again defeated and taken prisoner. Esen Taishi said to the Khan on his being brought before him:

This time I will only set you free, on your giving me your sister Makhtum Khanim, as a ransom

There being no help for it, Makhtum Khanim was given to him, and the Khan was set at liberty. It is commonly reported that the Khan had sixty-one engagements with the Oirats, only once was he victorious; on every other occasion he was put to rout.

== Personal life ==
Maulana Khwaja Ahmad said that the Khan was a very powerful man, and that he used, every year, to go hunting wild camels in the country round Turfan, Tarim Basin, Lop Desert and Katak. When he killed a camel he would skin it with his own hands, and take the wool to his mother Sultan Khatun; the Khatun would spin it and make it into shirts and breeches for him, which he wore with sumptuous robes outside. In Turfan water is very scarce, and it was the Khan himself who irrigated the land. He did not get his water from any stream, but having dug a deep well, drew from it a supply of water for irrigation.

Khidmat Maulana told Mirza Muhammad Haidar Dughlat the following story of his uncles, who used to say:

We have often seen the Khan, during the hot season, with the help of his slaves, drawing water from the well in pitchers [kuzah], and pouring it himself over the land. His agriculture was carried out on such a small scale, that the produce of it never attained the value of an ass's load; but this served him for a yearly supply of food.

Although Uwais Khan eventually made Turfan his main base of residence he was forced to leave this city under attacks of Oirats, who previously captured Beshbalik and Kumul, and move to Ilibalik in Ili River Valley. He had two sons: eldest Yunus Khan, who was 13 years old during his death, and youngest Esen Buqa Khan. He also had a daughter, who was married to the Timurid prince Abdul Aziz Mirza, son of Ulugh Beg.

He was a disciple of Maulana Muhammad Kashani, who in turn was a disciple of Khwaja Hasan, and Khwaja Hasan was a disciple of Qutb-i-Masnad Arshad Khwaja Baha-ud-Din Naqshband Bukhari. Being a king did not prevent Uwais Khan from passing his time in such studies as theology. His reign was fairly prosperous. It was during his reign that Amir Khudaidad went on a pilgrimage to Makkah. Moghul records state that Amir Khudaidad performed coronation of six Moghul Khans, from Khizr Khoja to Uwais Khan. After the departure of Amir Khudaidad for Makkah, the accession of Mir Muhammed Shah to his father's rank and titles was achieved.

== Death ==
Satuq Khan was a Chagatai Khan as he was one of those men upon whom Amir Timur had conferred the title of Khan but had confined him like his other Chagatai family members inside Hiyat-i-Khan (Walls of Khan) in Samarkand. Hiyat-i-Khan was a large place and each division of it had a separate name. One of them was the Hauz-i-Bostan-i-Khan (the reservoir of the Khan's garden), where Amir Timur placed another Chagatai Khan named Soyurghatmïsh Khan on whose name he was ruling the Chagatai Khanate. After Soyurghatmïsh Khan's departure to Iraq (or his death), Sultan Mahmud Khan was appointed as the Khan and placed into the Hiyat-i-Khan in his stead. All the mandates of Amir Timur bear the name of these two Khans but in essence the Chagatai Khanate ceased to exist and was replaced by the Timurid Empire.

However, this practice of placing Chagatai Khans as nominal rulers continued till Ulugh Beg's reign who placed Satuq Khan as the new Khan. The mandates of Ulugh Beg bear the name of Satuq Khan. Eventually Ulugh Beg removed Satuq Khan from the Hiyat-i-Khan, and put someone else in his place, whom he also made Khan. He then sent Satuq Khan into Moghulistan to counter the legitimacy of the Chagatai Khans of that region and to place his own man in charge there, if possible.

Uwais Khan was in Issyk Kul, at Bakabulung. Maulana Khwaja Ahmad narrated the incident of the arrival of Satuq Khan's troops that:

Khwaja Abdul-Karim, my cousin, who was on very intimate terms with Uwais Khan, used to relate that one Friday, just before the service, Uwais Khan, who had performed his ablutions and had been shaved, came to me and asked: ‘Of what is my head, in its present state of cleanliness, worthy?’ I replied: ‘A jewelled crown.’ He said: ‘No, it is worthy of martyrdom.’ He had scarcely uttered those words when a messenger came running up, to say that Satuq Khan had arrived. Uwais Khan immediately ordered them to sound the drums, while he himself began to put on his armour. The men who were near at hand quickly gathered round him, and they set out to meet the enemy. There was a stream running between them. When the two forces came in contact, the Khán himself charged forward, and wished to make his horse jump the stream, but the horse sank up to his head [in the mud] on the bank of the river. One of the servants of Mir Muhammad Shah (Jakir by name) was such a good archer that he had not a single rival in the whole tribe, and for this reason the Khan had begged him of Mir Muhammad Shah, for his own service. At the moment when the Khan fell from his horse, Jakir arrived on the spot, and mistaking the Khan for one of the enemy, aimed an arrow at the waist of the Khan, who on being struck rolled over on his back. Then Jakir recognized the Khan, and threw himself upon him. When the news reached Satuq Khan, he set out for the spot and, on his arrival, lay the Khan's head upon his breast, but the last breath of life had fled.

The Moghuls were in the greatest disorder and, moreover, refused to obey Satuq Khan; so that this latter could no longer remain in Moghulistan, but retired to Kashghar. Here he was overpowered by Karakul Ahmad Mirza, who was a grandson of Amir Khudaidad. Soon after this, Ulugh Beg sent an army to Kashghar. They seized Karakul Ahmad Mirza and carried him off to Samarkand, where they cut him in half.

== Genealogy ==
Genealogy of Chughatai Khanates

In Babr Nama written by Babur, Page 19, Chapter 1; described genealogy of his maternal grandfather Yunas Khan as:

"Yunas Khan descended from Chaghatai Khan, the second son of Chingiz Khan (as follows,) Yunas Khan, son of Wais Khan, son of Sher-'ali Aughlon, son of Muhammad Khan, son of Khizr Khwaja Khan, son of Tughluq-timur Khan, son of Aisan-bugha Khan, son of Dawa Khan, son of Baraq Khan, son of Yesuntawa Khan, son of Muatukan, son of Chaghatai Khan, son of Chingiz Khan"

Genealogy of Uwais Khan according to Tarikh e Rashidi|Mirza Muhammad Haidar Dughlat
1. Chingiz Khan; 2. Chaghatai Khan; 3. Mutukan; 4. Yesü Nto'a; 5. Ghiyas-ud-din Baraq; 6. Duwa; 7. Esen Buqa I	8. Tughlugh Timur; 9. Khizr Khoja; 10. Muhammad Khan (Khan of Moghulistan); 11. Shir Ali Oglan; 12. Uwais Khan(Vaise Khan); 13. Yunus Khan; 14. Ahmad Alaq	15. Sultan Said Khan; 16. Abdurashid Khan; 17. Abdul Karim Khan (Yarkand)

"Chughtai Khanates" A research project by Dr Abdul Rauf Mughal

Preceded by Naqsh-i-Jahan	Moghul Khan (1st Reign); 1418–1421	Succeeded by Sher Muhammad
Preceded by Sher Muhammad	Moghul Khan (2nd Reign); 1425–1429	Succeeded by Satuq Khan

== See also ==
- List of Chagatai khans
