= Adil-Sultan =

Khan of Western Chagatai Khanate
- Reign: 1366–1370
- Predecessor: Khabul Shah
- Successor: Soyurghatmïsh Khan
- Died: 1370; Balkh, Khorasan
- Religion: Islam

Adil-Sultan (Chagatai and Persian: عادل سلطان; died 1370) was Khan of the Chagatai Khanate from 1366 to 1370. He was probably a son of Muhammad I ibn Pulad. Very little is known about Adil-Sultan, as the Western Chagatai Khanate produced very few of its own written histories. Almost nothing of his birth and early life is known. Adil-Sultan was likely a puppet of Amir Husayn, before Timur defeated and killed Husayn in 1370. Adil-Sultan was likely killed around the same time as Husayn.

Preceded by Khabul Shah	Khan of Chagatai Khanate; 1366–1370	Succeeded by Soyurghatmïsh Khan
