= Shah Temur =

Khan of Western Chagatai Khanate
- Reign: 1358
- Predecessor: Bayan Qulï
- Successor: Tughlugh Timur
- Born: unknown
- Died: 1358

Shah Temur (Chagatai and Persian: شاه تیمور; died 1358) was khan of the Chagatai Khanate for a period in 1358.

In 1358 ‘Abdullah, who had recently succeeded Qazaghan to the powerful position of amir of the ulus, executed his father’s puppet khan Bayan Quli and installed Shah Temur in his place. ‘Abd Allah’s position within the Chagatai ulus was weak, however, and in that same year two tribal leaders, Hajji Beg and Buyan Suldus, drove him from power. They then killed Shah Temur, and Buyan Suldus became amir of the ulus.
