= Timeline of the Ilkhanate =

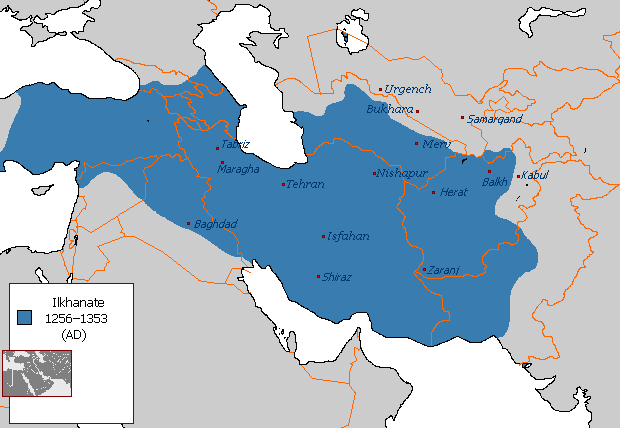
The Ilkhanate from 1256-1353

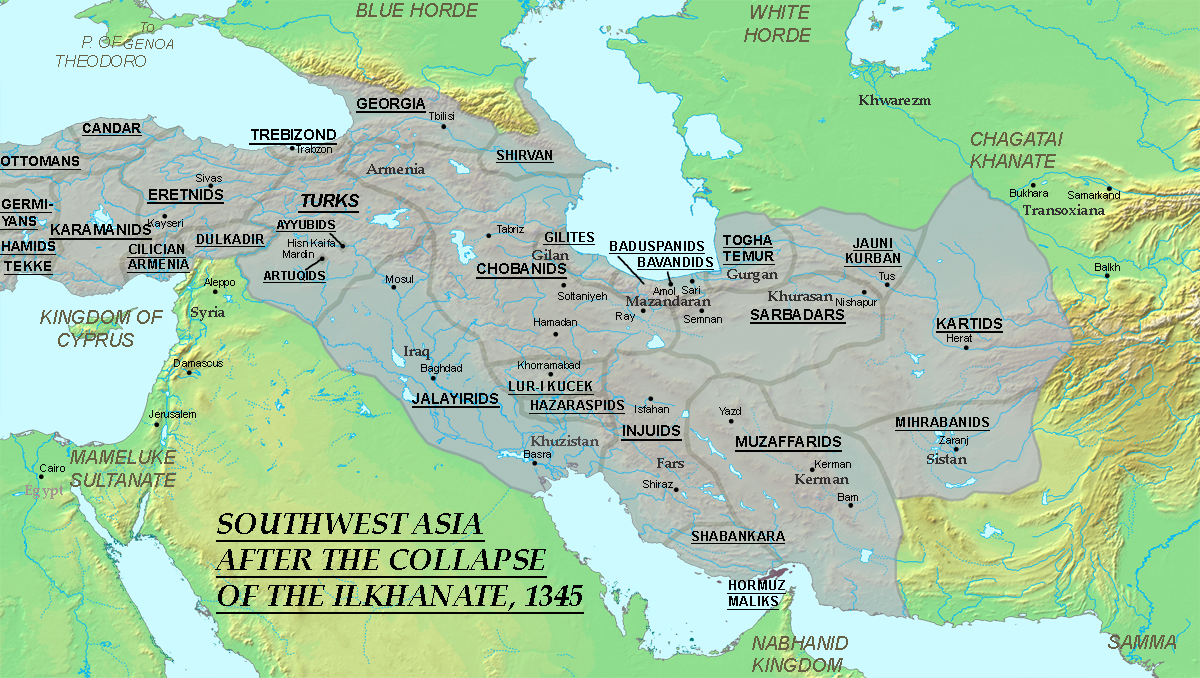
The disintegration of the Ilkhanate, 1345

This is a timeline of the Ilkhanate.

== 13th century ==
=== 1210s ===
Year	Date	Event
1217		Hulagu Khan is born to Tolui and Sorghaghtani Beki
1218	autumn	Mongol conquest of Khwarezmia: Muhammad II of Khwarezm's forces clash with a Mongol army led by Jochi and Subutai, the battle ending inconclusively
1218	winter	Mongol conquest of Khwarezmia: A Muslim merchant delegation sent by Genghis Khan arrives at Otrar and the governor Inalchuq kills them, seizing their goods for himself; a sole survivor reaches Mongolia and alerts Genghis, who sends three more envoys to demand custody of Inalchuq - they are also killed
1219	fall	Mongol conquest of Khwarezmia: Ögedei and Chagatai take Otrar and massacres its population; Genghis Khan dispatches Jochi to conquer Syr Darya and another army to conquer Fergana

=== 1220s ===
Year	Date	Event
1220	15 February	Mongol conquest of Khwarezmia: Genghis Khan takes Bukhara and places Yelü Ahai in control of Transoxiana
1220	16 March	Mongol conquest of Khwarezmia: Genghis Khan takes Samarkand and Muhammad II of Khwarezm flees to Nishapur; Genghis Khan dispatches Jebe and Subutai to destroy the sultan
1220	May	Mongol conquest of Khwarezmia: Jebe and Subutai take Balkh and capture Muhammad II of Khwarezm's mother Terken Khatun and family in the Zagros Mountains
1220	winter	Mongol conquest of Khwarezmia: Muhammad II of Khwarezm dies
1221	March	Mongol conquest of Khwarezmia: Tolui destroys Merv
1221	April	Mongol conquest of Khwarezmia: Jochi, Chagatai, and Ögedei destroy Urgench while Tolui takes Nishapur and Herat
1221	spring	Battle of Parwan: Jalal al-Din Mangburni defeats a Mongol army led by Shigi Qutuqu in the Hindu Kush
1221		Mongol conquest of Khwarezmia: Genghis Khan takes Termez
1221		Siege of Bamyan: Genghis Khan takes Bamyan; Chagatai's son Mutukan dies in the process
1221	November	Battle of Indus: Genghis Khan defeats Jalal al-Din Mangburni, who swims across the Indus River and escapes

=== 1230s ===
Year	Date	Event
1231	August	Mongol conquest of Khwarezmia: Chormaqan defeats Jalal al-Din Mangburni, who escapes only to be killed by an unknown Kurd; so ends the Khwarazmian dynasty
1232		Tolui is struck by sickness and dies
1236		Mongol invasions of Georgia: Chormaqan subjugates Georgia and Armenia

=== 1240s ===
Year	Date	Event
1242		Mongol invasions of Anatolia: Mongols take Erzurum
1243	26 June	Battle of Köse Dağ: Baiju defeats Kaykhusraw II and subjugates the Armenian Kingdom of Cilicia
1244		The Ayyubid dynasty gives tribute to the Mongols
1244		Badr al-Din Lu'lu' of Mosul submits to the Mongol Empire

=== 1250s ===
Year	Date	Event
1251	fall	Möngke Khan places Hulagu Khan in charge of North China
1252	summer	Möngke Khan charges Hulagu Khan with the invasion of taking Baghdad
1256	20 November	Hulagu Khan takes Alamut from the Assassins
1256		Mongols defeat Kaykaus II at Aksaray and enthrone Kilij Arslan IV
1258	17 January	Siege of Baghdad (1258): Hulagu Khan sends a Mongol contingent across the Tigris River which suffers a defeat against Aybak
1258	18 January	Siege of Baghdad (1258): Baiju floods the enemy camp and attacks, driving them back
1258	29 January	Siege of Baghdad (1258): Hulagu Khan lays siege to Baghdad
1258	1 February	Siege of Baghdad (1258): Mongol siege weapons breach Baghdad's Ajami tower
1258	3 February	Siege of Baghdad (1258): Mongol forces take Baghdad's walls
1258	10 February	Siege of Baghdad (1258): Al-Musta'sim, his sons, and 3,000 dignitaries surrender
1258	13 February	Siege of Baghdad (1258): Mongols sack Baghdad
1258	20 February	Siege of Baghdad (1258): Al-Musta'sim and his family are executed; so ends the first Abbasid Caliphate
1258		Hulagu Khan takes the title of Ilkhan, meaning "obedient khan"
1258	March	Öljei Khatun's brother Bukha-Temur sacks Wasit

=== 1260s ===
Year	Date	Event
1260	January	Siege of Aleppo (1260): Hulagu Khan takes Aleppo from An-Nasir Yusuf; so ends the Ayyubid dynasty
1260		The Principality of Antioch submits to the Mongol Empire
1260	6 June	Hulagu Khan receives news of Möngke Khan's death and retreats to Ahlat
1260	26 July	Battle of Ain Jalut: Qutuz of the Mamluks advance into Palestine and drive the Mongols from Gaza
1260	spring	Hulagu Khan's son Yoshmut and commander Elege of the Jalayir take Mayyafaraqin and Mardin
1260	August	Kitbuqa sacks Sidon
1260	3 September	Battle of Ain Jalut: Qutuz of the Mamluks defeats Mongol forces under Kitbuqa and push them back to the Euphrates
1260	10 December	First Battle of Homs: Baibars defeats a Mongol expedition into Syria
1260		Toluid Civil War: Berke of the Golden Horde allies with Ariq Böke and declares war on Hulagu Khan
1261		Mosul and Cizre rebel
1262	summer	Rebellions in Mosul and Cizre are suppressed
1262	November	Hulagu Khan kills his vizier Saif-ud-Din Bitigchi and replaces him with Shams al-Din Juvayni
1262		Berke–Hulagu war: Berke of the Golden Horde allies with the Mamluks and invades Azerbaijan
1262		Hulagu Khan gives Khorasan and Mazandaran to his son Abaqa and Azerbaijan to his other son Yoshmut
1263	13 January	Berke–Hulagu war: Berke defeats Hulagu Khan's army on the Terek River
1265	8 February	Hulagu Khan dies and is succeeded by his son Abaqa Khan
1266		Berke–Hulagu war: Berke dies in Tbilisi and is succeeded by his grandnephew Mengu-Timur

=== 1270s ===
Year	Date	Event
1270		Ghiyas-ud-din Baraq of the Chagatai Khanate invades the Ilkhanate but suffers defeat at the battle of Qara-Su near Herat
1271		Samagar raids Qalaat al-Madiq
1273	January	Yisüder, brother of Abaqa, sacks Bukhara
1277	15 April	Battle of Elbistan: Mamluks defeat Mongol forces at Elbistan

=== 1280s ===
Year	Date	Event
1281	29 October	Second Battle of Homs: Abaqa's brother Möngke Temur is defeated by Mamluk forces
1282		Abaqa dies and is succeeded by his brother Tekuder, a Muslim
1284		Arghun, son of Abaqa, deposes Tekuder

=== 1290s ===
Year	Date	Event
1290		Golden Horde attacks Ilkhanate but is defeated by Arghun
1290		Nawrūz rebels and fails
1291	7 March	Arghun is murdered by the very unpleasant Taghachar of the Baarin, who then enthrones Gaykhatu, Arghun's brother
1294		Gaykhatu copies the Yuan dynasty and tries to introduce paper money, which fails fantastically
1295		Taghachar deposes Gaykhatu and enthrones Baydu
1295	October	Ghazan, son of Arghun, deposes Baydu and becomes ruler; also a Muslim
1299	22–23 December	Battle of Wadi al-Khazandar: Ghazan defeats An-Nasir Muhammad of the Mamluks

== 14th century ==
=== 1300s ===
Year	Date	Event
1301		Ghazan makes a failed attempt to take Aleppo
1303	20 April	Battle of Marj al-Saffar (1303): Mongol army under Kutlushah is defeated by the Mamluks
1304	11 May	Ghazan dies and is succeeded by his brother Öljaitü
1307	June	Ilkhanate tributizes Gilan, Ghazni, and Sistan
1308	winter	Öljaitü converts to Twelver Shi'ism

=== 1310s ===
Year	Date	Event
1310		Kurds and Arabs in Erbil massacre the Christian population with the Ilkhanate's permission
1312		Ilkhanate seizes Ghazni
1316		Esen Buqa–Ayurbarwada war: Conflict breaks out between the Chagatai Khanate and the Yuan dynasty and Ilkhanate
1316	16 December	Öljaitü dies and is succeeded by his son Abu Sa'id Bahadur Khan
1318		Chagataid elements rebel in Khorasan
1318		Öz Beg Khan attacks the Ilkhanate
1319	13 July	Chupan defeats Mongol rebellions at the battle of Zanjan-Rud

=== 1320s ===
Year	Date	Event
1323		Ilkhanate makes peace with the Mamluk Sultunate

=== 1330s ===
Year	Date	Event
1335	30 November	Abu Sa'id Bahadur Khan dies and Ghiyas al-Din ibn Rashid al-Din enthrones Arpa Ke'un, a descendant of Ariq Böke; effective end of the Ilkhanate
1336		Arpa Ke'un is defeated by 'Ali Padsah of Baghdad, who enthrones Musa
1337		Musa is deposed by Hasan Buzurg, who enthrones Muhammad Khan
1338		Muhammad Khan is deposed by Hasan Kuchak, who enthrones Jahan Temür

=== 1340s ===
Year	Date	Event
1346		Black Plague spreads to the Ilkhanate

=== 1350s ===
Year	Date	Event
1356		Shaikh Awais Jalayir sets up his own Jalairid Sultanate; so ends the Ilkhanate

== See also ==
- Timeline of the Yuan dynasty
- Timeline of the Chagatai Khanate
- Timeline of the Golden Horde
- Timeline of the Mongol Empire
- Timeline of Mongols prior to the Mongol Empire

== Bibliography ==
- Andrade, Tonio (2016), The Gunpowder Age: China, Military Innovation, and the Rise of the West in World History, Princeton University Press, ISBN 978-0-691-13597-7.
- Asimov, M.S. (1998), History of civilizations of Central Asia Volume IV The age of achievement: A.D. 750 to the end of the fifteenth century Part One The historical, social and economic setting, UNESCO Publishing
- Atwood, Christopher P. (2004), Encyclopedia of Mongolia and the Mongol Empire, Facts On File
- Barfield, Thomas (1989), The Perilous Frontier: Nomadic Empires and China, Basil Blackwell
- Barrett, Timothy Hugh (2008), The Woman Who Discovered Printing, Great Britain: Yale University Press, ISBN 978-0-300-12728-7 (alk. paper)
- Beckwith, Christopher I. (2009), Empires of the Silk Road: A History of Central Eurasia from the Bronze Age to the Present, Princeton University Press, ISBN 978-0-691-13589-2
- Beckwith, Christopher I (1987), The Tibetan Empire in Central Asia: A History of the Struggle for Great Power among Tibetans, Turks, Arabs, and Chinese during the Early Middle Ages, Princeton University Press
- Biran, Michal (2005), The Empire of the Qara Khitai in Eurasian History: Between China and the Islamic World, Cambridge Studies in Islamic Civilization, Cambridge, England: Cambridge University Press, ISBN 0521842263
- Bregel, Yuri (2003), An Historical Atlas of Central Asia, Brill
- Drompp, Michael Robert (2005), Tang China And The Collapse Of The Uighur Empire: A Documentary History, Brill
- Ebrey, Patricia Buckley (1999), The Cambridge Illustrated History of China, Cambridge: Cambridge University Press, ISBN 0-521-66991-X (paperback).
- Ebrey, Patricia Buckley; Walthall, Anne; Palais, James B. (2006), East Asia: A Cultural, Social, and Political History, Boston: Houghton Mifflin, ISBN 0-618-13384-4
- Golden, Peter B. (1992), An Introduction to the History of the Turkic Peoples: Ethnogenesis and State-Formation in Medieval and Early Modern Eurasia and the Middle East, Wiesbaden: Otto Harrassowitz, ISBN 3-447-03274-X
- Graff, David A. (2002), Medieval Chinese Warfare, 300-900, Warfare and History, London: Routledge, ISBN 0415239559
- Graff, David Andrew (2016), The Eurasian Way of War Military Practice in Seventh-Century China and Byzantium, Routledge, ISBN 978-0-415-46034-7.
- Haywood, John (1998), Historical Atlas of the Medieval World, AD 600-1492, Barnes & Noble
- Jackson, Peter (2005), The Mongols and the West, Pearson Education Limited
- Latourette, Kenneth Scott (1964), The Chinese, their history and culture, Volumes 1-2, Macmillan
- Lorge, Peter A. (2008), The Asian Military Revolution: from Gunpowder to the Bomb, Cambridge University Press, ISBN 978-0-521-60954-8
- Luttwak, Edward N. (2009), The Grand Strategy of the Byzantine Empire, The Belknap Press of Harvard University Press
- Millward, James (2009), Eurasian Crossroads: A History of Xinjiang, Columbia University Press, ISBN 978-0231125970
- Mote, F. W. (2003), Imperial China: 900–1800, Harvard University Press, ISBN 978-0674012127
- Needham, Joseph (1986), Science & Civilisation in China, vol. V:7: The Gunpowder Epic, Cambridge University Press, ISBN 0-521-30358-3
- Rong, Xinjiang (2013), Eighteen Lectures on Dunhuang, Brill
- Schafer, Edward H. (1985), The Golden Peaches of Samarkand: A study of T'ang Exotics, University of California Press
- Shaban, M. A. (1979), The ʿAbbāsid Revolution, Cambridge: Cambridge University Press, ISBN 0-521-29534-3
- Sinor, Denis (1990), The Cambridge History of Early Inner Asia, Volume 1, Cambridge University Press
- Sima, Guang (2015), Bóyángbǎn Zīzhìtōngjiàn 54 huánghòu shīzōng 柏楊版資治通鑑54皇后The Cambridge History of Early Inner Asia, Volume 1, Yuǎnliú chūbǎnshìyè gǔfèn yǒuxiàn gōngsī, ISBN 978-957-32-0876-1
- Skaff, Jonathan Karam (2012), Sui-Tang China and Its Turko-Mongol Neighbors: Culture, Power, and Connections, 580-800 (Oxford Studies in Early Empires), Oxford University Press, ISBN 978-0190886974
- Standen, Naomi (2007), Unbounded Loyalty Frontier Crossings in Liao China, University of Hawai'i Press
- Steinhardt, Nancy Shatzman (1997), Liao Architecture, University of Hawaii Press
- Twitchett, Denis C. (1979), The Cambridge History of China, Vol. 3, Sui and T'ang China, 589–906, Cambridge University Press
- Twitchett, Denis (1994), "The Liao", The Cambridge History of China, Volume 6, Alien Regime and Border States, 907-1368, Cambridge: Cambridge University Press, pp. 43–153, ISBN 0521243319
- Twitchett, Denis (2009), The Cambridge History of China Volume 5 The Sung dynasty and its Predecessors, 907-1279, Cambridge University Press
- Wang, Zhenping (2013), Tang China in Multi-Polar Asia: A History of Diplomacy and War, University of Hawaii Press
- Wilkinson, Endymion (2015). Chinese History: A New Manual, 4th edition. Cambridge, MA: Harvard University Asia Center distributed by Harvard University Press. ISBN 9780674088467.
- Xiong, Victor Cunrui (2000), Sui-Tang Chang'an: A Study in the Urban History of Late Medieval China (Michigan Monographs in Chinese Studies), U OF M CENTER FOR CHINESE STUDIES, ISBN 0892641371
- Xiong, Victor Cunrui (2009), Historical Dictionary of Medieval China, United States of America: Scarecrow Press, Inc., ISBN 978-0810860537
- Xu, Elina-Qian (2005), HISTORICAL DEVELOPMENT OF THE PRE-DYNASTIC KHITAN, Institute for Asian and African Studies 7
- Xue, Zongzheng (1992), Turkic peoples, 中国社会科学出版社
- Yuan, Shu (2001), Bóyángbǎn Tōngjiàn jìshìběnmò 28 dìèrcìhuànguánshídài 柏楊版通鑑記事本末28第二次宦官時代, Yuǎnliú chūbǎnshìyè gǔfèn yǒuxiàn gōngsī, ISBN 957-32-4273-7
- Yule, Henry (1915), Cathay and the Way Thither: Being a Collection of Medieval Notices of China, Vol I: Preliminary Essay on the Intercourse Between China and the Western Nations Previous to the Discovery of the Cape Route, Hakluyt Society
