= Sali Noyan =

13th century Mongol Empire general

Sali Noyan also known as Sali Bahadur or Sali the Brave, was an important Mongol general of Möngke Khan, Khagan of the Mongol Empire. He was instrumental in the 13th century CE, in keeping control over most of Afghanistan where a permanent garrison of Mongol troops was quartered in the Kunduz-Baghlan area, and in 1253 fell under the jurisdiction of Sali Noyan. In 1252-3 Sali Noyan of the Tatar clan was sent to the Indian borderlands at the head of fresh troops, and was given authority over the Mongols later known as Qara'unas. Sali himself was subordinate to Möngke's brother Hulagu Khan.

The Kashmiris were conquered in 1235 by the Mongols but they revolted in 1254–1255, and Möngke Khan, who became Great Khan in 1251, appointed his generals, Sali and Takudar, to replace the court appointed Buddhist master, Otochi, as darugachi of Kashmir. However, the Kashmiri king killed Otochi at Srinagar. Sali invaded Kashmir, killing the king, and put down the rebellion, after which the country remained subject to the Mongol Empire for many years.

Due to the internal conflicts of the Delhi Sultanate, the Mamluk Sultan Nasiruddin Mahmud's brother, Jalal al-Din Masud, fled into Mongol territory traveled to the Mongol capital at Karakorum in 1248. When Möngke was crowned as Khagan, Jalal al-Din Masud attended the ceremony and asked help from Möngke. Möngke ordered Sali to assist him to recover his ancestral realm. Sali made successive attacks on Multan and Lahore. Shamsuddin Muhammad bin Abu Bakr, the client Malik of Herat, accompanied the Mongols. Jalal al-Din was installed as client ruler of Lahore, Kujah and Sodra.

In 1257 the governor of Sindh offered his entire province to Hulagu Khan, Mongke's brother, and sought Mongol protection from his overlord in Delhi. Hulagu led a strong force under Sali into Sindh. In the winter of 1257 – beginning of 1258, Sali Noyan entered Sindh in strength and dismantled the fortifications of Multan; his forces may also have invested the island fortress of Bukkur on the Indus.

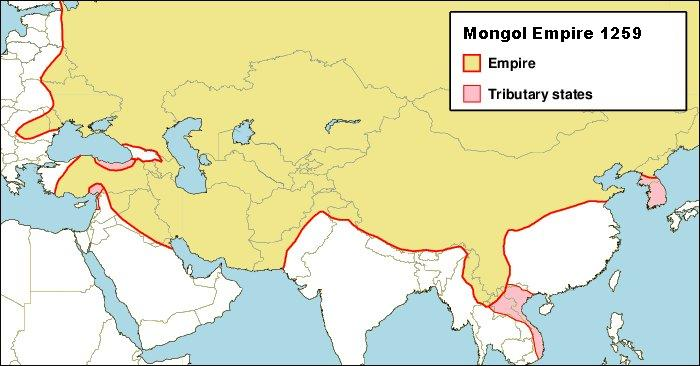
The Mongol Empire during the reign of Mongke Khan (r.1251-59)

But Hulagu refused to sanction a grand invasion of the Delhi Sultanate and a few years later diplomatic correspondence between the two rulers confirmed the growing desire for peace. Hulagu had many other areas of conquests to take care of in Syria and southwestern Asia. Large-scale Mongol invasions of India ceased and the Delhi Sultans used the respite to recover the frontier towns like Multan, Uch, and Lahore, and to punish the local Ranas and Rais who had joined hands with either the Khwarazim or the Mongol invaders.

Sali Noyan's position was later inherited by his son Uladu Noyan, and grandson Baktut Noyan. These Turco-Mongol garrison troops (tamma) formed the Qara'unas faction, and by the 14th Century had allied with the Chaghataite Khanate. Under the rule of Temür the Qara'unas were given to Chekü Barlas, and then to his son Jahānshāh. Forbes Manz notes that these Kunduz-Baghlan forces appear to have remained cohesive and influential throughout the Timurid period, though under different leaders and different names, up until the Uzbek invasion. By the Islamic year 900 (1494–1495 CE), the area was noted in the Baburnama as ruled by a Qipchaq emir.
