= Muhammad I ibn Pulad =

Muhammad Khan I Ibn Pulad
- Khan of The Chagataids

Khan of Chagatai Khanate
- Reign: 1342 – 1343
- Predecessor: 'Ali-Sultan
- Successor: Qazan Khan ibn Yasaur
- Born: Chagatai Khanate (Present Central Asia)
- Died: c. 1343; Chagatai Khanate (Present Central Asia)
Names
- Muhammad Khan Bin Pulad Bin Könchek Bin Duwa Bin Baraq Bin Yesünto'a Bin Mutukan Bin Chagatai Khan
Regnal name
- Muhammad Khan I
- House: Borjigid
- Father: Pulad
- Religion: Sunni Islam

Muhammad ibn Pulad or, Muhammad Khan or, Muhammad Khan I (Chagatai and Persian: محمد ابن پولاد; r. 1342–1343) was a Khan of the Chagatai Khanate, He was a grandson of former Chagatai Khan Könchek, through his son Pulad.

Not much is known about him. According to Shajrat ul Atrak, a genealogical chronicle of the Turks and Tatars, he tried to halt the political dissolution within his ulus. Muhammad was apparently Muslim judging by his name.

Preceded by 'Ali-Sultan	Khan of Chagatai Khanate; 1342–1343	Succeeded by Qazan Khan ibn Yasaur
