= Bayan Qulï =

Mongol khan of Central Asia (d. 1358)

Khan of Western Chagatai Khanate
- Reign: 1348–1358
- Predecessor: Danishmandchi
- Successor: Shah Temur
- Born: unknown
- Died: 1358

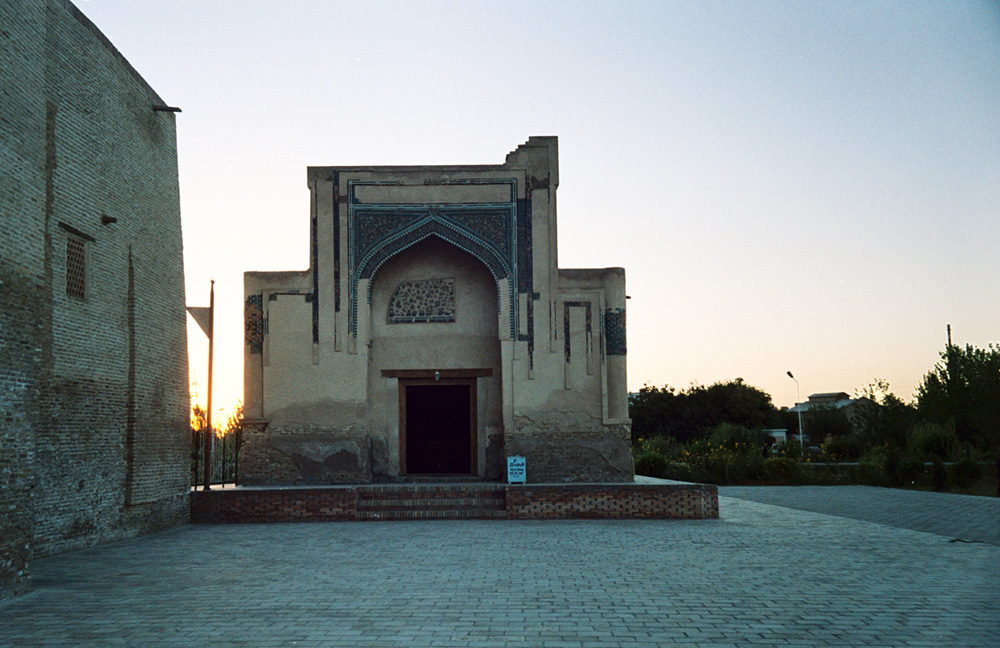
Bayan-Quli Khan Mausoleum in Bukhara.

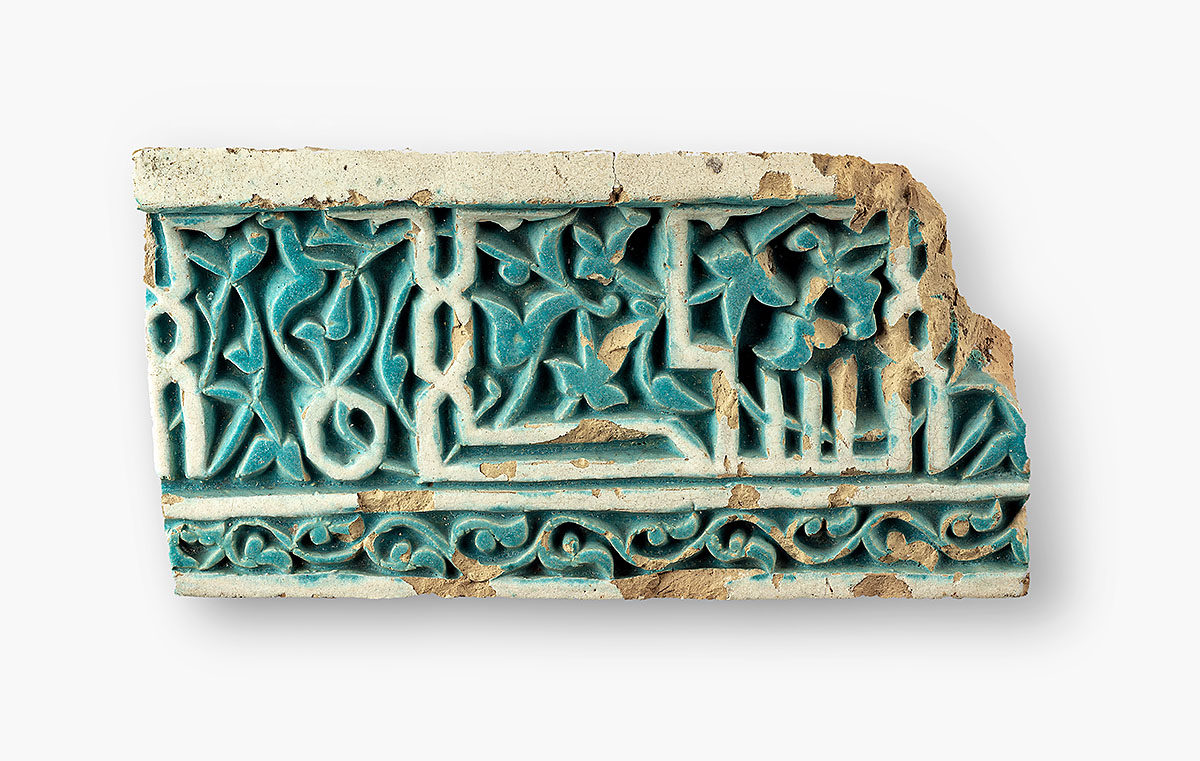
Piece of Buyan Kuli Khan mausoleum frieze

Bayan Qulï (Chagatai and Persian: بیان قلی; died 1358) was the effectively puppet khan of the Chagatai Khanate from 1348 to 1358 and a grandson of Duwa.

In 1348 Bayan Qulï was raised to the position of khan by the ruler of the Qara'unas, Amir Qazaghan, who had effectively taken control of the Chagatai ulus in 1346. For the next decade he remained Qazaghan's puppet, exercising little real authority. In 1358 Qazaghan was assassinated and succeeded by his son ‘Abdullah. Not long after his ascension, ‘Abdullah had Bayan Qulï killed and selected a new puppet, Shah Temur, to succeed him. Bayan Qulï’s death was used as a pretext by ‘Abdullah’s enemies to bring about his downfall that same year.

The Mongols, prior to the conquest of Ma wara'u'n-nahr and Semirechye, were primarily shamanistic. However, in the 14th century many of those in Central Asia converted to Islam. Bayan-Quli Khan was a Muslim and a faithful stalwart of a Khorasani sheikh, Saif ed-Din Boharsi. Therefore, he was buried opposite the sheikh's grave. The mausoleum rises above the Bayan-Quli Khan grave since 1358.

The dinars, coined in Shahrisabz in 1357 (758), referred to Bayan Quli's piousness, engraved as they were with the words: "Bayan-Quli-bahadur Khan is the greatest sultan. May Allah prolong his reign".

== See also ==
- Saif ed-Din Bokharzi & Bayan-Quli Khan Mausoleums

Preceded by:
Danishmandchi (?)
Khan of Chagatai Khanate
1348–1358
Followed by:
Shah Temur

Tughlugh Timur
