= Negübei =

Mongolian prince

Khan of the Chagatai Khanate
- Reign: 1271–1272?
- Predecessor: Ghiyas-ud-din Baraq
- Successor: Buqa Temür
- Died: 1272?

Negübei was Khan of the Chagatai Khanate (1271–1272?). He was the son of Sarban.

In 1271 Negübei was appointed by Kaidu as head of the Chagatai Khanate. A year after his enthronement, however, he rebelled against his master, possibly in conjunction with the revolts launched by the sons of Alghu and Baraq. Kaidu responded by sending an army against Negübei, and the latter was forced to flee to the east. Soon afterward, he was killed and replaced by Buqa Temür.

Preceded by Baraq	Khan of Chagatai Khanate; 1271–127?	Succeeded by Buqa Temür
