= Khabul Shah =

14th century Khan of the Chagatai Khanate

Khan of Western Chagatai Khanate
- Reign: c. 1364–1366
- Predecessor: Tughlugh Timur
- Successor: Adil-Sultan
- Died: c. 1366

Khabul Shah (died c. 1366) was the khan of the Chagatai Khanate in c. 1364–1366.

== Sources ==
- Manz, Beatrice Forbes, The Rise and Rule of Tamerlane. Cambridge University Press, 1989, ISBN 0-521-34595-2.

Preceded by Tughlugh Timur	Khan of Chagatai Khanate; 1364–1366	Succeeded by Adil-Sultan
