= Yasa'ur =

Mongolian prince based in Central Asia and Iran

Yasa'ur (died 1320) was a Chagatai prince who launched a revolt against the Ilkhan Abu Sa'id. He was the son of Chübei, grandson of Alghu Khan, and a great-great-grandson of Chagatai Khan. His mother was the daughter of Ulugh Yasa'ur, a prominent Chagatai commander of the Jalayir tribe.

Yasa'ur had originally resided within the Chagatai ulus. In 1314 he participated in a campaign against the Ilkhanate, together with the Chagatai Khan's brother Kebek and a Neguderi prince Daud Khwaja (a son of Qutlugh Khwaja) who had been expelled from his territories by the Ilkhan the previous year. Their forces defeated the Ilkhan army near the banks of the Murgab River; they then marched to Herat. The Ilkhan Öljeitü then set off with an army for the east, while the Chagataiid forces were recalled by the khan Esen Buqa.

Around this time Yasa'ur, who had been accused by Kebek of cooperated with the Ilkhanid forces during the invasion, defected to Öljeitü. His forces engaged in battle with the Chagataiid troops; an Ilkhanid army that had crossed the Oxus joined the fighting and secured victory for Yasa'ur. He, escorted by the Ilkhanid force, entered Khorasan; Öljeitü then allowed him to take control of the pasture lands of the Badghis.

Öljeitü died in 1316 and was succeeded as Ilkhan by his son Abu Sa'id. Yasa'ur initially pledged loyalty to the new Ilkhan, but was apparently uncooperative with Ilkhanid authorities. In early 1319 he openly revolted against Abu Sa'id, invading the province of Mazandaran. This revolt coincided with an invasion by Uzbeg Khan, forcing the Ilkhanids to defend against two attacks simultaneously. Amir Husain (the father of Hasan Buzurg, who founded the Jalayirid dynasty in Baghdad) was sent to deal with Yasa'ur. The Amir Coban, overestimating the strength of Yasa'ur, also planned to march against the Chagataiid prince at the head of a 20,000-strong army, but eventually decided to defend against Uzbeg's forces.

Amir Husain's approach caused Yasa'ur to retreat from Mazandaran. From Tus he then sent a force to take Herat, whose ruler, the Kartid Giyath al-Din, had declared his loyalty to the Ilkhanids. The siege of Herat was unsuccessful, however, as upon hearing of the approach of the Ilkhanid army Yasa'ur withdrew into southern Afghanistan. In the following year, he was killed by Kebek, who had recently become Chagatai Khan and who deemed Yasa'ur to still be a threat.

Yasa'ur's personal troops eventually formed the basis of the Yasa'uri, a group that gained influence within the Chagatai ulus in the mid-fourteenth century.
