= Buqa Temür =

Khan of the Chagatai Khanate from 1272 to 1282

Khan of the Chagatai Khanate
- Reign: 1272–1282
- Predecessor: Negübei
- Successor: Duwa
- Died: 1282

Buqa Temür (Chagatai and Persian: بوقا تیمور; Cyrillic Mongolian: Бөхтөмөр, not to be confused with Tuka Timur, son of Djötchi, brother of Berke) was Khan of the Chagatai Khanate (1272?-1282). He was the son of Qadaqchi.

Sometime around 1272 Buqa Temür killed Negübei, who had risen in revolt against Kaidu. Perhaps as a reward for this, Kaidu appointed him as head of the Chagatai Khanate. Soon after, he was stricken by illness, and the rest of his reign was marked by a failure to impose his authority. He was helpless against the raids of the sons of Alghu and Baraq, as well as forces of the Ilkhanate. In 1282 he was replaced by Duwa.

Preceded by Negübei	Khan of Chagatai Khanate; 127?–1282	Succeeded by Duwa
