= Hajji Beg Barlas =

Barlas tribal leader

Hajji Beg Barlas (died 1361) was a leader of the Barlas tribe. He was the immediate predecessor in this role to Timur, who later founded the Timurid Empire.

== Background ==
Hajji Beg was a member of the Barlas tribe and claimed descent from Qarachar Noyan, one of the Mongol nobles assigned by Genghis Khan to his son Chagatai. Hajji Beg and Timur shared a common ancestor in Qarachar, though they descended from different sons.

== Life ==
Hajji Beg is first mentioned in 1358 or 1359, when he participated in the overthrow of the Qara'unas ‘Abdullah, who was effectively in control of the southern Chagatai Khanate. 'Abd Allah, who had recently taken power, was young and inexperienced, and his move to Samarkand threatened Hajji Beg, whose territories were centered in the nearby city of Kish. Together with another tribal leader named Buyan Suldus, Hajji Beg removed him from power and killed his puppet khan Shah Temur. Buyan Suldus was then raised to 'Abd Allah's former position of amir.

Buyan Suldus' refusal to enforce his authority, as well as a continuing state of chaos within the Chagatai ulus, led to the Khan of Moghulistan, Tughlugh Timur, to invade in 1360. Most of the Chagatai leaders did not oppose the invasion; many of them took the opportunity to pillage each other's lands. The Yasa'ur Hajji Mahmudshah, whose tribe bordered the Barlas, decided to raid their territory with a Moghul army. Hajji Beg decided at first to resist, but seeing that the Moghuls were much stronger, he fled to Khorasan.

During his retreat, Hajji Beg was accompanied by a member of a prominent Barlas family, Timur. When they reached the Oxus River, Timur asked to return to Kish so that he could maintain order within the Barlas region. Timur's prominent standings within the Barlas and with several members of the Moghul elite, however, resulted in Tughlugh Temur's appointing him as the ruler of the Barlas region. Timur then aligned himself with tribal leaders that were hostile to Hajji Beg, eventually throwing his support behind Amir Husayn, a nephew of 'Abd Allah and the current leader of the Qara'unas. In the meantime, the Moghuls abandoned the region and headed back to Moghulistan.

Soon afterwards, Hajji Beg returned to the Chagatai ulus in an effort to regain control of the Barlas. He went to the ruler of the Jalayir, Bayazid, and together they attacked the Yasa'uri. When Timur heard of this, he moved his army in support of the Yasa'uri. The two sides met in battle, and while its outcome is disagreed upon, it caused the Barlas emirs as well as the army to defect back to Hajji Beg. As a result, Timur was constrained to submit to Hajji Beg. The Barlas and Jalayir then again attacked the Yasa'uri and defeated them; this victory secured Hajji Beg's position as leader of his tribe.

In the spring of 1361 Tughlugh Timur again invaded the ulus. Knowing that both Bayazid Jalayir and Buyan Suldus had decided to pledge their allegiance to the khan, Hajji Beg planned to do so as well. Tughlugh Timur's execution of Bayazid, however, prompted him to change his mind. He went to Kish to gather troops, and then crossed the Oxus into Khorasan, but there he was killed by a group of Turks. Tughlugh Timur then gave Timur command of Kish a second time, but he would lose it soon afterwards.
