= Danishmandchi =

Mongolian ruler of Central Asia

Khan of the Western Chagatai Khanate
- Reign: 1346–1348
- Predecessor: Qazan Khan ibn Yasaur
- Successor: Bayan Qulï (as Khan of the Western Chagatai Khanate); Tughlugh Timur (as Khan of Moghulistan)
- Died: 1348
- Issue: Soyurgatmish
- Father: Kaidu

Dānishmandchī (Chagatai and Persian: دانشمندچی; died 1348) was Khan of the Chagatai Khanate from 1346 to 1348. He was the second Khan of the Western Chagatai ulus to be descended from Ögedei, the third son of Genghis Khan.

In 1346 he was raised to the Khanship by Qazaghan, who was the leader of the Qara'unas and who recently had taken effective control of the ulus. Two years later Qazaghan had him executed and replaced him with Bayan Qulï, who was a member of the house of Chagatai Khan.

Preceded by:
Qazan Khan
Khan of Chagatai Khanate
1346–1348
Followed by:
Bayan Qulï

Tughlugh Timur
