= Kebek =

Mongolian ruler of Central Asia

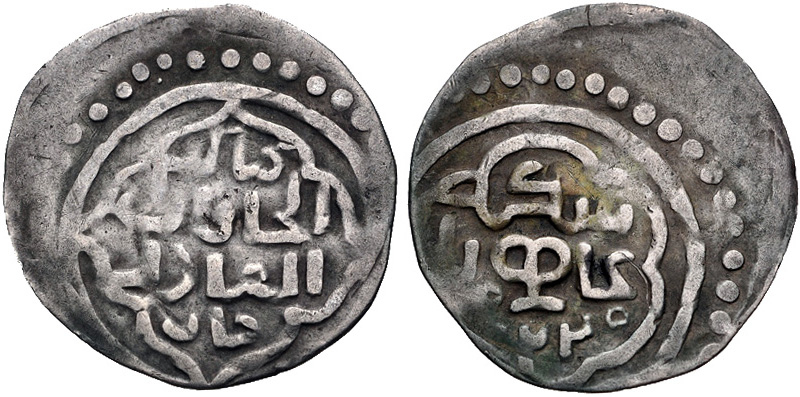
- Silver coin of Kebek, second reign, circa AH 720-726 AD 1320-1326. Bukhara mint. Dated AH (7)22 (AD 1322).

Khan of the Chagatai Khanate
- Reign: 1309–1310, 1318–1325
- Predecessor: Taliqu, Esen Buqa I
- Successor: Esen Buqa I, Eljigidey
- Died: 1325

Kebek (died 1325/1326) was Khan of the Chagatai Khanate from 1309 until 1310, and again from c. 1318 until his death.

== Early life ==
Kebek was the son of Duwa, who was the Khan from 1282 until 1307. Duwa sent several expeditions to the Delhi Sultanate of India. Of these, the 1306 expedition was led by a general, whose name appears variously as "Kabak" or "Kapak" in the writings of the Delhi courtier Amir Khusrau. René Grousset identified this general as Duwa Khan's son Kebek. However, Kishori Saran Lal believes this general must have been a different person, because the Indian chronicles state that he was captured and killed in India during the 1306 expedition.

== First reign ==
The situation in the Chagatai Khanate following the death of Duwa in 1307 turned volatile, with two of his successors reigning within one year and with the sons of Kaidu still hoping to regain control over the khans. By 1308 Taliqu was in charge of the khanate but his rule was quickly contested. His enemies rallied among Kebek, and they defeated and overthrew Taliqu in 1308 or 1309. As a result, Kebek became khan of the ulus.

At this point, Kaidu's sons decided to make their move against the Chagatayids. Having recently come off his war with Taliqu, Kebek found himself facing an invasion by Yangichar, Orus, Chapar and Tügme. The two sides met near Almaliq, where Kebek's forces ultimately won a pitched battle. Following this, Chapar decided to surrender to the Yuan emperor Khayisan (Emperor Wuzong), permanently ending the threat against the Chagatayids by Kaidu's sons.

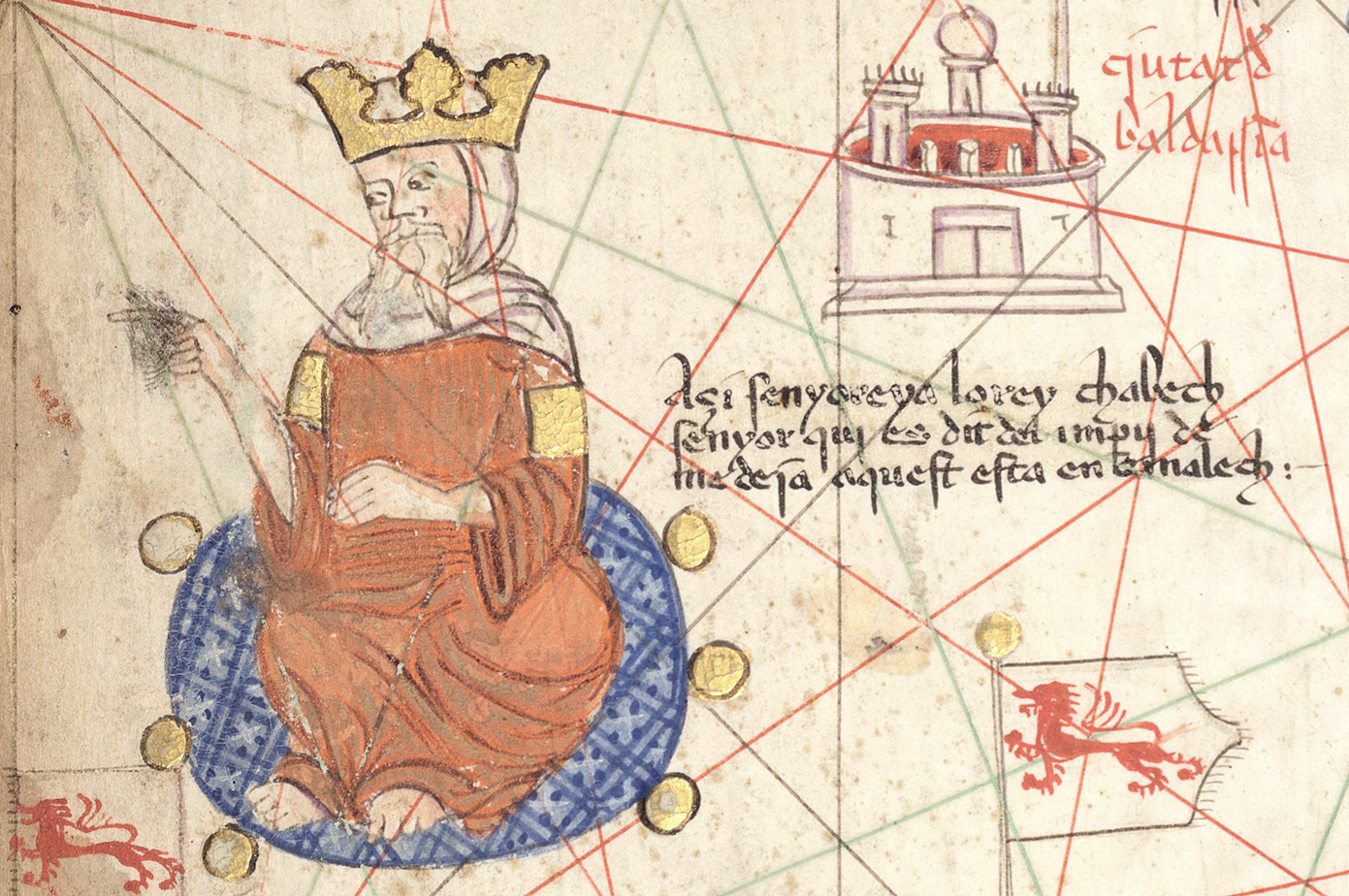
"Rey chabech", identified with Kebek Khan (1309-1326) in the Catalan Atlas, 1375.

With Yangichar and his brothers defeated, Kebek held a quriltai to decide on a future of the khanate. At the quriltai the Mongol princes agreed to recognize Kebek's brother Esen Buqa as the khan. Esen Buqa was summoned to take control of the Chagatai Khanate, and Kebek stepped down in his favor, although it was in favor of a Yuan Dynasty ruler.

== Under Esen Buqa ==
In 1314 Esen Buqa put Kebek in charge of an army that was to invade the Ilkhanate. In January, together with allied Neguderi forces, Kebek crossed the Amu Darya into Ilkhanid territory and defeated an enemy army on the Murghab. The Chagatayid army then advanced as far as Herat, but then Kebek received urgent summons from Esen Buqa, who needed help in repelling an invasion from the east by the Yuan Mongols. Soon afterwards a Chagatayid prince, Yasa'ur, defected from Kebek's side and assisted the Ilkhans in defeating the Chagatayids. As a reward, Yasa'ur was given lands in Afghanistan by the Ilkhan Öljeitü.

== Second reign ==
Esen Buqa died some time around 1320 and Kebek succeeded him as khan. One of his first acts was to move against Yasa'ur, who had unsuccessfully rebelled against the Ilkhans and was therefore in a weak position; Kebek's forces defeated and killed him in June 1320.

Kebek is known to have married two princesses from the court of the Khagan. He also sent annual tributes to the latter from 1323 onwards. Unlike his brother, Esen Buqa, Kebek avoided any conflict with the Khagan and surrendered to Gegeen Khan, Emperor Yingzong of Yuan when the border skirmish broke out in 1323.

Aside from this early conflict, Kebek's second reign was largely peaceful. The adoption of a standard coinage for the entire khanate started at the latest under Kebek; in any case he supported its use. He was also interested in establishing a capital for himself, something his nomadic predecessors had seldom done. Qarshi became the capital city of the khanate during his lifetime.

Around 1326 Kebek died and was succeeded by his brother Eljigidey.

Preceded by Taliqu	Chagatai Khan; 1309−1310	Succeeded by Esen Buqa
Preceded by Esen Buqa	Chagatai Khan; 1318−1326	Succeeded by Eljigidey
