= Taliqu =

Mongolian ruler of Central Asia

Khan of the Chagatai Khanate
- Reign: 1308–1309
- Predecessor: Könchek
- Successor: Kebek
- Died: 1309
- Father: Qadaqchi
- Mother: a Qutlugh-Khanid princess
- Religion: Sunni Islam

Taliqu (also known as Naliqo'a) was Khan of the Chagatai Khanate from 1308 to 1309. He was the son of Qadaqchi and a Qutlugh-Khanid princess of Kerman, and a grandson of Büri. Following the death of Könchek, Taliqu seized power and became Khan. As a Muslim, he attempted to convert his subjects to Islam; this move was unpopular. This, combined with resentment that he was not a descendant of Duwa, led to a revolt against his rule. His enemies selected Duwa's son Kebek to become Khan, and defeated Taliqu in battle in 1309. His supporters joined the forces of Kebek, and were instrumental in defeating the sons of Kaidu that same year.

Preceded by Könchek	Khan of Chagatai Khanate; 1308–1309	Succeeded by Kebek
