= Qazan Khan ibn Yasaur =

Khan of the Chagatai Khanate
- Reign: c. 1343 – 1346
- Predecessor: Muhammad I ibn Pulad
- Successor: Danishmandchi; Tughlugh Timur
- Died: c. 1346
- Spouse: Burla-khatun
- Issue: Saray Mulk Khanum
- House: Borjigin
- Father: Yasa'ur

Qazan (died 1346) was khan of the Chagatai Khanate from c. 1343 until his death.

== Biography ==
Qazan was the son of Yasa'ur, a Chagatayid prince who had revolted in the 1310s. Upon his accession to the throne, he attempted to increase his power within the ulus. These measures provoked the anger of the nobility, who threw their support behind Qazaghan, the amir of the Qara'unas. The two went to war in 1345; Qazan defeated Qazaghan in a battle north of the Iron Gates. Defeated and wounded, Qazaghan withdrew, but rather than giving pursuit Qazan decided to spend the winter at his palace at Qarshi, allowing Qazaghan to rebuild his forces. The next year Qazaghan again fought Qazan's army and this time defeated it; Qazan was killed during the battle.

Qazan's death marked the end of the effective power of the house of Chagatai within Transoxiana (except for a brief period from 1360 until 1363); the amirs seized control of the ulus and the khans ruled in name only. The next khan, Danishmandchi, was a puppet of Qazaghan, who became the effective leader of the ulus.

Preceded by Muhammad ibn Pulad	Khan of Chagatai Khanate; 1343–1346	Succeeded by Danishmandchi; Tughlugh Timur
