= Sher Muhammad =

Khan of Moghulistan
- Reign: 1421–1425
- Predecessor: Uwais Khan
- Successor: Uwais Khan
- Born: unknown
- Died: 1425
- House: Borjigin

Shir Muhammad Khan (Chagatai and Persian: شیر محمد خان) was a Khan of Moghulistan in 1421–1425.

Shir Muhammad Khan was the son of Muhammad Khan. Muhammad Khan had several brothers, one of whom was Shir Ali Oghlán. Shir Ali Oghlán died at the age of eighteen, and thus never attained the rank of Khán. He left one son, Uwais Khan, between whom and Shir Muhammad Khán arose great disputes. Shir Muhammad Khán, who was also a contemporary of Shah Rukh, enjoyed a longer reign than Muhammad Khán.

He was preceded by the first reign of Uwais Khan. He was followed by the second reign of Uwais Khan.

== Chagatai Khanate ==
Preceded by Uwais Khan	Moghul Khan; 1421–1425	Succeeded by Uwais Khan
