= Büri =

Mongolian prince (died 1252)

- Born: Before 1221 Mongolia
- Died: 1252 Golden Horde
- Conflicts: Mongol invasion of Europe

Büri (Mongolian: Бүри, ᠪᠦᠷᠢ, Chinese: 不里; pinyin: Bùlǐ, Chagatai: بوری, died 1252) was a son of Mutukan and a grandson of Chagatai Khan.

== Life ==
=== Under Ögedei ===
According to Rashid-al-Din Hamadani, Büri's mother was a wife of Chagatai Khan's slave. Mutukan was attracted by her beauty while she served in the Khan's ger or tent. Mutukan made her pregnant and instead of marrying her, he took her baby, Büri, who was raised by Chagatai after Mutukan's death during the Siege of Bamyan in 1221. He was characterized as a stubborn and brave person, especially when drunk.

At the kurultai in Mongolia after the end of the Mongol-Jin War, the Great Khan Ögedei ordered Batu to conquer western nations. In 1235 Batu, who earlier had directed the conquest of the Crimean Peninsula, was assigned an army of possibly 130,000 to oversee an invasion of Europe. His relatives and cousins Güyük, Büri, Möngke, Khulgen, Kadan, Baidar and notable Mongol generals Subutai, Borolday, and Mengguser joined him by the order of his uncle Ögedei. The army, actually commanded by Subutai, crossed the Volga and invaded Volga Bulgaria in 1236. Büri later joined the campaign of the winter of 1237–1238 in the first invasion against Russia. On the way back from the Novgorod region to the steppe, the contingents of Kadan and Buri moved east of the main forces, including passing through the Ryazan region a second time during the campaign. At the very beginning of May 1238, the Mongol army approached Kozelsk, which was besieged for the seventh week by the main forces and taken in three days.

In the winter of 1239–1240, Buri, along with Möngke, Güyük and Kadan, participated in the three-month siege of the city of Maghas, which ended in total destruction of the city. However Büri, Güyük and Harqasun (son of Eljigidei) soon began to make fun of Batu and insulted him. Both Güyük and Buri were recalled by Great Khan Ögedei, and Buri was sent to his grandfather Chagatai. After a year in Mongolia, he was returned to Batu to participate in the invasion of Europe.

When the Mongols advanced into Central Europe, he ravaged Wallachia. He invaded Burzenland on 31 March 1241, crushing the armies of Pousa, the Voivode of Transylvania. Further entering the territory of Kingdom of Hungary, Büri captured the town of Kumelburch 5 days later.

=== Under Töregene, Güyük and Möngke ===
He went back to Central Asia after Ögedei's death. He brought enslaved German miners and Teutonic Knights put to work in his appanage around Talas. He was present at Güyük's coronation ceremony on 24 August 1246, representing Chagatai Ulus together with Qara Hülegü, Yesü Möngke, Baidar and Yesünto'a. After Güyük's death in 1248, he sided with regent Oghul Qaimish khatun. However, he did not attend the election ceremony of new khagan Möngke. He was captured and sent to Batu by Möngke, who executed him in 1252.

== Family ==
Wives and concubines of Büri aren't known. Name of his children are also subject to debate. For example, his eldest son Qadaqai Setsen (died during second stage of Mongol conquest of Song China - 1251–60) is sometimes shows as Chagatai's own son. This list follows Boyle's version.

- Abishqa (d. 1252)
- Azhiji (d. around 1306) — Commander of Gansu and Hexi under Kublai and Temür Khan, Prince of Weiyuan (威远王)
  - Örüg
  - Örüg Temür
  - Chin Temür
  - Ershil
  - Princess Huihe (回鹘公主) — married to Öngüt prince Qiu Lincha (丘邻察)
- Qadaqai Setsen
  - Taliqu — khan (1308-1309)
    - Temür
    - Oradai
    - Tümen
  - Bughu
    - Dhul Qarnain
    - Ali
  - Buqa Temür — khan (1272–1282)
    - Örüg Temür
    - Öljei
  - Buqa
- Ahmad (d. 1270) — killed by Baraq's emir Na'uldar
  - Baba (d. 1317)
    - Habil Temür
    - Qabil Temür
    - Yulduz Temür
  - Sati
    - Töre (d. 1309) — Prince of Yue (越王)
      - Aratnashiri (c. 1331)
      - Darma (c. 1343)

== Sources ==
- Boyle, John Andrew (1971), The Successors of Genghis Khan : Translated from the Persian of Rashīd al-Dīn, Columbia University Press
- Cleaves, Francis Woodman (1982), The Secret History of the Mongols, Harvard University Press, ISBN 0674796705
- Salagean, Tudor (2016), Transylvania in the Second Half of the Thirteenth Century: The Rise of the Congregational System, BRILL

== Bibliography ==
- René Grousset. Empire of Steppes.
- Giovanni Di Plano Carpini. Story of the Mongols Whom We Call the Tartars (Translated by Erik Hildinger. ISBN 0-8283-2017-9.
