= Eljigidey =

Khan of the Chagatai Khanate from 1326 to 1329

Khan of the Chagatai Khanate
- Reign: 1326–1329
- Predecessor: Kebek
- Successor: Duwa Temür
- Died: 1329

Eljigidey was Khan of the Chagatai Khanate, a division of the Mongol Empire, from 1326 to 1329. He was the son of Duwa. After the death of his brother Kebek, Eljigidey took control of the Chagatai Khanate. He was involved in the succession struggles of the Yuan court from 1327 to 1329. His ally Kusala was enthroned as the Yuan emperor in 1329 but died in suspicious circumstances barely six months later. The new Yuan emperor, Tugh Temür, sent him Naimantai, a descendant of Muqali, in order to mollify his anger with an imperial seal. After only a short period of time, however, Eljigidey was overthrown by another brother, Duwa Temür.

== Sources ==
- "The Chaghadaids and Islam: the conversion of Tarmashirin Khan (1331-34)". The Journal of the American Oriental Society, October 1, 2002. Biran
- The Cambridge History of China By Denis Twitchett, Herbert Franke, John K. Fairbank

Preceded by Kebek	Khan of Chagatai Khanate; 1326–1329	Succeeded by Duwa Temür
