= Sultan Mahmud (Chagatai) =

Sultan Mahmud Khan

Khan of the Western Chagatai Khanate
- Reign: 1388 – 1403
- Predecessor: Soyurgatmish
- Born: unknown
- Died: 1403
- Spouse: Sa’adat Sultan
- Issue: Aqi Sultan Khanika; Abu Sa'id
- House: Borjigin
- Father: Soyurgatmish
- Religion: Islam

Sultan Mahmud Khan (Chagatai and Persian: سلطان محمود خان; died 1403) was the last Khan of the Western Chagatai Khanate (1388–1403). He was a son of Soyurgatmish.

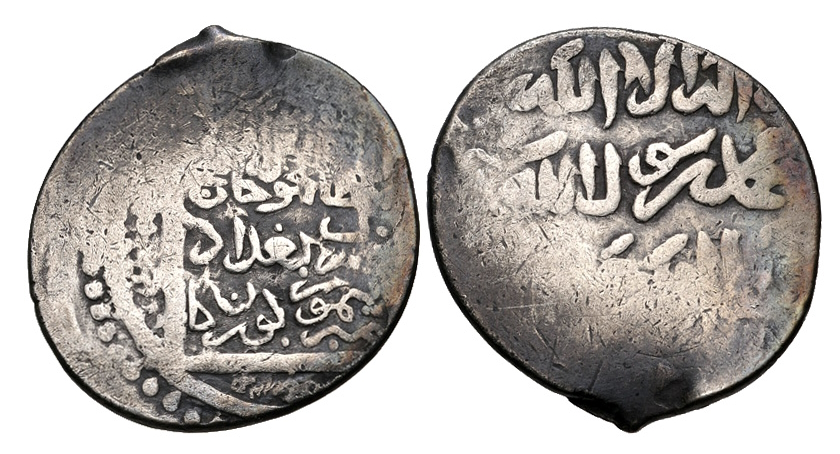
Rare coinage of Timur while occupying Jalayirid Baghdad in 1393. Citing "al-sultan Mahmud Khan", Chagatai khan Sultan Mahmud.

Upon his father's death in 1388, Sultan Mahmud was made khan by Timur, who also married Sultan Mahmud's mother. Like Soyurgatmish, Sultan Mahmud was completely powerless, and served as a puppet for Timur. Coins in his name were produced by Timur during his lifetime. Sultan Mahmud's death in 1403 marked the effective end of the line of Chagatai Khans in Transoxiana, who had long been mere figureheads anyway. Although Timur's grandson Ulugh Beg appointed khans as well, they were even less noteworthy, although one, Satuq Khan, was known for attempting to become khan of Moghulistan.

Sultan Mahmud was married to Sa’adat Sultan, Timur's granddaughter by his son Umar Shaikh Mirza I. His own daughter, Aqi Sultan Khanika, was married to Timur's grandson Ulugh Beg. Sultan Mahmud also had a son, Abu Sa'id, though the latter was overlooked by Timur as a potential successor to his father.

Preceded by Soyurgatmish	Western Chagatai Khan; 1388–1403	Succeeded by Khanate abolished
