= Könchek =

Mongolian king of Central Asia

Khan of the Chagatai Khanate
- Reign: 1307–1308
- Predecessor: Duwa
- Successor: Taliqu
- Died: 1308
- Father: Duwa

Könchek (died 1308) was Khan of the Chagatai Khanate (1307–1308). He was the son and successor of Duwa. Upon his father's death, Könchek became Khan. His reign only lasted a year, before his death in 1308.

Preceded by Duwa	Khan of Chagatai Khanate; 1307–1308	Succeeded by Taliqu
