= Negudar =

13th-century Golden Horde general under Berke

Negudar (also known as Nikudar or Neguder) was a Mongol general under Berke, and a Golden Horde Noyan. With many other Golden Horde generals, he embraced Islam in the late 13th century. He subsequently took the Muslim name of Ahmad Khan.

Before the conflicts between Berke and Hulagu, Negudar fostered peace in Eastern Khorasan and its surrounding areas in Central Asia. Neguder with other generals of the Mongol Empire raided the northwest parts of the Delhi Sultanate in the 1230s. When war hostilities broke out between Berke and Hulagu in 1260, Negudar assumed control over a sizeable portion of Berke's forces primarily in Ghazni and eastern Afghanistan.

Negudar and his forces ultimately settled in various parts of modern-day Afghanistan including Kabul and Herat. Mongols in Afghanistan adopted his name later as they merged into Chagatai Khanate during the reign of Alghu. Today, Nikudari, an archaic form of the Mongolian language extinct in Mongolia, is preserved in Afghanistan and named after Negudar.
