= Satuq Khan =

Khan of Moghulistan
- Reign: 1429–1434
- Predecessor: Uwais Khan
- Successor: Esen Buqa II
- Born: unknown
- Died: 1434
- Father: Muhammad Khan (possibly)

Satuq Khan (Uyghur, Urdu, Arabic, Persian:ستوق خان) was first a Chagatai Khan under the Timurid Empire set up as nominal Khan by Ulugh Beg and later replaced and sent in 1428 C.E. to overcome Timurid enemies, the Moghuls of Moghulistan by claiming his right as their Khan. He advanced and defeated the unprepared troops of Awais Khan in 1429 C.E. Awais Khan died while trying to cross a stream but was trapped in a quicksand and eventually struck by an arrow in confusion by his own soldier. Thus Satuq Khan became the new Moghul Khan from 1429 to 1434 C.E.

The Moghuls were in the greatest disorder though and, moreover, refused to obey Satuq Khan who was perceived as a puppet ruler of the Timurids; so that Satuq Khan could no longer remain in Moghulistan, but retired to Kashghar. The Moghuls were divided in two under either one of Awais Khan's sons, Yunus Khan and Esen Buqa II. Satuq Khan for his part was not recognized in most of the country but he did retain control of Kashgar. Here he was overpowered by the Dughlat Amir Karakul Ahmad Mirza, who was a grandson of Amir Khudaidad. Soon after this, Ulugh Beg sent an army to Kashghar. They seized Karakul Ahmad Mirza and carried him off to Samarkand, where they cut him in half. Kashgar remained under Timurid rule for a few more years, as Ulugh Beg installed several governors in the town.

Preceded by Uwais Khan	Moghul Khan; 1429–1434	Succeeded by Esen Buqa II
