= Qazaghan =

Mongolian aristocrat who ruled Central Asia

Qazaghan (died 1358) was the amir of the Qara'unas from 1345 at the latest to 1358 and was the effective ruler of the Chagatai ulus from 1346 to 1358.

Vasily Bartold wrote that Qazaghan was very likely from the Kauchin tribe; he believed that the Kauchins were a Turkicized Mongol tribe; earlier work by Bartold described Qazaghan as a Turkic emir.

Qazaghan's lineage is mostly unknown; it is possible that he became head of the Qara'unas through appointment instead of inheritance. In 1345, he rebelled against his sovereign, Qazan, the Chagatai Khan, but was defeated. The following year he tried again and succeeded in killing the khan. Qazan's death signified the end of the effective power of the Chagatai khans within the ulus; subsequent khans were rulers in name only. Qazaghan, in the interest of maintaining an image of legitimacy, contented himself with his title of amir and conferred the title of khan on descendants of Genghis Khan of his own choosing: first Danishmandchi (1346–1348) and then Bayan Qulï (1348–1358).

During the twelve years that Qazaghan served as the power behind the throne, the khanate devolved into a loose confederation of tribes that respected the overall authority of Qazaghan and his puppet khans, although he primarily commanded the loyalty of the tribes of the southern portion of the ulus. Following the example of the khans before him, Qazaghan raided northern India. He also sent several thousand troops to aid the Sultan of Delhi, Muhammad bin Tughluq, against rebels in his country in 1350 or 1351 and also supported his son Firuz Shah Tughlaq to the throne. Following complaints from the Arlat and the Arpardi tribes, who were members of the ulus, of raids by the Kartids under Mu'izzu'd-Din, Qazaghan coordinated a punitive expedition with most of the tribes of the southern part of the ulus. The coalition sacked Herat and gathered a large amount of plunder.

In 1358, Qazaghan was assassinated by the son of Borolday, who had been amir of the Qara'unas before Qazaghan. He had aroused the anger of his murderer by denying him the tumen of Borolday. He was succeeded as leader of the Qara'unas by his son, ‘Abdullah.
