= Abdullah (Chagatai Khanate) =

Mongol aristocrat in Central Asia

Abdullah (died c. 1359) was the leader of the Qara'unas (1358–1359) and the ruler of the Chagatai ulus (1358). He was the son of Amir Qazaghan.

After Qazaghan had taken control of the Chagatai ulus around 1346, he appointed Abdullah as governor of Samarkand. During his father's lifetime, Abdullah led an expedition against Khwarazm, although Qazaghan had been against it. When the latter died in 1358 Abdullah succeeded him. Unlike his father, he had an active interest in the tribes of the northern part of the ulus. Qazaghan, whose power base had been in the southern portion of the ulus, had tended to leave the northern tribes alone; Abdullah was not content to do the same. The northern tribes bitterly resented his attempts to curtail their power.

Abdullah's decision to keep his capital in Samarkand proved to be his undoing. The Barlas and Suldus tribes, both located near the city, hated the prospect of a strong Qara'unas presence in their immediate vicinity. Together the leaders of the Barlas and Suldus, Hajji Beg and Buyan Suldus, revolted and drove Abdullah out of power; he returned to the territories of the Qara'unas and died soon afterwards. The victorious parties often cited Abdullah's treatment of Bayan Quli as a pretext for their revolt. Bayan Quli had been Qazaghan's puppet khan; soon after Qazaghan's death Abdullah desired Bayan Quli's wife and had him executed. In any case, Buyan Suldus was installed as amir of the ulus, while both Abdullah's brothers and Shah Temur, who had been raised by Abdullah to the khanship following Bayan Quli's execution, were killed.
