= Soyurgatmish =

Khan of the Western Chagatai Khanate (14th century)

- Gold coin minted in Isfahan in 1384 CE, jointly bearing the names of Soyurghatmish and Timur.

Khan of the Western Chagatai Khanate
- Reign: 1370–1388
- Predecessor: Adil-Sultan
- Successor: Sultan Mahmud
- Died: 1388
- Issue: Sultan Mahmud; Urun Sultan Khanika
- Father: Danishmendji

Soyurghatmïsh Khan (died 1388) was the khan of the Western Chagatai Khanate (1370–1388). He was the son of Danishmendji, of the House of Ögedei.

When Timur gained control of the territory of the Western Chagatai Khanate in the 1370s, he did not abolish the office of Khan. Instead, in order to legitimatize his authority, he placed on the throne Soyurgatmish, who was not a member of the house of Chagatai Khan, but from the House of Ögedei. Timur ruled as an amir in Soyurgatmish's name. The Khan, however, was only a ceremonial figure, and Timur held all of the power within the state. Upon Soyurgatmish's death in 1388, he was replaced by his son Sultan Mahmud.

His daughter Urun Sultan Khanika was married to Timur's son Miran Shah.
