= Qara'unas =

Mongolic ethnic group

The Qara'unas or Negüderi were the Mongols who settled in Afghanistan after moving from Turkestan and Mongolia.

== Foundation ==
The word Qarauna derived from the Turkic word Qara meaning black in Mongolian. At first they were subjects of the Great Khan and served as tamnas or tamachis in Afghanistan. The Great Khan appointed their leaders from non-Chingisid generals such as Dayir and Mungudei. In 1238, they settled near India to face the military forces of the Delhi Sultanate. In the 1250s their leader was Sali Noyan who was of Tatar origin. Möngke Khan ordered Sali Noyan and his tamna soldiers to join Hulegu's army in 1253. In 1260, Jochid Baval, the father of Nogai Khan, was executed on the orders of Hulegu Khan after gaining permission from Berke who was the khan of the Golden Horde. Soon after that, Kuli and Tutar, also Golden Horde princes, died under suspicious circumstances. Golden Horde soldiers who served Hulegu feared for their lives and began to move to the Kipchak Steppes via Derbent while others moved through Syria to Egypt. Angered, Hulegu punished many soldiers of the Golden Horde for the defeat of Ain Jalut. The Mongol general Baiju was executed as well. To the east, the flight of Jochid troops into Afghanistan in significant numbers led to the creation of the Negudari (Nikudari) Mongols or Qara'unas in 1262. Berke ordered general Neguder to carry out raids in the eastern part of the Ilkhanate. Some historians refer to the Qara'unas as Neguderis. This term was derived from the name of Negudar.

== Mongol Empire ==
Although some scholars claim that the Qara'unas did not owe allegiance to any khanate in the 1290s, it is also claimed that the Qara'unas were largely brought under the Chagatai Khanate during the reign of Alghu in 1262. As a result of wars between the Mongol khanates, the Qara'unas deserted Hulegu and captured Sali bahadur. While a majority of Qara'unas were ruled by Chagatai princes, there was another group in Khorasan which formed the eastern border for Abagha Khan. He appointed former Chagatai Khan Mubarak Shah their leader.

Duwa recalled his cousin Abdullah and appointed his son Qutlugh Khwaja a governor there in 1299. The descendants of Duwa ruled the Qara'unas after that. Oljeitu reasserted his ancestors' claim on Afghanistan and repelled the Qara'unas in 1314. Another Chagatai prince Yasa'ur was given lands in Afghanistan by the latter Ilkhan. By his complaisance toward the Buyantu Ayurbawda Khan of the Yuan and the Ilkhan Oljeitu, Kebek reoccupied the territory peacefully. Esenbuqa and Tarmashirin were all military governors of the Qara'unas who later became Chagatai Khans. This military group had participated in all Mongol invasions of India after 1241.

== Rise to power and decline ==
Serving under the Khans, they gained confidence from them. Qara'unas were the main force for the campaigns in Persia and India. Neguderis wintered around Ghazna and summered in Ghur and Garchistan. According to Marco Polo, they were mixed with Indians and Turks, because these soldiers were unable to reach Mongolia to find Mongol wives. After the death of Qazan Khan, the Chagatai Khanate split into two parts until it was temporarily reunited under Tughlugh Timur (1347–1363). Chagatai Mongol fell under the control of semi-nomadic oboghs: the Arlat in the west, the Barlas in the center, and the Jalayir in the north, and two non-tribal military groups, the Qara'unas and the Qa'uchin.

While the Mongols in Moghulistan, the eastern part of the Chagatai Khanate, called their western counterparts in Transoxiana Qara'unas (blacks or mixed breed), the western Chagatayid called the Mongols of Moghulistan Jete (bandits). The western part of the khanate was under the control of Qara'unas such as Emir Qazaghan and his son ‘Abdullah. But Suldus and Barlas nobles revolted against their rule in 1359.

With the Mongol (Moghul) invasion in 1360, the Qarauna ascendancy failed. In 1362 Tamerlane (Temur, Timur) rejoined the Qara'unas under Qazaghan's grandson, Husayn. They freed Transoxiana from the Mongols of Moghulistan, whom they considered unruly bandits in the next year. But in 1365 the Moghuls invaded again. The Qarauna and Barlas forces were defeated.

Quickly after the Khan's fail, Timur and Husayn recovered. They co-ruled Transoxiana and installed a puppet khan. Husayn decided to build himself a permanent capital and urban base on the site of Balkh in Afghanistan and Turkestan, ruined since the time of Genghis Khan, but now to be developed as an anti-Samarkand. When the ambitious Temur finally revolted in 1370 at the head of his coalition, Husayn had little support left and was easily defeated and killed. Temur fully subjugated the Qara'unas in the 1380s.

During the reign of Temur (d.1405), Qara'unas formed a huge part of his army. According to Babur in Baburnama, they still spoke Mongolian in the mountains of Ghazni in the late 15th century.

== Modern descendants ==
Their tribal name hails from their former military leader, Negudar, who according to Morgan was a general of the Golden Horde, but according to the research of Weiers that Morgan fails to quote was a leader of rebels against Hulegu Khan.

== See also ==
- Moghol people
- Mongol invasions of India
- Chagatai Khanate
- Ilkhanate
- History of Afghanistan
