= List of khans of the Yarkent and Turpan khanates =

This is a list of Khans of the Yarkent Khanate (1514–1705) and the Turpan Khanate (1487–1660?).

== Said Khan successors in the Yarkent Khanate (1465–1759) ==
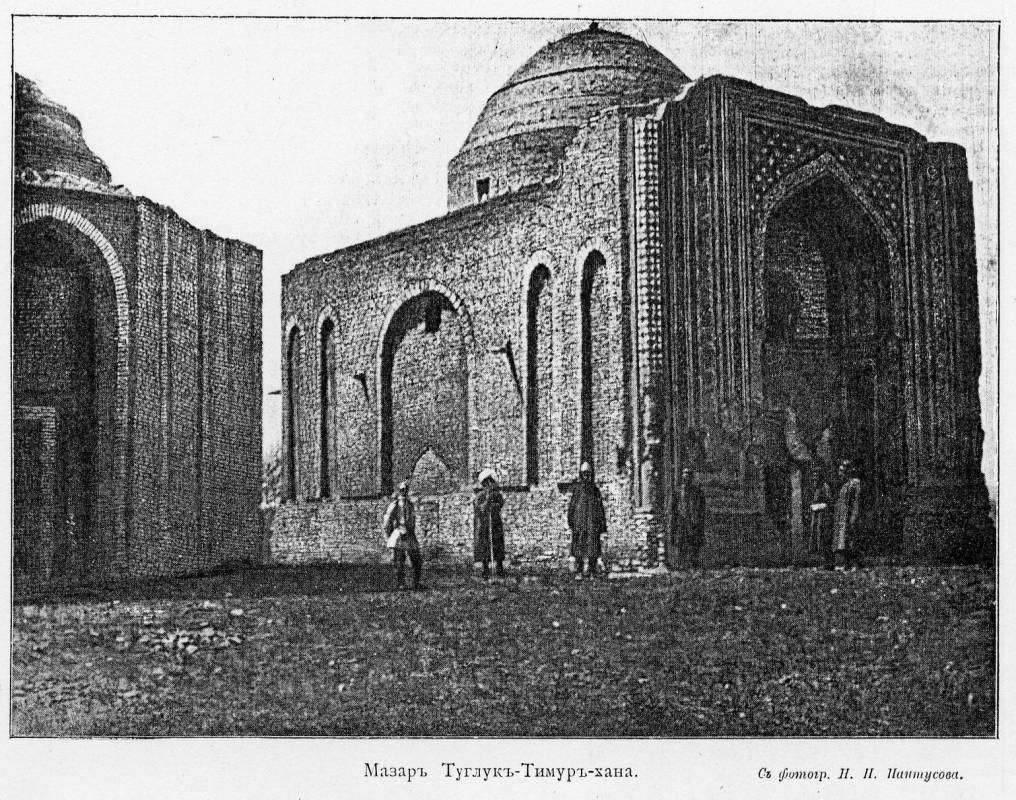
Tomb of Tughlugh Timur Khan (1347–1363), founder of Moghul Dynasty (1347–1930), in Almalik of Baghistan (Ili River Valley), near present-day Ghulja

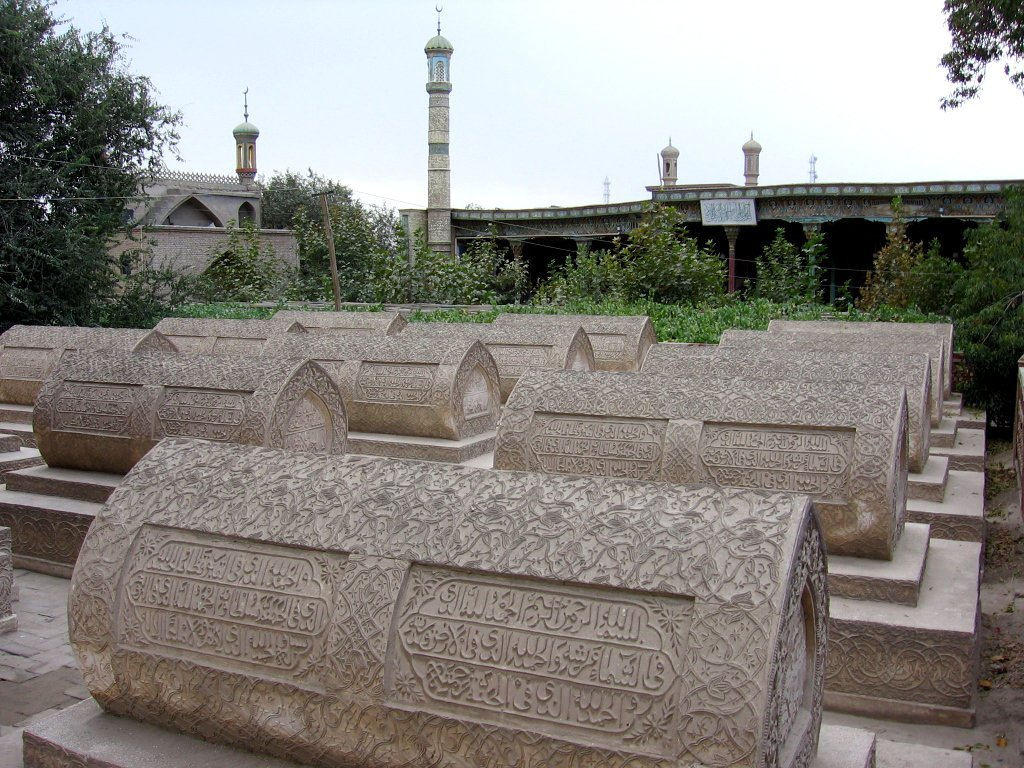
Tombs of Moghul Khans of Yarkand Khanate in royal cemetery Altyn in Yarkand

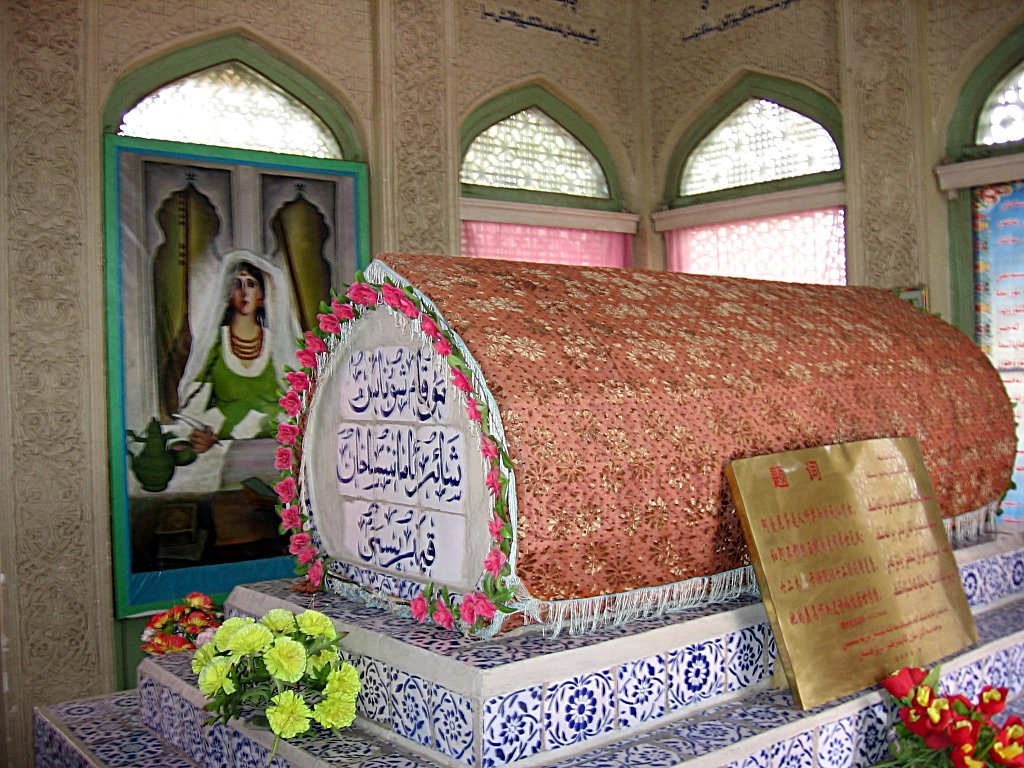
Tomb of Queen Amannisa Khan (1526–1560), wife of Abdurashid Khan, in the royal Altun cemetery in Yarkand

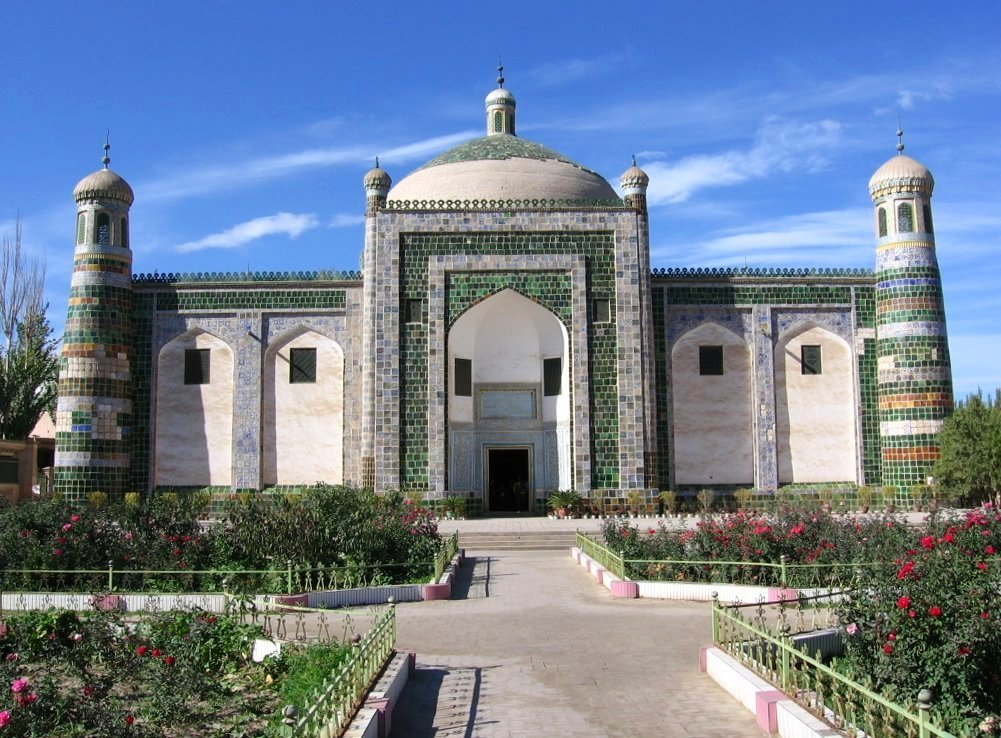
The tomb of Appak Khoja in Kashgar

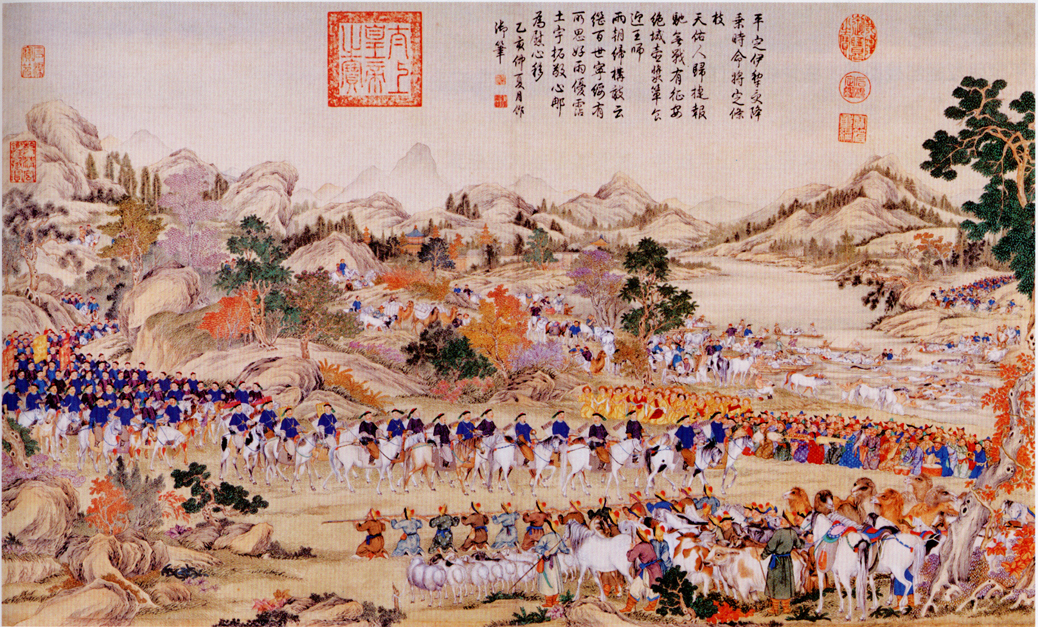
Painting of approx. 1765–1769 years, that depicts the entering of Manchu troops into Baghistan (Ili River Valley) in the spring of 1755 year

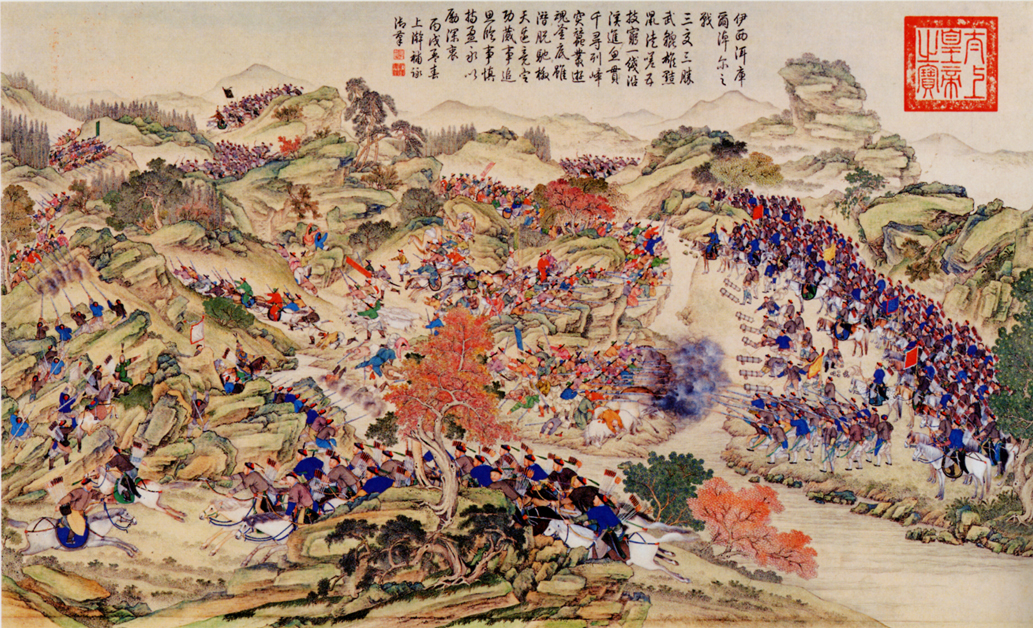
Painting of approx. 1765–1769 years, that depicts the last engagement between Ak Taghlik Khojas' Army and pursuing Manchu troops on September 02,1759 in the Pamir mountains near Lake Yashil Kul, present Badakhshan Mountainous Autonomous Region of Republic of Tajikistan

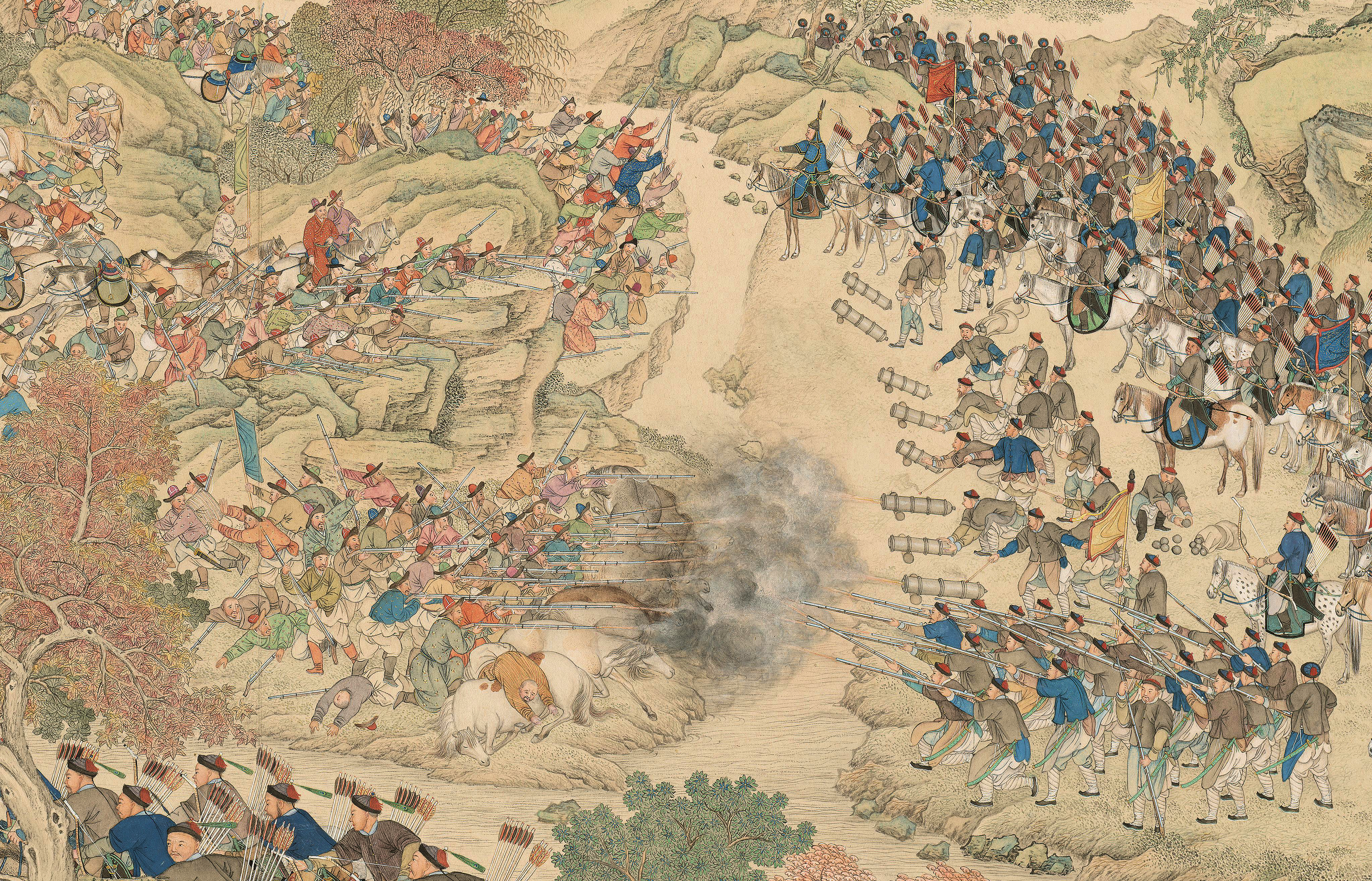
Image from the painting "Battle of Yashil-Kol "

- Abdurashid Khan (in Aksu 1521–1533) 1533–1560, son of Sultan Said Khan. Died in 1560 in the age of 52.
- Abdul Karim Khan (Yarkand) (1560–1591), second son of Abdurashid Khan. Died in 1591 in the age of 63.
- Muhammad Khan (in Turfan 1588–1591) 1591–1609, 5th son of Abdurashid Khan, in 1603 was visited in Yarkand by Portuguese Jesuit Bento de Góis, who was searching land ways from India to Ming China, headed trade mission on behalf of Moghul Emperor of India Akbar the Great and had a Letter of Safe Conduct, granted by Akbar and addressed to Muhammad Khan, with him. Died in 1609 in the age of 72.
- Shudja ad-Din Ahmad Khan (1609–1618), son of Muhammad Khan, grandson of Abdurashid Khan, was killed in 1618 during hunting.
- Kuraysh Sultan (1618), son of Yunus Sultan, grandson of Abdurashid Khan, ruled only 9 days before he was killed.
- Abd al-Latif (Afak) Khan (1618–1630), second son of Shudja ad-Din Ahmad Khan, who was only 13 when was set up on khanship, died in 1630 in the age of 25.
- Sultan Ahmad Khan (Pulat Khan) (in Aksu 1617–1630, since age of 4) 1630–1633, first son of Timur Sultan, who was the first son of Shuja ad-Din Ahmad Khan and died in 1615.
- Mahmud Sultan (Qilich Khan) (1633–1636), second son of Timur Sultan, died in the age of 22 when was poisoned in 1636 by Khoja Yahiya (died in 1646 in the age of 63), son of Khoja Ishak Wali (died in 1599 in the age of 94), founder of Ishakiyya branch of Nakshbandi Khojagan Sufi Order, followers of which were known as Kara Taghliks.
- Sultan Ahmad Khan (Pulat Khan) (1636–1638), restored on khanship with help of Kara Taghlik leader Khoja Yahiya, who was granted village Guma near Khotan by Sultan Ahmad Khan, resigned in 1638 on demands of Kashgar and Yarkand emirs in favor of Abdullah Khan, died in 1640 in the age of 27.
- Abdullah Khan (in Turfan 1634/5–1638/9) 1638–1669, the eldest son of Abduraim Khan, grandson of Abdurashid Khan. During his reign Baghistan in Ili River Valley of former Moghulistan (with tomb of Tughluk Timur Khan, founder of Moghul Dynasty in 1347, in Almalik near Ghulja) was lost to Dzungar Khan Erdeni Batur (1634–1653) in 1651, who created Dzungar Khanate in 1634 under Choros nobility, after former Confederation of 4 Kalmyk tribes (Khoit, Khoshut, Choros and Torghut ) collapsed in Dzungaria in 1628. Abdullah Khan was expelled by Kashgar and Yarkand Beks to India in 1669, where he was received by Moghul Emperor Aurangzeb, who arranged his Hajj to Mecca and provided all supplies, died on October 30, 1675, in India in the age of 67, buried in Agra.
- Nur ad-Din Sultan (in Aksu 1649–1667) 1667–1668 in Kashgar and Yengisar, the youngest son of Abdullah Khan, died in 1668 in the age of 31 due to heavy drinking, reigned one year with help of the Kara Yanchuks , mercenaries from Dzungars and Kyrgyz tribes, who were first recruited on service in Yarkand Khanate during last years of reigning of Abdullah Khan.
- Ismail Khan (in Chalish 1666–1669, in Aksu 1669–1670) 1669, the 5th son of Abduraim Khan, grandson of Abdurashid Khan, disciple of Kara Taghlik leader Khoja Ubaidullah (Khoja Shadi), son of Khoja Yahiya, was declared a Khan in Aksu after Abdullah Khan fled to India.
- Yuibars Khan (in Kashgar 1638–1667, since age of 8) 1669–1670, the eldest son of Abdullah Khan, disciple of Ak Taghlik leader Khoja Mohammad Yusuf (son of Khoja Kalon who died in 1598 and was founder of Ishkiya branch of Nakshbandi Khojagan Sufi Order, followers of which were known as Aktaghliks) and his son Appak Khoja, during his reign positions of Ak Taghliks in Yarkand Khanate greatly increased, was killed in 1670 by Dzungar supporter Erka Bek, main controller of Dzungar Khan Sengge (1653–1671) in Yarkand, in the age of 40.
- Abd al Latif Sultan (1670), son of Yulbars Khan, who was set up on khanship by Ak Taghliks, was killed in the same 1670 by Kara Taghliks with all other sons of Yulbars Khan.
- Ismail Khan (1670–1678), restored on April 2, 1670, by Kara Taghliks, expelled Appak Khoja and his son Yahia Khoja from the country in 1670, in 1678 was captured by Dzungars in Yarkand (they were invited into the country by Ak Taghlik leader Appak Khoja who used for this recommendation letter from 5th Dalai Lama with whom he met in exile), died in Ili River Valley (Baghistan) in 1680 in the age of 56.
- Abd ar-Rashid Khan II (1678–1682), the eldest son of Sultan Said Baba Khan, set up on khanship by Dzungar Galdan (1671–1697), who came to Yarkand with Appak Khoja and was rewarded by him with 4,000 pcs of fine clothes and 100,000 silver coins (tangas) for military help. In 1682, Abd ar-Rashid Khan II was sent to Ili under escort by Dzungars, who reacted on complaint of Appak.Khoja to Galdan against Abd ar-Rashid Khan II and again were generously rewarded by him. Abd ar-Rashid Khan II fled to Beijing with his son Sultan and surrendered to the Kangxi Emperor in 1696 after Galdan's collapse.
- Muhammad Imin Khan (1682–1692; 1680–1682 in Chalish, 1682 in Turfan), second son of Sultan Said Baba Khan. After his oldest brother Abd ar-Rashid Khan II was expelled, Muhammad Imin Khan was recalled from Turpan and elected a Khan on a Kurultai of Kashgar and Yarkand Begs. Organized several expeditions against Dzungars. It caused no objections from Appak Khoja, who even married Muhammad Imin Khan's sister Khanum Padshah to save his already shaken prestige and influence among population. In 1692 Muhammad Imin Khan issued State Order (Yarlik ) about expelling Appak Khoja and his son Yahiya Khoja from Yarkent Khanate. In response, Appak Khoja swore to exterminate all descendants of Chengiz Khan in the country and collected troops of his disciples. In decisive battle near Kargilik in 1692 most Muhammad Imin Khan's troops deserted him and joined Khojas. Muhammad Amin Khan fled to the mountains where he was killed.
- Appak Khoja, usurper, (1692–1694), died in 1694. In 1692 set up his regime in Yarkand and Kashgar (was declared an absolute ruler in Yarkand royal palace Altunluk with its 9 gates that led to the Hall of Reception, while his son Yahia Khoja was nominally declared a Khan) after the death of Muhammad Amin Khan, expelled Kara Taghlik leader Khoja Daniyal into Kashmir.
- Yahiya Khoja (in Kashgar 1690–1692) 1692–1695, son of Appak Khoja, set up on khanship by Appak Khoja, killed in 1695 by Hanim Padsha.
- Hanim Padsha (Khanum Padshah) (1695), sister of Muhammad Imin Khan, widow of Appak Khoja, was killed in 1695.
- Muhammad Mumin Khan (Akbash Khan) (1695–1705), the youngest son of Sultan Said Baba Khan, great-grandson of Abdurashid Khan, disciple of Kara Taghliks, recalled Kara Taghlik leader Khoja Daniyal (died in 1735) from exile in Kashmir to resist Ak Taghliks and Dzungars, fled to India in 1705 under protection of Aurangzeb of Moghul Empire.

The remnants of the state fell to two different rival branches of Khojas- Ak Taghliks and Kara Taghliks. Aqtaghlyq branch of Khojas, a confederation under the influence of the Dzungars, took power in Kashgar where Ahmad Khoja, son of Yahiya Khoja, was declared a Khan. In Yarkand Kara Taghliks took power with Khoja Daniyal being declared a Khan, that caused a civil war between Kashgar and Yarkand.

In 1713 Tsewang Rabtan captured both rivals, Khoja Daniyal and Ahmad Khoja, took them as prisoners to Ili and remnant of the Yarkent Khanate – Altishar (union of 6 cities, it included Kashgar, Yarkand, Khotan, Uchturpan, Aksu and Kucha)-became a full dependency of Dzungar Khanate under Tsewang Rabtan (1697–1727), paying annual tribute from all 6 cities in amount of one silver tanga from soul, for Yarkand it was established in amount of 100,000 silver tangas, for Kashgar-67,000 silver tangas, this time Kara Taghliks were established by Dzungars to be responsible for collecting tribute. In exchange, Tsewang Rabtan appointed Khoja Daniyal in 1720 a ruler of Altishar with obligation to deliver tribute to Dzungar capital in Kainuk (near present day Ghulja in Ili River Valley) annually in person. Next Dzungar Khan Galdan Tseren (1727–1745) confirmed rights of Khoja Daniyal, but increased tribute, as result taxes, collected by Kara Taghlik Khojas in Altishar in favor of Dzungar Khanate, reached 55% of income of peasants, artisans and traders in Altishar. Increased taxes were caused by growing military expenses of 100,000 Dzungar Army that was involved in military conflicts with all neighbors of Dzungar Khanate, including Russian troops in Siberia. In 1735 Khoja Daniyal died but his sons continued to rule Altishar on behalf of Dzungars. Khoja Jahan was ruling Yarkand (1735–1755), Khoja Yusup was ruling Kashgar (1735–1752), Khoja Abdullah was ruling Aksu, Khoja Ubaidullah was ruling Khotan. In 1752 Altishar restored its independence after revolt against Dzungar Khanate under leadership of Kara Taghlik leader Khoja Yusup, son of Khoja Daniyal. Khoja Yusup took advantage from struggle for power between Dzungar princes after death of Galdan Tseren in 1745, when 2 of his sons, middle, 13-year old Ajan (1745–1749) and eldest, Lama Darji (1749–1752), born of concubine, were killed within 7 years after short khanships and 2 nephews, Dawachi (1752–1755) and Amursana (1755–1756), came into struggle for power after that. Khoja Yusup arrested all pro-Dzungar Begs in Altishar, expelled all Dzungars from the country and stopped tribute payments to Dzungar Khanate in 1752. In May 1755 sons of Ahmad Khoja and great-grandsons of Appak Khoja, Ak Taghliks Burhan ad-Din Khoja and Jahan Khoja, were rescued by Qings troops in Ili River Valley from Dzungar's captivity (which were sent here originally by the Qianlong Emperor on demand of Amursana, who asked the Manchu emperor to aid him to overthrow Dawachi from Dzungar Khanate's reign) and sent to Altishar to claim mandate of Qing China for the country. Burhan ad-Din Khoja sent letter with ultimatum of surrender to Kara Taghlik leader Khoja Jahan, the eldest son of Khoja Daniyal, who was declared a Khan of Altishar after death of Khoja Yusup in 1755. In his letter Burhan ad-Din Khoja claimed that he was appointed a ruler of Altishar by new Dzungar Khan Amursana (previous Dzungar Khan Dawachi fled to Uchturpan after losing battle to Qing troops in Baghistan (Ili River Valley) where he was captured with his son Lodja Noyon by Burhan ad-Din Khoja's people in July 1755, then handed over to Qing troops in Ili on August 1, 1755, Qings delivered him to Beijing for imprisonment on November 20, 1755) and Amursana in turn was appointed a Dzungar Khan by the Qianlong Emperor, so Khoja Jahan must return to Amursana all taxes that Kara Taghliks collected in Altishar for several years since 1752 and beg him for his life and lives of all relatives after that. Khoja Jahan burnt out letter of Burhan ad-Din Khoja after reading it to the people during military council in the royal palace Altunluk in Yarkand and declared a total war against Ak Taghliks. Burhan ad-Din Khoja crossed Tengri tagh with 10,000 troops of mountaneers and arrived at Aksu in October 1755 which was already under control of his supporters, while his brother Jahan Khoja stayed in Baghistan, because he was retained in Ili in the headquarters of Qing Army officially as a temporary ruler of Baghistan, but actually like a hostage and managed to leave only after rebellion of Amursana against Qing troops. He didn't join Amursana in rebellion and instead destroyed and burnt out both Dzungar Buddhist temples, Golden and Silver, in Ghulja and Kainuk cities of Baghistan, that were built by Galdan Boshugtu Khan and represented a sacred symbols of Dzungar Power. Burhan ad-Din Khoja moved against Kashgar and Yarkand in November 1755 after defeating Kara Taghlik troops in the battle near Uch Turpan, he was joined by Jahan Khoja only a few months later. In the ensuing bloody war Ak Taghliks under Burhan ad-Din Khoja emerged victorious and established full control of Altishar in January 1756 but brothers refused to submit to Qings after that. They killed Qing China emissary Amintu with 100 Manchu troops in Kucha on July 2, 1757, who was sent to Altishar to determine the sizes of tribute and taxes to be paid by each city monthly and annually to Qing China and also terms of sending of peasants (Taranchis) to Ili River Valley, where headquarters of Qing Army in occupied territory of New Line (Xinjiang) were located, for cultivation of land and providing food for troops, the practice, that was previously employed by Dzungars since 1713. So, the war between Altishar and Qing China became imminent. In the end of 1759 Altishar was conquered by Qing China (with both Ak Taghlik Khojas having been killed on October 17, 1759 after fierce 2-years fighting with conquering Qing Army since spring 1758), that created province Nanlu (Southern Road) on its territory in 1760, while province Beilu (Northern Road) was created on the territory of former Dzungar Khanate, that was exterminated by Qing China during military campaigns in 1756–1757. It happened after last Dzungar Khan Amursana rebelled in October 1755 against Qing troops, which refused to leave occupied Ili River Valley, and massacred most of them, also he recognized that was deceived by the Qianlong Emperor and will never be let to rule the whole Dzungar Khanate and decided to oppose Qing plans to liquidate Dzungar Khanate with dividing Dzungaria into 4 administrative districts with separate Dzungar chieftains in each. In response, the Qianlong Emperor sent a 200,000-strong Qing army to Dzungaria in the spring of 1756 with order to quell rebellion by any means. Because resistance of Dzungars wasn't stopped and only increased, the Qianlong Emperor ordered to Military Council in Beijing on March 23, 1757, to take decisive actions against "Thieves and Criminals" and approved offer of Commander-in-chief of Qing Army in Dzungaria Zhao Hui to eliminate the whole Dzungar nation till last baby. Dzungaria was devastated during 1756–1758 with total loss of population up to 1,000 000 (40% of which fled, 30% were killed in actions and 30% died due to epidemic of smallpox, that started in 1757 and spread throughout all corners of Dzungaria), completely depopulated and later colonized by migrants from different parts of China. Amursana fled to Russia in 1757 where in the same year he died due to illness (smallpox), after that his dead body was handed over to Qings by Russian authorities.

== Ahmad Alaq successors in the Turpan Khanate (1462–1690) ==
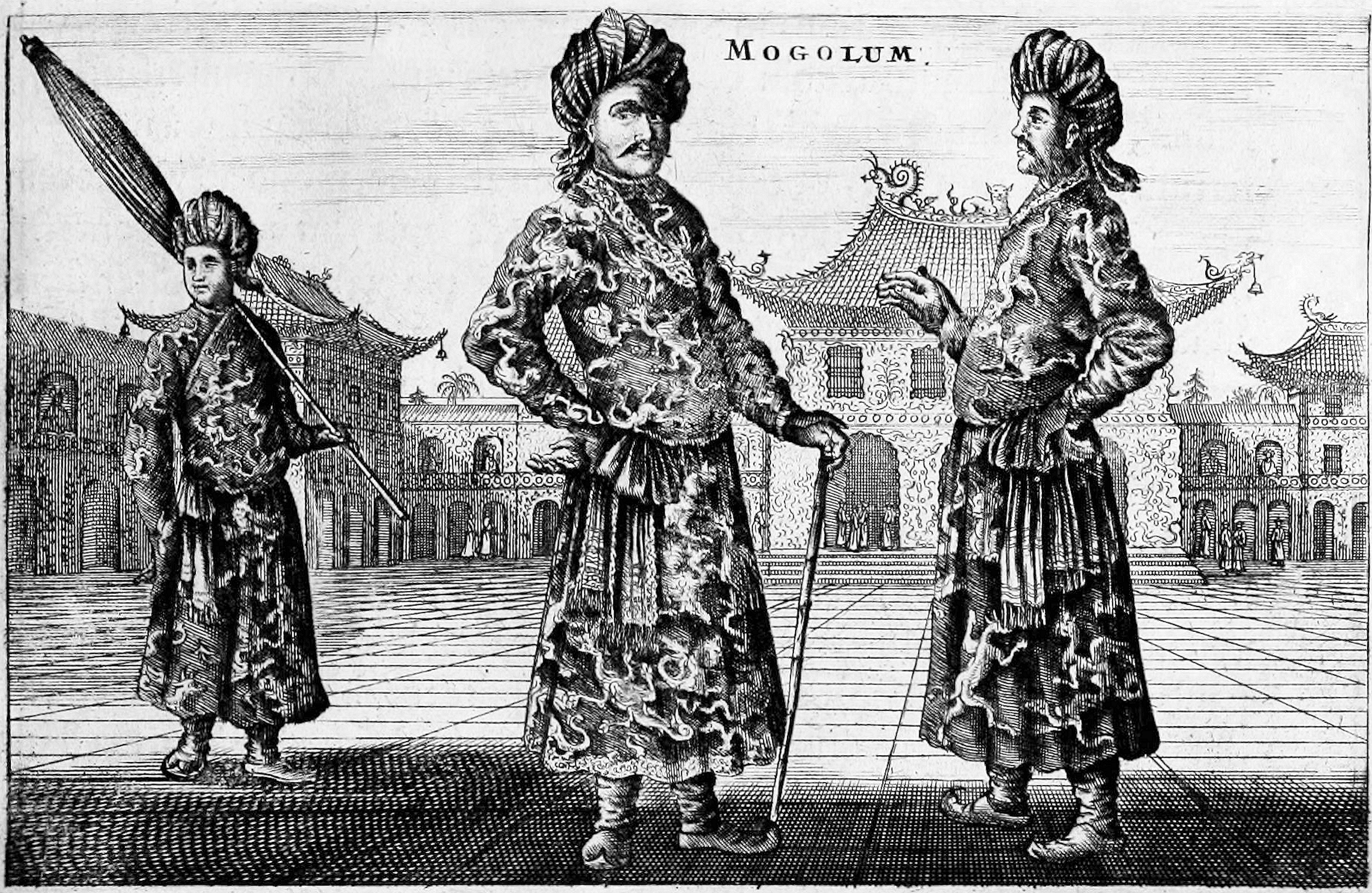
Members of Embassy from Sultan Said Baba Khan of Turpan (Uyghuristan) in 1656 in Beijing, Qing China

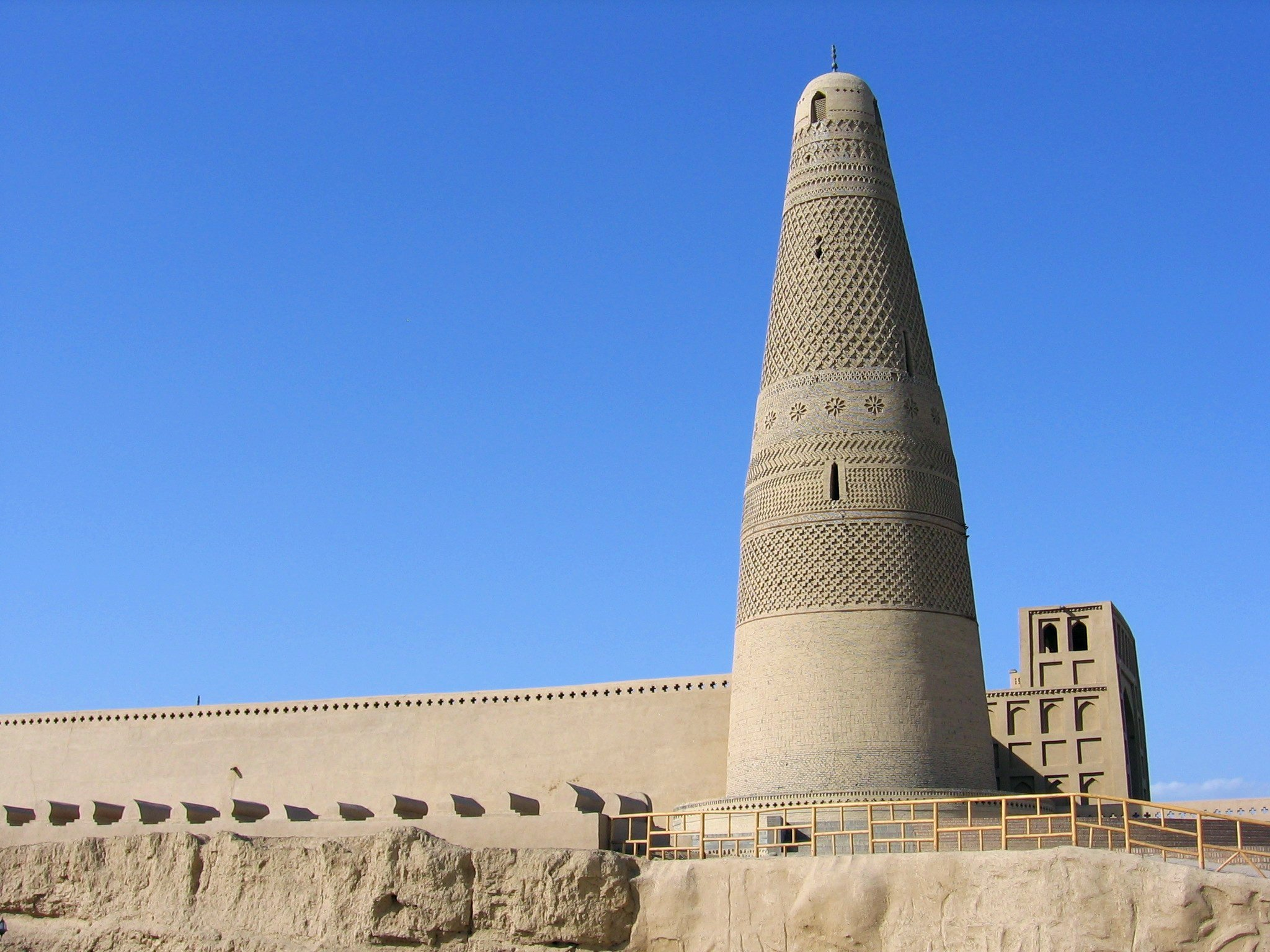
Minaret of Turpan ruler Emin Khoja, built by his son and successor Sulaiman in 1777 in the memory of his father (tallest minaret in China)

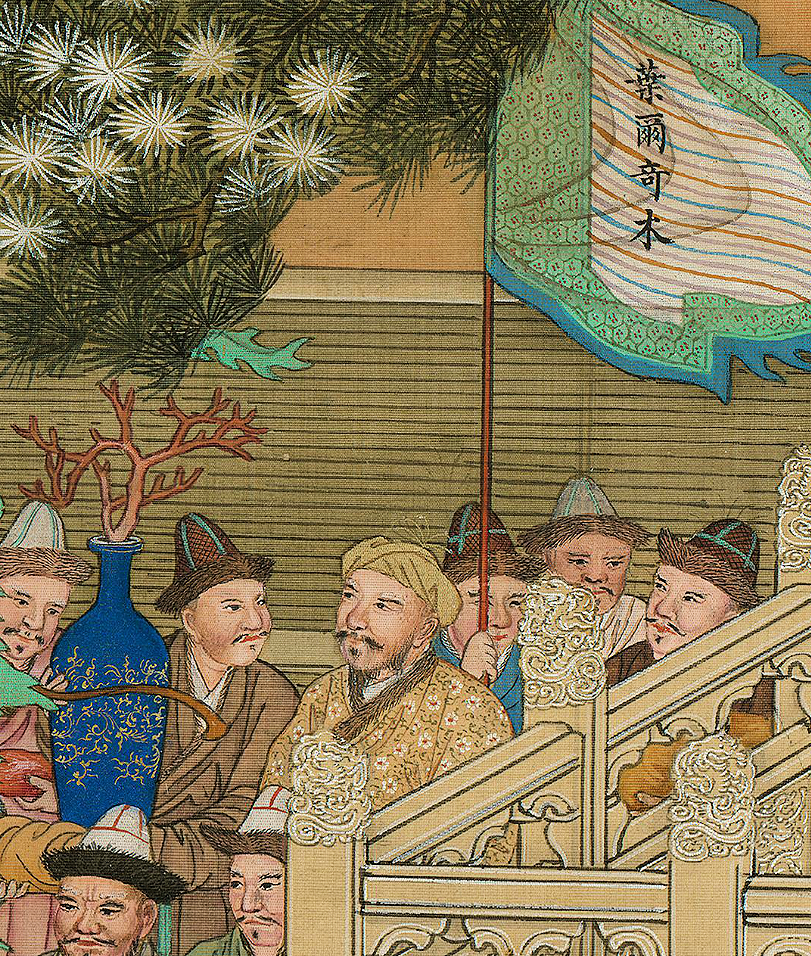
Delegates of Yarkand in Beijing in 1761 year. Painting of approx. 1765–1769 years.

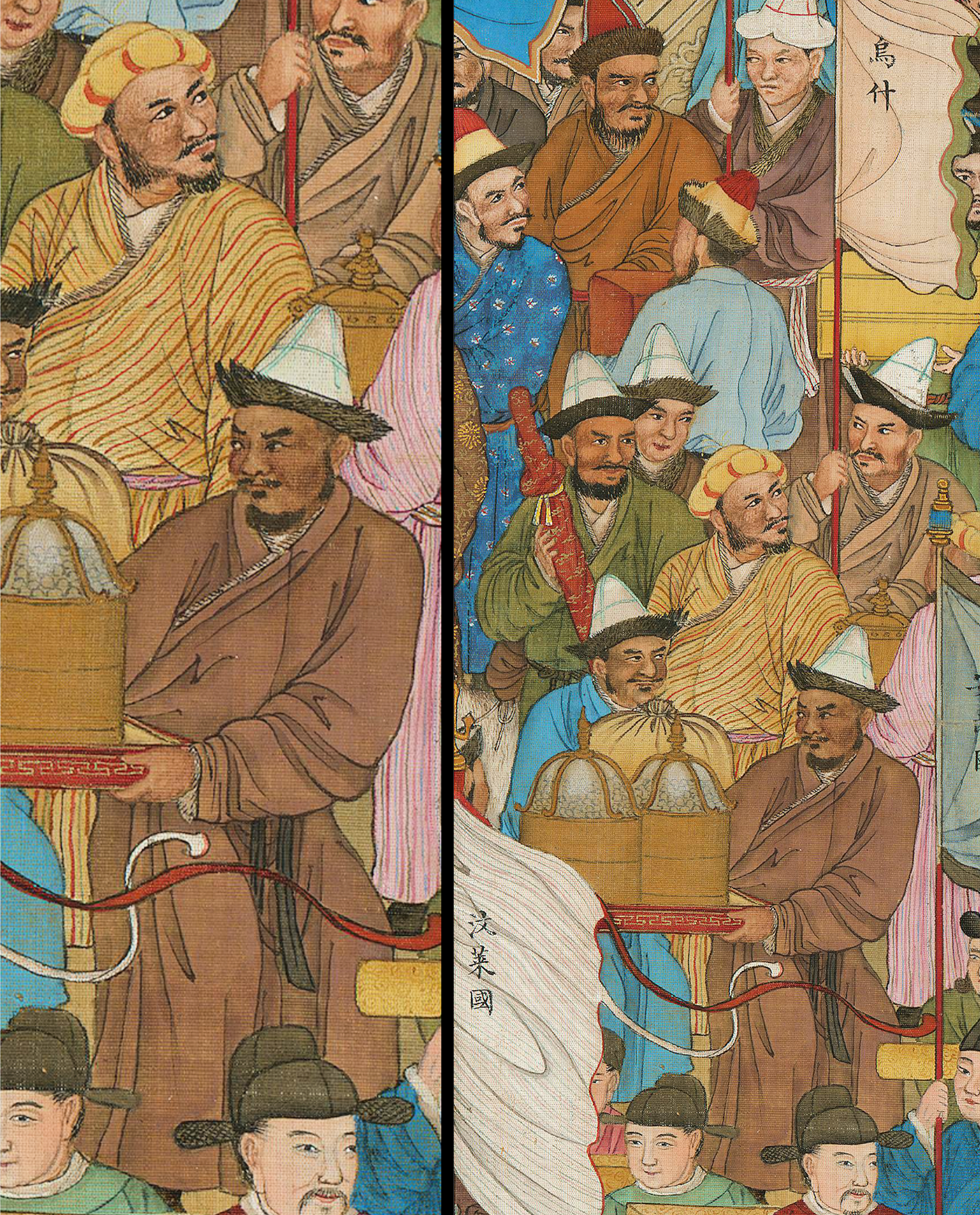
Delegates of Uchturpan in Beijing in 1761 year (bottom group). Painting of approx. 1765–1769 years.

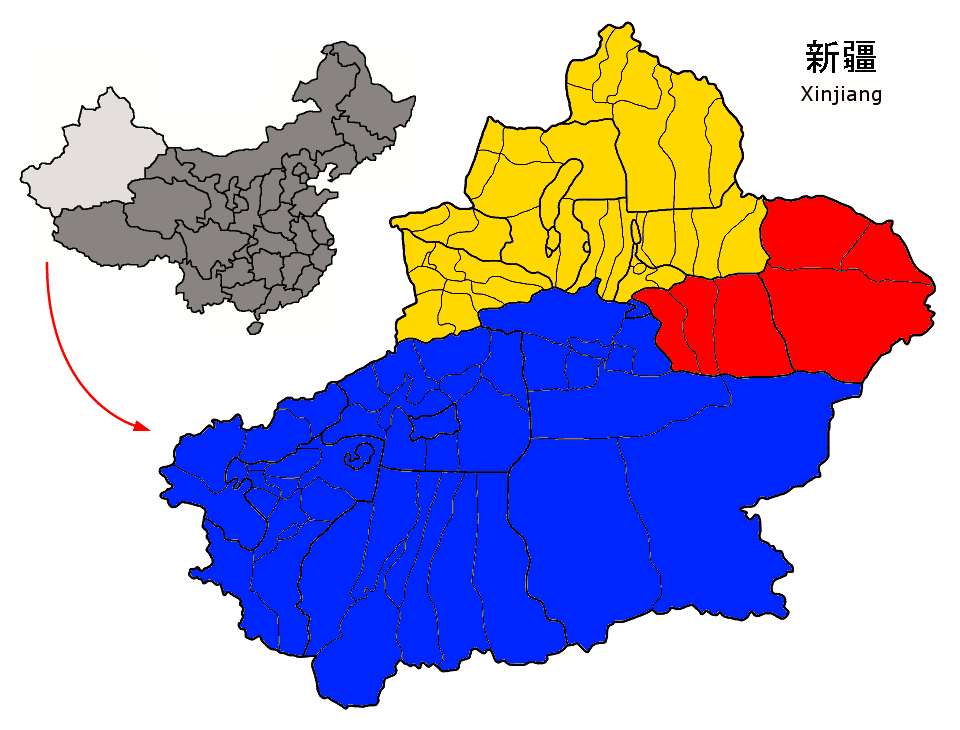
Administrative regions of established New Line 新疆 Xinjiang in the end of 1761 with Province of Beilu in Yellow, Province of Nanlu in Blue and semi-autonomous Turpan and Kumul Khanates in Red

- Mansur Khan (1503–1543), son of Ahmad Alaq
- Shah Khan (1543–1570), the eldest son of Mansur Khan
- Koraish Sultan (Khotan 1533–1570; Chalish 1570–88) 1570–1588, son of Abdurashid Khan, expelled to India in 1588 by Abdul Karim Khan, where he was received by Moghul Emperor Akbar the Great, who gave him one of regions of India in suyurgal (inheritable possession of land with all peasants on it). Died in India in 1591.
- Muhammad Khan (in Kashgaria 1591–1610), 1588–1591, son of Abdurashid Khan
- Abduraim Khan (1591–1594, 1605–1634), the youngest son of Abdurashid Khan, died in 1634 in the age of 77. Had 9 sons, eldest of them was Abdullah Khan.
- Khudabanda Sultan (1594–1605), son of Koraish Sultan, died in 1605
- Muhammad Khashim Sultan (in Chalish) 1608–1610, son of Khudabanda Sultan, grandson of Koraish Sultan, was killed in 1610 by Abduraim Khan in Kucha.
- Abdullah Khan (in Chalish, in Kashgaria 1638–1669) 1634–1638, the eldest son of Abduraim Khan.
- Abu'l Muhammad Khan (1638–1653), son of Abduraim Khan. In 1646 sent an embassy to Beijing to congratulate the newly proclaimed Manchu Shunzhi Emperor as first Emperor of the Qing dynasty of China, that succeeded the Ming dynasty, which was overthrown by Manchus in 1644. Embassy brought dozens of horses, camels and precision jade stones as a gift to the emperor. In accordance with ancient Chinese tradition it was declared as a Tribute from Vassal of China. In 1646 Turpan was granted by Qing China the rights to trade in the capital Beijing and in the city of Lanzhou, capital of Gansu province.
- Sultan Said Baba Khan (in Kumul 1636–1653) 1653, died in 1680 in the age of 53, 4th son of Abduraim Khan
- Ibrahim Sultan (in Khotan 1638–1653) 1653–1655, son of Abduraim Khan, was killed in 1655
- Sultan Said Baba Khan (restored; 1655–1680). In 1656 sent an embassy to Qing China with gifts for the Shunzhi Emperor, who accepted them and issued an imperial order on October 19, 1656, concerning trade regulations with Turpan, and sent back with mission 338 pieces of silk garment and 723 rolls of fine silk as a gift to Turpan ruler.
- Abd ar-Rashid Khan II (in Chalish 1678–1680) 1680–1682, the eldest son of Sultan Said Baba Khan, was captured in 1682 by Dzungars and held in captivity for 14 years, was rescued in 1696 by the Kangxi Emperor's Qing troops, who launched military operations against Dzungar Galdan Boshugtu Khan in Khalkha region and defeated him here in June 1696. Abdurashid Khan II was interrogated by Qings and gave them clues about Dzungar Khan's capture, explaining that he could to flee to Kukunor only through Turpan and Kumul, which supplied his troops with food. Qings contacted ruler of Kumul Ubaidullah Khan (?–1709), he captured son of Galdan Boshugtu Khan Tsewang Baljir, who came to Kumul for food, and handed over to Qings. Galdan Boshugtu Khan died of illness in 1697, his dead body was captured by Ubaidullah Khan as well and handed over to Qings. The Kangxi Emperor rewarded Abdurashid Khan II and Ubaidullah Khan for active participating in the operation for liquidating of Galdan Boshugtu Khan, Abdurashid Khan II was given permit to return to his homeland, while his son Sultan was retained in Beijing as actual hostage. Ubaidullah Khan was given the title of Jasak prince with his existing title of Tarkhan being confirmed (exemption from taxation and punishment until committing of 10th crime), the seal, imperial silk clothes and silver money, that was declared by Qings as incorporating of Kumul Khanate into Qing China. Son of Ubaidullah Khan Gapur Bek was appointed as assistant of Commander-in-chief of Qing troops in Suzhou, Gansu province, with permanent residence in this city that actually meant taking him as a hostage by Qings.
- Muhammad Imin Khan (1682–1690), second son of Sultan Said Baba Khan, great-grandson of Abdurashid Khan. In 1682 sent an embassy to Qing China with gifts for the Kangxi Emperor. In his letter to the Kangxi Emperor, Muhammad Imin Khan apologized for delay of Tribute from Turpan, that was caused by recent turmoil in the country. The Kangxi Emperor accepted gifts and gave recommendation to replace horses for Jade in Tribute (with compensation of 300 rolls of fine silk for 100 Tael (about 3.78 kg) of Jade). Embassy from Turpan was accompanied by Envoy from Kashgar Islam Khoja who informed the Kangxi Emperor of recent Dzungar invasion and asked some help against Galdan Boshugtu Khan, but result of negotiations is unknown.

Annexed by the Dzungars. After exterminating of Dzungar Khanate by Qing China in 1756–1757, remnants of Dynasty survived in semi-autonomous Kumul Khanate (1696–1930) till the 20th century, last ruler of which Maqsud Shah died in 1930. In 1720 Qing troops temporarily occupied Turpan region during offensive against Dzungar Khan Tsewang Rabtan in Tibet in attempt to cut off communications of Dzungars between Tibet and Dzungaria itself. On August 13, 1720, Qing troops entered Pichan, on August 20, 1720, entered Turpan and on October 9, 1720, came to Urumchi. While local ruler Emin Khoja greeted Qing troops, other-Aziz Khoja, supported Dzungars and left Turpan with part of population, relocating them to Uchturpan and Aksu of Altishar. Next year Qing troops were forced to leave Turpan, although the Kangxi Emperor (1661–1722) tried to send reinforcements to this region. They came back only in 1755 when the Qianlong Emperor (1735–1796) managed to solve task of neutralizing of Dzungars. Emin Khoja of Turpan joined Qing troops and aided them in military campaigns against Dzungars in 1756–1757 years and Ak Taghlik Khojas in Altishar in 1758–1759 years. In January 1758, the Qianlong Emperor ordered Emin Khoja to capture region of Chalish near Turpan and create a food base here for arriving Qing troops, that planned to start offensive against Altishar on spring. On February 2, 1758, 6 days before beginning of Chinese new lunar year of Tiger (February 8, 1758), Emin Khoja troops and accompanied Qings troops of Aligun took Kurla, Karashar was taken several days before. Nevertheless, military campaign of 1758 was devastating for Qing Army that suffered heavy casualties in the first battles with Khojas' Army. On summer Qing Army for 3 months was unable to take Kucha, which was surrounded from 3 sides by high clay city walls, that were reinforced with willow branches, while rear of the city was defended by the mountain. Artillery fire was ineffective against the clay walls and couldn't breach them, so tunnel was dug under the walls. When job was almost finished defenders of Kucha noticed the lights from the underground at night and dug pit on the rear of tunnel, then set up fire. 600 Qing soldiers in tunnel died of smoke due to suffocation, but finally city was abandoned by its defenders due to lack of supplies. In November 1758 Qing Army was surrounded by Ak Taghlik Khojas' Army near Yarkand on the Karasu river and hardly avoided full annihilation by narrowly escaping the trap in February 1759. Commander-in-chief of Qing Army Zhao Hui was wounded during escape. Contrary, campaign of summer 1759 was successful for Qing Army due to wide use of artillery, that Army of Khojas didn't have. On August 6, 1759, Qing Army took Kashgar and next day Yarkand. Ak Taghlik Khojas, brothers Burhan ad-Din Khoja and Jahan Khoja, retreated to Badakhshan where they were killed by killers, sent by Qings, on October 17, 1759. On December 23, 1759, the Qianlong Emperor declared that the military operation against Altishar is completed (after delivering the head of Jahan Khoja to Beijing, the grave of Burhan ad-Din Khoja and his body were found by Qings in Badakhshan near village Argu, present Afghanistan, only in 1763) and New Line 新疆 (Xinjiang) on the West was successfully created. Emin Khoja was left as semi-autonomous ruler of Turpan and later appointed as ruler of Yarkand in the newly-created province of Nan-lu (Southern Road) in 1760, while ruler of Kumul Yusup Khoja was sent to rule Kashgar in 1760. Their sons and brothers were appointed by Qings as a local rulers, Beks (together with Kara Taghlik Beks, who supported Qings), in different cities and towns of conquered Altishar, that was divided into 8 administrative districts: Kashgar, Yarkand, Yengihissar, Khotan, Uchturpan, Aksu, Kucha and Karashar (Chalish) of province " Nanlu Bachen" or "Union of 8 cities on Southern Road". By September 1761, total 31 Hakim Beks were appointed in the cities and towns of former Altishar to collect taxes, who monthly and annually delivered them to Qing Military Coverner of New Line 新疆 (Xinjiang) in Ili River Valley in Dzungaria, the practice, that copied that of the former Dzungar Khans (including regular sending of peasants, Taranchis, to cultivate lands in Ili to harvest crops for troops), who were finally annihilated, but were very soon replaced by the new Conqueror-Qing China.

== Bibliography ==
- Kutlukov M. About foundation of Yarkant Khanate (1465–1759), "Pan" publishing house. Almata, 1990.
- Kutlukov M. International relations in Central Asia between 1755–1759 years , "Fan" publishing house. Tashkent, 1987.
- Shah Mahmud Churas’ Chronicles (written in 1670 in Yarkand in 118 chapters). Translation and research by Akimushkin O.F. Publishing house of eastern literature "Nauka". Moscow, 1976.
- Makhmud ibn Vali Bahr al-Asrar (Sea of mysteries ). Written in 1641–1644 in Balkh in 7 volumes. Translation and research by B.Akhmedov. Publishing house "Fan" of Academy of Sciences of UzSSR, Tashkent, 1977
- Muhammad Imin Sadr Kashgari Asar al-Futuh (Traces of Invasion ), written between 1780–1790 in Samarkand by exiled author, original manuscript (never published ) was being kept in the Institute of Oriental Studies of Academy of Sciences of UzSSR, Tashkent, under Inventory No.753
- The History of the Khojas of Eastern Turkestan, summarised from the "Tazkire-i-Khojagan" of Muhammad Sadiq Kashgari (written by author in 1768–1769) by the late R.B. Shaw, edited with introduction and notes by W.Elias, published as supplement to the Journal of the Asiatic Soc. of Bengal, vol LXVI, t.1, Calcutta, 1897
- Baumer, Christoph (2018). History of Central Asia, The: 4-volume set. Bloomsbury Publishing. ISBN 978-1838608675.

== See also ==
- List of Chagatai khans
- Moghulistan
