= Dzungar conquest of Altishahr =

Conquest of Yarkent Khanate by the Dzungar Khanate

Date	1678–1680
Location	Tarim Basin, (Altishahr), Xinjiang, China
Result	Dzungar victory
Territorial changes	Altishahr (Tarim Basin) annexed by Dzungar Khanate

Belligerents
Dzungar Khanate (Yarkent Khanate) Turfan Khanate (Yarkent Khanate) Kumul Khanate	Yarkent Khanate

Commanders and leaders
(Dzungar Khanate) Galdan Boshugtu Khan (Tibet) 5th Dalai Lama (Yarkent Khanate) Afaq Khoja	(Yarkent Khanate) Ismā'il Khan (POW) (Yarkent Khanate) Prince Bābak Sultān †

Strength
120,000	Unknown

Casualties and losses
Unknown	Unknown

The Dzungar conquest of Altishahr resulted in the Oirat led Dzungar Khanate in Dzungaria conquering and subjugating the Genghisid-ruled Yarkent Khanate in Altishahr (the Tarim Basin in southern Xinjiang). It put a final end to the independence of the Yarkent Khanate (the last Chagatai successor state).

== Prelude ==
Altishahr, referring to the southern Tarim Basin, was the core territory of the Chagatai Yarkent Khanate. By the mid-17th century, the Khanate, resisted the rising Oirat power Uunder Abdull ̄ah Khan, beating back Oirat inroads into the Khotan region and Aksu. The pressure from the Oirats began to increase in Abdull ̄ah Khan's later years, under the Dzungar khong taiji, Sengge (1653–71). A bitter battle between Sengge and Abdull ̄ahKhan ended in a truce; but the Dzungars now began to encouragec Abdull ̄ah's son Yolb ̄arsto rebel against him.

== Conquest ==
The Naqshbandi Sufi Khojas, descendants of the Prophet Muhammad, had replaced the Chagatayid Khans as the ruling authority of the Tarim Basin in the early 17th century. There was a struggle between two factions of Khojas, the Afaqi (White Mountain) faction and the Ishaqi (Black Mountain) faction.

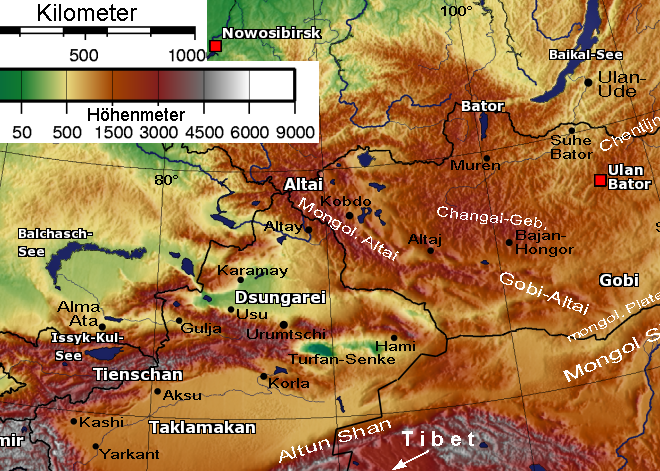
Physical map showing the separation of Dzungaria and the Tarim Basin by the Tian Shan

In 1678, Ismail Khan drives out to the Aq Taghliq Khoja of Afaq Khoja, seeking assistance from the 5th Dalai Lama, who in turn writes a letter to the Dzungar Khanate's leader Galdan Boshugtu to intervene on his behalf.

After reaching his letter, Galdan had moved to the cities of Hami and Turpan, capturing or sieging the cities by 1679. Later the following year Galdan led 120,000 Dzungar cavalry into the Tarim basin, advancing through Aksu and Uch- Turfan, Kashghar, Yarkand and Khotan killing Ismail's family and establishing Abd ar-Rashid Khan II as the regional ruler.The 5th Dalai Lama received war spoils from the Dzungar Khan Galdan which were seized from the Muslims. The Muslims were called "heretics" by them.

== Aftermath ==
After Galdan had occupied Yarkand, he did not hand over power to Afaq Khoja, who had rendered outstanding service to him, but appointed one of the members of the old Chaghatay family, Abdu'l Rash ̄ıd Khan II, son of B ̄ab ̄a Khan of Turfan, as khan and made him his vassal. He then led his troops back to the north of the Tian Shan attacking the Kazakh Khanate. Tensions soon arose between Abdu'l Rash ̄ıd Khan and Afaq Khoja, however, with the latter fleeing the region once again. In 1682 riots erupted in Yarkand and Abdu'l Rash ̄ıd Khan fled to Ili; his younger brother Muhammad Am ̄ın was thereupon established as khan.

=== Chagatai rebellion (1693–1705) ===
Muhammad sought help from the Qing dynasty, Khanate of Bukhara, and the Mughal Empire in combating the Dzungars. In 1693, Muhammad conducted a successful attack on the Dzungar Khanate, taking 30,000 captives. Unfortunately Afaq Khoja appeared again and overthrew Muhammad in a revolt led by his followers. Afaq's son Yahiya Khoja was enthroned but his reign was cut short in 1695 when both he and his father were killed while suppressing local rebellions. In 1696, Akbash Khan was placed on the throne, but the begs of Kashgar refused to recognize him, and instead allied with the Kyrgyz to attack Yarkand, taking Akbash prisoner. The begs of Yarkand went to the Dzungars, who sent troops and ousted the Kyrgyz in 1705. The Dzungars installed a non-Chagatayid ruler Mirza Alim Shah Beg, thereby ending the rule of Chagatai khans forever. Abdullah Tarkhan Beg of Hami also rebelled in 1696 and defected to the Qing dynasty.

== Bibliography ==
- Bellér-Hann, Ildikó, ed. (2007). Situating the Uyghurs Between China and Central Asia (illustrated ed.). Ashgate Publishing, Ltd. ISBN 978-0754670414. ISSN 1759-5290.
- Dani, Ahmad Hasan; Masson, Vadim Mikhaĭlovich, eds. (2003). History of Civilizations of Central Asia: Development in contrast : from the sixteenth to the mid-nineteenth century. Multiple history series. Vol. 5 of History of Civilizations of Central Asia (illustrated ed.). UNESCO. ISBN 9231038761.
- Kim, Kwangmin (2008). Saintly Brokers: Uyghur Muslims, Trade, and the Making of Qing Central Asia, 1696--1814. University of California, Berkeley. ISBN 978-1109101263. Archived from the original on 4 December 2016.
- Millward, James A. (2007). Eurasian Crossroads: A History of Xinjiang (illustrated ed.). Columbia University Press. ISBN 978-0231139243.
- Newby, L. J. (1998). "The Begs of Xinjiang: Between Two Worlds". Bulletin of the School of Oriental and African Studies, University of London. 61 (2). Cambridge University Press on behalf of School of Oriental and African Studies: 278–297. doi:10.1017/s0041977x00013811. JSTOR 3107653.
- Starr, S. Frederick, ed. (2004). Xinjiang: China's Muslim Borderland (illustrated ed.). M.E. Sharpe. ISBN 0765613182.
