= Abdallah (Moghul Khan) =

Abdullah Khan (Chagatai and Persian: عبدالله خان; in Turfan 1634/5-1638/9) 1638–1669, was the eldest of 9 sons of Abduraim Khan, grandson of Abdurashid Khan.

== Khan ==
According to the local source " Tarih-i Kashgar ", written by anonymous author of the first half of XVIII century on Uyghur language in Yarkand, he was born from Qalmak wife of Abduraim Khan Begim Pasha, daughter of Dzungar chieftain Duranga, and when he was 8 years old he was taken to Kucha and was raised here by a ruler of Kucha Mirza Abul-Hadi Beg. Mirza Abul-Hadi Beg married him on his eldest daughter, Yulbars Khan ( Moghul Khan ) and Arslan Khan were their sons. In 1634 Abdullah Khan became a ruler of Uyghurstan (Chalish-Turpan-Kumul) after the death of Abduraim Khan and thus took position of a Little Khan of Yarkand Khanate, previously held by Abduraim Khan (1591-1594,1605-1634). Soon, he repelled attack of Sultan Ahmad Khan( Pulat Khan ) (1630-1633, 1636-1638) on Kucha and in revenge managed to take Aksu from Mahmud Sultan (Qilich Khan) (1633-1636), Great Khan of Yarkand. This caused a civil war between a Little Khan , sitting in Turpan and a Great Khan , sitting in Yarkand of Yarkand Khanate. In 1636 Qilich Khan was poisoned by Kara Taghlik leader Khoja Yahiya who brought Sultan Ahmad Khan back to power as a Great Khan in Yarkand. In 1638 Khoja Yahiya decided to get rid of Sultan Ahmad Khan (Pulat Khan) as well and invited Abdullah Khan to attack Kashgar and Yarkand. Although Abdullah Khan failed to take these cities by force, the Council or Kurultai of Kashgar and Yarkand Begs forced Sultan Ahmad Khan to resign and leave the country to Balkh. in the same year Abdullah Khan came to Yarkand and was declared a Great Khan of the Yarkand Khanate in the royal Palace Altunluk , with its gorgeous 9 gates which led to the Hall of Receptions. He ruled Yarkand Khanate for about 30 years. During his reign he allowed the tribes of Kyrgyz to enter Yarkand Khanate, who settled in the mountains around Kashgar, and started to recruit mercenaries from Kyrgyz and Dzungar tribes, these mercenaries were called Kara Yanchuks .

During his reign Dzungars started to make a regular incursions into Yarkand Khanate and in 1657 Dzungar Khan Sengge (1653-1671) with a title Khong Tayiji led himself one of these incursions, reaching Keriya in support of the uprising of Sarig Uyghurs or Yellow Uyghurs of Buddhist Yellow religion in Cherchen and Charklik on the southern rim of Takla Makan Desert. To quell this uprising Abdullah Khan sent numerous troops under command of his Atalik Muhammad Mumin Sultan that suppressed uprising with a big difficulty and extreme cruelty. When news about Sengge arrival at Keriya reached Yarkand, Abdullah Khan sent from Yarkand and Khotan 10,000 troops and soon followed himself being accompanied by Yulbars Sultan with troops from Kashgar. Upon approaching of these troops Sengge left Keriya by the main road on direction of Niya, but Abdullah Khan troops reached Niya faster by the little-known and used auxiliary road and blocked Sengge's retreat, forcing him to start battle in the place that had name Yalgiz-Agach. Being surrounded from all sides Sengge made three fruitless attacks to escape from the trap but the battle completed with a truce that Abdullah Khan made with Sengge allowing him to leave without harm. In this battle forces of mercenaries, Kara Yanchuks, were actively used and after that battle they started to play a considerable role in the all internal power struggles between Begs and Sultans of the Yarkand Khanate.

Abdullah Khan failed to consolidate Yarkand Khanate, prevent its disintegration and stop separatism of Begs and Sultans, who used in power struggles between them not only Kara Yanchuk mercenaries, but powerful religious leaders, Khojas, of both rival sections, Kara Taghliks and Ak Taghliks, as well. During his rule Baghistan ( Country of Gardens) in Ili River Valley was lost to Dzungars in 1651 to the first Dzungar Khan Erdeni Batur, founder of Dzungar Khanate (1634-1755), who was granted the title Khong Tayiji by the 5th Dalai Lama. In the end of his rule entire Moghulistan, north of Tengri Tagh, was lost to Dzungars. He lost control of the East of the Yarkand Khanate, his brothers Abu'l Muhammad Khan and Ibrahim Sultan ruled Uyghurstan (Chalish-Turpan-Kumul) independently from him as a Little Khans , having own system of Taxation, while regions of Eastern Kashgaria: Uch Turpan, Aksu, Bai, Kucha had become actually a self-governed cities, ruled by Begs. Power of Abdullah Khan had become restricted only by the 6 cities of Western Kashgaria: Yarkand, Kashgar, Khotan, Kargalik, Yangi Hisar, Barchuk and Sarikol area of Pamir, nevertheless, these six cities with suburbs and related towns counted for about 70% of total population of Yarkand Khanate and provided main source of income to the Treasury of Great Khan in Yarkand, while eastern areas of the Khanate were under constant pressure from Dzungars and spent considerable amount of their resources for local defenses. Abdullah's eldest son Yulbars Sultan (Yulbars Khan) actively supported leaders of Ak Taghliks, Muhammad Yusup Khoja (died in 1640, his mausoleum is known as a Tomb of Appak Khoja) and his son Appak Khoja. Yulbars Sultan married his aunt, Shah-Zada Mahim, daughter of Mirza Abul-Hadi Beg of Kucha, to Appak Khoja and became his disciple. Yulbars Sultan ruled Kashgar for 30 years from the age of 8 since 1638 and having made alliance with Appak Khoja and by establishing friendly relations with Dzungar Khan Sengge openly challenged his father Abdullah Khan, intending to replace him as a Great Khan in Yarkand. As result, Kashgar became a center of opposition to Abdullah Khan, who in turn, was supported by Kara Taghlik leaders Khoja Yahia and Khoja Ubaidullah (son of Khoja Yahia), and by another son Nur ad-Din Sultan, who recruited vast number of mercenaries, Kara Yanchuks, that were actively used for political killings of opponents by all rival sides. This put Yarkand Khanate, actually, into the state of a civil war, just prior of Dzungar Invasions of 1670 and 1678 years.

== Exile ==
Abdullah Khan was expelled to India by the decision of Council (Kurultai) of Kashgar and Yarkand Begs in 1669. Mughal emperor of India Muhammad Aurangzeb (1658-1707) sent his Envoy Khoja Ishak to meet Moghul Khan, who arranged his passage through Karakorum Range. Abdullah Khan, accompanied by Envoy, came to Baltistan and then to Kashmir where he was received by Kashmir ruler Mubariz Khan with a big respect and favors. Mubariz Khan accompanied Abdullah Khan to Lahor and from hence they proceed to Jahan- Abad where Aurangzeb sent his Atalik, Jafar Khan, and under the guidance of Atalik Abdullah Khan met with Aurangzeb, who received him with a big respect and attention. Abdullah Khan talked about his desire to make Hajj to Mecca, which Aurangzeb arranged and he provided Khan with all supplies. Abdullah Khan departed to Mecca by sea and after completing Hajj he returned to India where he died in 1675 in the age of 67, buried in Agra.

== Aftermath ==
After Abdullah Khan left to India with his family and close relatives, many of his former supporters among Begs and Emirs, fearing Yulbars Khan, fled to Aksu, where Kara Taghlik leader Khoja Ubaidullah also arrived. They sent delegation to Ismail Sultan, 5th son of Abduraim Khan, who was a ruler of Chalish in the Eastern part of Yarkand Khanate (Uyghurstan), inviting him to Aksu. Ismail Sultan immediately arrived, he was accompanied by Dzungar chieftain Eldan Tayiji, Dzungars didn't miss this opportunity to increase their influence in the Yarkand Khanate. In Aksu, Ismail Sultan was raised on a white felt and declared a Great Khan (Chong Khan or Khaqan-i-Azam) by Emirs, Begs and Kara Taghlik leader Khoja Ubaidullah. After that Ismail Khan led local troops of Aksu, Uch Turpan, Chalish and Dzungar troops of Elpa, son of Eldan Tayiji, to Yarkand, but they were too late. Yulbars Khan, accompanied by Appak Khoja, leader of Ak Taghliks, already came to Yarkand where he was declared a Great Khan. Ismail Khan was unable to take Yarkand fortress and returned back to Aksu.

Yulbars Khan started his rule by the ordering to kill all family members of Begs and Emirs who fled to Aksu to Ismail Khan, including children and women, supporters of Kara Taghlik leader Khoja Ubaidullah were killed as well. Yulbars Khan also appealed to Dzungar Khan Sengge and invited him to attack Ismail Khan. Sengge laid siege to Aksu and Uch Turpan, but was unable to take them, also Eldan Tayiji assisted Ismail Khan against Sengge. Sengge troops were also attacked by the so-called Nyuiguts, nomads, who lived in the mountains around Aksu. Nevertheless, Dzungar Khan Sengge was able to appoint his active supporter Erka Beg as his main controller in Yarkand in 1670. Yulbars Khan retired to Kashgar only after one year of ruling and, by demand of Sengge, declared his youngest son, Abdal Latif Sultan, a Great Khan of Yarkand. Since that time Dzungars became actively involved in the civil war in Yarkand Khanate, taking advantage of the hate between Ak Taghlik and Kara Taghlik Khoja leaders, while Yarkand Khans, descendants of Chagatai Khan and Tughluk Timur Khan, were reduced just to a position of puppets in this struggle between two rival Sufi Order Islamic religious sects.

== Sources ==
- M.Kutlukov About foundation of Yarkand State (1465-1759) Pan Publishing house, Alma Ata, 1990
- Shah Mahmud Churas Chronicles (written in 1670 in Yarkand) Translation and research by Akimushkin O.F. Publishing house of Eastern literature " Nauka", Moscow, 1976

== See also ==
- List of Chagatai Khans
