= Chagatai =

Chagatai may refer to:

- Chagatai Khan, the second son of Genghis Khan
  - Chagatai Khanate, an area of the Mongol Empire initially ruled by Chagatai Khan
  - Chagatai Khans, leaders of the Chagatai Khanate from 1227 to 1687, see List of Chagatai Khans
  - Moghulistan, a breakaway kingdom from the Khanate ruled by the same family
- Chagatai language, an extinct Turkic language once widely spoken in central Asia
- Chagatai people, also known as Chagatai Tajiks. The origin of the people is unknown, though the name is from Chagatai Khan
- Chughtai, a family name in Asia and the Middle East

== See also ==
- Chagatai Turks (disambiguation)
- Çağatay, a Turkish name
- Joghatai, a municipality in Razavi Khorasan, Iran
- Jaghatu (disambiguation)
