= Çağatay =

Çağatay is a Turkish masculine name. It is also used as a family name.

Chagatai Khan (Çağatay Han in Turkish) was a son of Genghis Khan. Chagatai ruled the Chagatai Khanate from 1226 to 1242 C.E.

== Given name ==
- Akif Çağatay Kılıç (born 1976), Turkish politician and government minister
- Çağatay Ulusoy (born 1990), Turkish model and actor

== Surname ==
- Ali Rıfat Çağatay (1867–1935), Turkish composer
- Cafer Çağatay (1899–1991), Turkish footballer
- Ergun Çağatay, Turkish photojournalist
- Mustafa Çağatay, former prime minister of Turkish Republic of Northern Cyprus

== See also ==
- Chagatai (disambiguation)
- Chughtai, further information
- Kagatay (disambiguation)
