= Akbash Khan =

Akbash Khan (Chagatai: اقباش خان literally White Head Khan), born Muhammad Mumin (Chagatai and Persian: محمد مؤمن) of the Yarkent Khanate was a Central Asian Khan in the beginning of 18th century. He was the last Khan of Yarkent Khanate. He is known as one of the "later Chagatai princes" (察合台後王) in China.

== Origin ==
Akbash Khan's name was Muhammad Mumin. He descended from the second son of Genghis Khan, Chagatai. He was a member of the Borjigin clan by blood. His father was Said Baba Khan of Eastern Khanate (Uyghurstan) and his grandfather was Ismail Khan. He had two brothers who were also at one point Khans of Yarkent Khanate (Abd ar-Rashid Khan II and Muhammad Imin Khan respectively).

== Reign ==
In 1678, Galdan Boshugtu Khan of Dzungar invaded Yarkent Khanate on the invitation of Afak Khoja, who previously was exiled from the country by Ismail Khan, conquered eastern part of Yarkent Khanate, captured Ismail Khan in Yarkand and set up Abd ar-Rashid Khan II as a puppet. Instead of Afaq Khoja of the Naqshbandi order, Galdan appointed Rashid. This arrangement of power caused the later conflicts between the Moghuls and Khojas.

Akbash was never supposed to inherit the title of Khan since his brothers were already ruling Yarkand Khanate. However, Abd ar-Rashid was captured by Oirats upon complaint of Afaq Khoja and Muhammad Imin died during the conflict with Afaq Khoja. Afaq then set his son Yahya Khoja as the Khan of Yarkent Khanate in 1692. In 1694, Afaq Khoja was poisoned and died. His son Yahya also died of Oirat riots. Muhammad Imin's sister Khanum Padshah took power in 1695 but was killed in the same year.

After these incidents, Akbash was the only legitimate successor of the title of Khan. In 1695, he was installed as a Khan by Yarkent Begs. On the other hand, Begs in Kashgar had different ideas, they invited Kirghiz tribes and installed Akbash's son Mahmud as a Khan. Kashgar and Kirghiz joint forces attacked Yarkent and captured it, making Akbash a captive. The Yarkent Begs sought the help of Oirats. The Oirats successfully took back Yarkent city but Akbash lost his title permanently.

During his reign, Akbash Khan was not able to effectively control the city of Kashgar since most of the followers of Afaq Khoja were centered in Kashgar. His influence was limited in Yarkent and the cities that lie eastward.
