= Kagate =

Kagate or Kagatay may refer to:

- Kagate people, a Tibetan people of Nepal, Sikkim (India), Tibet (China)
- Kagate language, their language

== See also ==
- Kyirong–Kagate languages
- Çağatay
