= Altishahr =

Name for the Tarim Basin region

Uyghur name
- Uyghur: ئالتە شەھەر
Transcriptions
- Latin Yëziqi: Alte Sheher
- Siril Yëziqi: Алтә-шәһәр
- Uyghur IPA: [ɑltʰǽ‿ɕæhǽɚ̯]

Altishahr (Uyghur: ئالتە شەھەر, old alphabet: آلتی شهر) is a historical name for the Tarim Basin region used in the 18th and 19th centuries. The term means 'Six Cities' in Turkic languages, referring to oasis towns along the rim of the Tarim, including Kashgar, in what is now southern Xinjiang Uyghur Autonomous Region of China.

== Etymology ==
The name Altishahr is derived from the Turkic word Alti ('Six') and Persian word shahr ('city'). The Altishahr term was used by Turkic-speaking inhabitants of the Tarim Basin in the 18th and 19th century, and adopted by some Western sources in the 19th century.

Other local words for the region included Dorben Shahr ('Four Cities') and Yeti Shahr ('Seven Cities'). Another Western term for the same region is Kashgaria. Qing sources refer to the region primarily as Nanlu, or the 'Southern Circuit'. Other Qing terms for the region include Huijiang (回疆, the 'Muslim Frontier'), Huibu (回部, the 'Muslim Region'), Bacheng (the 'Eight Cities'), or Nanjiang ('Southern Frontier').

=== Onomatology ===
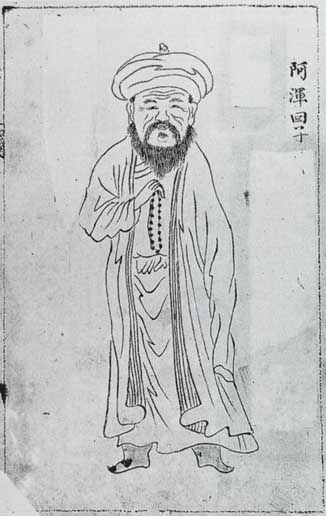
Painting depicting a Turkic Muslim from Altishahr, during the reign of the Qing dynasty.

In the 18th century, prior to the Qing conquest of Xinjiang in 1759, the oasis towns around the Tarim did not have a single political structure governing them, and Altishahr referred to the region in general rather than any cities in particular. Foreign visitors to the region would attempt to identify the cities, offering various lists.

According to Albert von Le Coq, the 'Six Cities' (Altishahr) referred to (1) Kashgar; (2) Maralbexi (Maralbashi, Bachu); (3) Aksu (Aqsu), alternatively Kargilik (Yecheng); (4) Yengisar (Yengi Hisar); (5) Yarkant (Yarkand, Shache); and (6) Khotan. W. Barthold later replaced Yengisar with Kucha (Kuqa). According to Aurel Stein, in the early 20th century, Qing administrators used the term to describe the oasis towns around Khotan, including Khotan itself, along with (2) Yurungqash, (3) Karakax (Qaraqash, Moyu), (4) Qira (Chira, Cele), (5) Keriya (Yutian), and a sixth undocumented place.

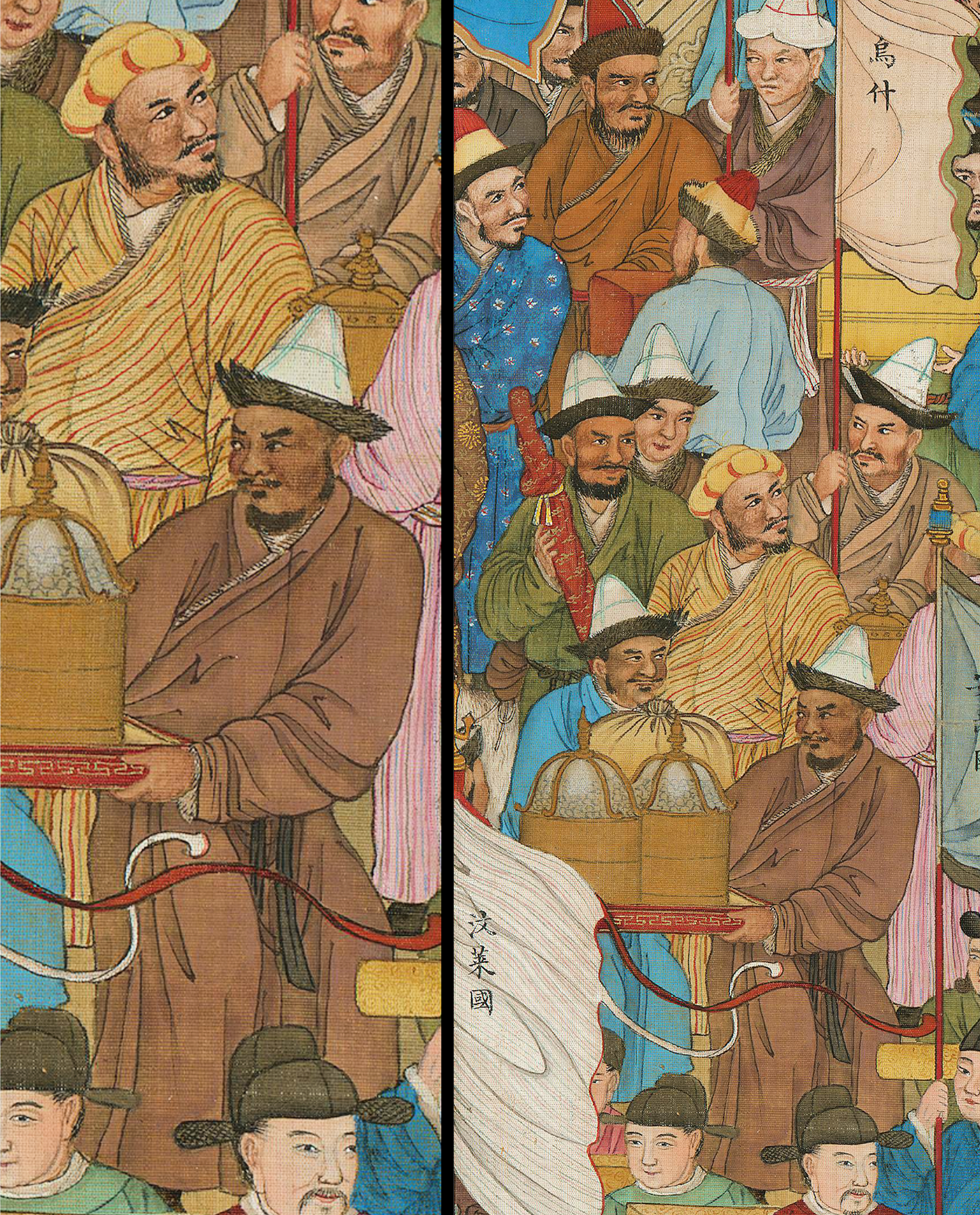
Uqturpan delegates (flag "乌什") in Beijing in 1761. From the painting Ten Thousand Nations Coming to Pay Tribute.

The term 'Seven Cities' may have been used after Yaqub Beg captured Turpan (Turfan), and referred to (1) Kashgar; (2) Yarkant; (3) Khotan; (4) Uqturpan (Uch Turfan); (5) Aksu; (6) Kucha; and (7) Turpan.

The term 'Eight Cities' (Uyghur Cyrillic: Шәкиз Шәһәр, Şäkiz Şähār) may have been a Turkic translation of the Qing Chinese term Nanlu Bajiang (literally 'Eight Cities of the Southern Circuit'), referring to (1) Kashgar, (2) Yengisar (3) Yarkant and (4) Khotan in the west and (5) Uqturpan, (6) Aksu, (7) Karasahr (Qarashahr, Yanqi), and (8) Turpan in the east.

== Geography and relation to Xinjiang ==
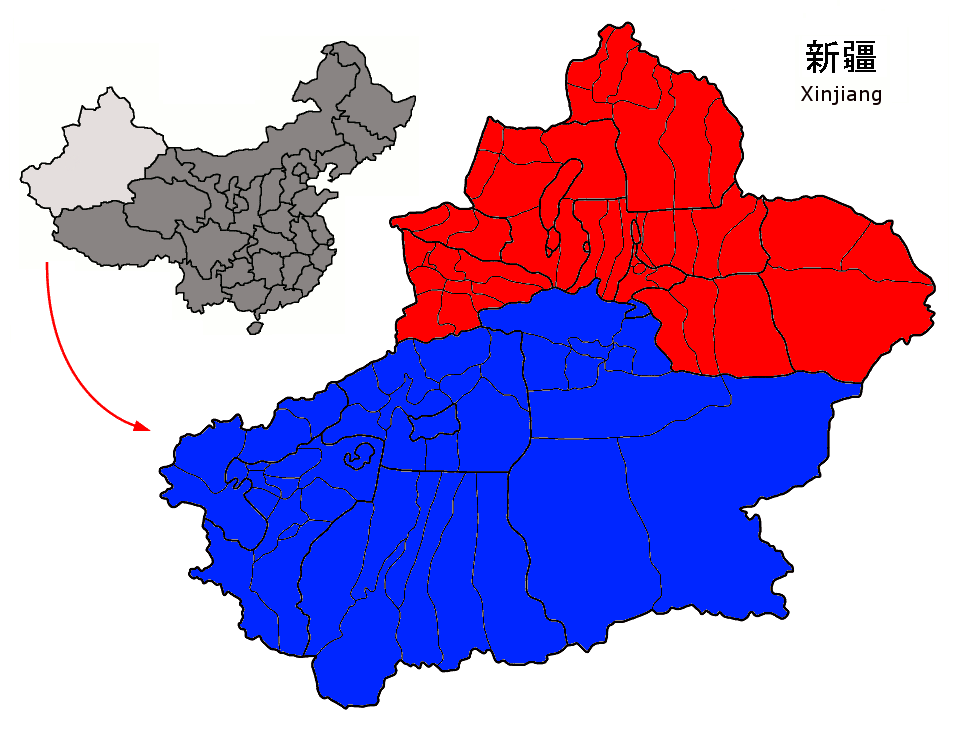
Dzungaria (Red) and the Tarim Basin (Blue)

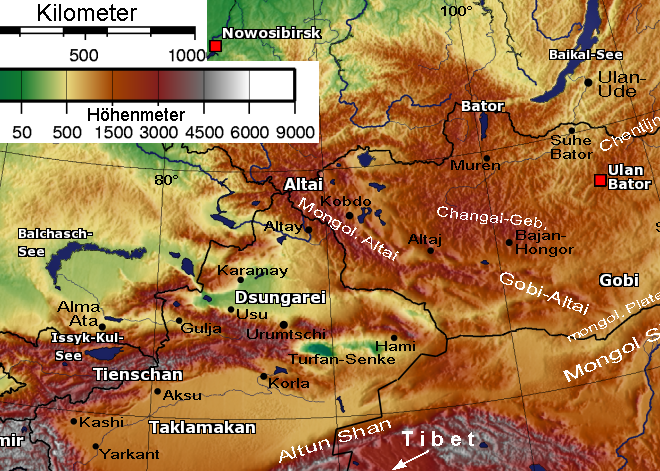
Physical map showing the separation of Dzungaria and the Tarim Basin (Taklamakan) by the Tian Shan Mountains

Altishahr refers to the Tarim Basin of Southern Xinjiang, which was historically, geographically, and ethnically distinct from the Junggar Basin of Dzungaria. At the time of the Qing conquest in 1759, Dzungaria was inhabited by Oirats, steppe-dwelling, nomadic Mongols who practiced Tibetan Buddhism. In contrast, the Tarim Basin was inhabited by sedentary, oasis-dwelling, Turkic-speaking Muslim farmers, now known as the Uyghurs. The two regions were governed as separate circuits before the region became independent. Xinjiang was made into a single province in 1884.

== History ==
Until the 8th century AD, much of the Tarim Basin was inhabited by Tocharians who spoke an Indo-European language and built city states in the oases along the rim of the Taklamakan Desert. The collapse of the Uyghur Khanate in modern Mongolia and settlement of Uyghur diaspora in the Tarim led to the prevalence of the Turkic languages. During the reign of the Karakhanids much of the region converted to Islam. From the 13th to the 16th centuries, the western Tarim was part of the larger Muslim Turkic-Mongol Chaghatay, Timurid and Eastern Chagatai Empires.

In the 17th century, the local Yarkent Khanate ruled Altishahr until its conquest by the Buddhist Dzungars from the Dzungarian Basin to the north. In the 1750s, the region was acquired by the Qing dynasty in its conquest of the Dzungar Khanate. The Qing initially administered the Dzungaria and Altishahar separately as the Northern and Southern Circuits of Tian Shan, respectively, although both were under control of the General of Ili. The Southern Circuit (Tianshan Nanlu) was also known as Huibu (回部, 'Muslim Region'), Huijiang (回疆, 'Muslim Frontier'), Chinese Turkestan, Kashgaria, Little Bukharia, and East Turkestan. After quelling the Dungan Revolt in the late 19th century, the Qing combined the two circuits into the newly created Xinjiang Province in 1884. Xinjiang has since been used by the Republic of China and People's Republic of China and Southern Xinjiang replaced Altishahr as place name for the region.

== See also ==
- Xinjiang
- Dzungaria
- East Turkestan
- Chinese Turkestan
- Southern Xinjiang
- Taklamakan Desert
- Yettishar
- Oasis of Bukhara
