= Muhammad Amin Khan =

Muhammad Amin Khan (Chagatai and Persian: محمد امین خان) was Khan of Turpan from 1682 to 1694. He was the younger brother of Abd ar-Rashid Khan II and the grandson of Ismail Khan (Moghul khan).

== Revival of the Khanship ==
Muhammad Amin Khan tried to re-established his authority as khan and sought external support. He twice sent tribute to the Qing government in the name of khan of Turpan, and sent an embassy to the Mughal Court in India in 1690. The next year he dispatched an embassy to Subhan Quli, the Uzbek Khan of Bukhara (1680–1720), seeking help against "Qyrgyz infidels" (meaning the DzungarsAltais), who "had acquired dominance over the country".

== War against the Dzungars ==
In 1693-94 Muhammad Amin Khan led an expedition against Yining, the Dzungar capital, capturing over 30,000 Kalmyks and Oirats.

== Death ==
The Khan was overthrown and killed during a revolt by Afaq Khoja's followers in 1694. Afaq khoja's son Yahya Khoja took the throne but the rule of the White Mountain Khoja lasted for only two years. Afaq Khoja and his son were both killed in succession during local rebellions.
