= Jaghatu =

Jaghatu may refer to:

- Jaghatu, a Hazara tribe
- Jaghatu District, Ghazni, Afghanistan
- Jaghatu District, Maidan Wardak, Afghanistan
- Jaghatu river or Zarrineh river, a river in Iran
