= Ergun Çağatay =

Turkish photographer and photo-journalist

Ergun Çağatay was a Turkish photographer and photojournalist of international renown. A professional photo-reporter working freelance for major international news agencies, his life changed dramatically when he was badly wounded in 1983 during the ASALA attack on the Turkish Airlines counter at the Orly airport outside of Paris. His later growing interest in Central Asia led to his publishing Turkic-Speaking Peoples: 1500 Years of Art And Culture from Inner Asia to the Balkans in 2006.

== Early life ==
Çağatay was born in İzmir on 15 January 1937 to Nazif Çağatay, a lawyer and later senator from the Republican People's Party and his wife Kamran, a housewife. He studied at Robert College in Istanbul from the age of eleven onwards, and upon graduation entered the Faculty of Law at Istanbul University at the instigation of his father, although he himself wished to study painting. Nevertheless, deciding he did not wish to practice law, he got a job in an advertising firm in 1964, working as a "copywriter"; and, a short time later, in response to an advertisement, found himself embarked on what would be a lifetime career for him: journalism. From 1968 onwards, he complemented his reporting with photography, and worked as a photojournalist for the Associated Press, and later, from 1974 onwards, for the Gamma Agency in Paris. His articles and photographs started being published in major international magazines. In 1981 and 1982, he worked for the Time/Life magazine group in New York City. His photograph of a liver transplant made the Life cover. Back in Istanbul after that, he worked freelance for the Turkish press as well international news agencies, and his busy schedule required frequent traveling.

== Near-fatal bomb ==
It was during what he thought was just another international trip, as he waited at Paris's Orly Airport on 15 July 1983 with the other 100 and more passengers to board a Turkish Airlines plane, that he became the near-fatal victim of a terrorist bomb, thrown by the Marxist–Leninist ASALA (Armée Secrète Arménienne de Libération de l'Arménie) group. Eight people died as a result, and fifty-six were wounded, among them Çağatay. Having survived but badly burned, he spent the next five years under treatment, frequently visiting burn centers, was operated on often and remained hospitalized for long periods of time, first in France then in his native Turkey. His first photography project, even before he could return to professional life, was a photo essay he made in 1984 on burned patients in the very same hospital in Paris where he was treated for his wounds.

== Change of direction in career ==
His career changed scope and direction, as he moved from current news to a different kind of photo-reporting: he photographed an extensive selection of old manuscripts found in the Topkapı Museum Library in Istanbul. The photo-essay, the first of its kind on the topic, appeared in leading magazines in France, the United States, Spain, and Japan. In 1990-1991 he started a widespread study of second-generation immigrants in Europe, but due to lack of funds he failed to complete it.

== Work in Central Asia ==
Çağatay began working in Central Asia in 1993. He had traveled so far more than 150,000 kilometers in the region and taken more than 40,000 photographs. He also did research in the photo archives of the countries of the region and compiled a sampling of these as an extensive photo exhibition entitled “Once Upon a Time in Central Asia” which was on display in the following countries:

- Union of Painters, Tashkent, Uzbekistan, May 1966
- State Fine Arts Museum, Almaty, Kazakhstan, June 1996
- Memorial Museum, Austin, Texas, February/March 1997
- Kashiwazaki/Nigata, Japan, October 1997 - January 1998
- Gustavianum Museum, Uppsala, Sweden, November 1999

He had founded the company Tetragon, which published in 1996 a large-format book under the same title as the exhibition.

He moreover co-produced a documentary film on the ecological disaster of the Aral Sea. An abbreviated (thirty minutes) version of the two-hour documentary won first prize in 2000 in the "short film" category at the Antalya Film Festival.

== Turkic-Speaking Peoples ==
Çağatay's long-cherished project was a book that would comprise a selection of photographs he took on Turks living in various parts of the world and scholarly essays by experts to go with the photographs. He asked Doğan Kuban, the renowned professor of architectural history, to be the co-editor in charge of the essays, while he himself was the book's project manager as well as the author of the photographs, some of them of stunning artistic beauty. The book, financed by the Prince Claus Fund of the Netherlands, came out in the fall of 2006 from the German publisher Prestel Verlag in Munich. Distributed in Europe and the US, it quickly sold out and a second printing followed. It was also translated into Turkish and published by Tetragon in 2008.

The book includes essays by, besides Kuban, thirty-three other scholars such as Peter Golden, Omeljan Pritsak and İsenbike Togan.

== Personal life ==
One assignment the young journalist Çağatay was given in Istanbul when he started in the late 1960s was to report on a state-operated kindergarten where European advisors worked. Çağatay and Käri Wulff, the Norwegian expert in pre-school education he met there that day, were married in 1972. They had two children, and two grandchildren by their daughter.

His younger sister İlgün died on March 3, 1974, whilst a passenger on Turkish Airlines Flight 981 that crashed near Ermenonville in France, shortly after leaving Paris.

Çağatay lived the rest of his life in Istanbul with his wife.

== Bibliography ==
- Çağatay, Ergun. Once Upon a Time in Central Asia. İstanbul: Tetragon, 1996.
- Çağatay, Ergun and Doğan Kuban, eds. Turkic-Speaking Peoples: 1500 Years of Art And Culture from Inner Asia to the Balkans. München, Berlin, London, New York: Prestel Verlag, 2006.
- Çağatay, Ergun and Doğan Kuban, eds. Türkçe Konuşanlar: Orta Asya'dan Balkanlar'a 2000 Yıllık Sanat ve Kültür. Çev. Zeynep Peker ve Jale Alguadiş. İstanbul: Tetragon, 2007.
- “Ergun Çağatay.” Tetragon. Retrieved: 6 August 2012.
- “ergun çağatay.” ekşi sözlük. Retrieved: 6 August 2012.
- “Ergun Çağatay - Biographie.” actuphoto. Retrieved: 6 August 2012.
- “the turkic speaking peoples.” ekşi sözlük. Retrieved: 6 August 2012.
