= Chagatai Turks (disambiguation) =

The Chagatai Turks are people who descended from the Chagatai Khanate.

It may refer to:

- Chagatai Khanate
- Chagatai Khan
- Chughtai

== See also ==
- Chagatai (disambiguation)
