= Abd ar-Rashid Khan II =

Abd ar-Rashid Khan II (Chagatai and Persian: عبد الرشید خان ثانی) was Khan of Yarkand and Turpan from 1680 to 1682. He was son of Baba Khan or Babak Khan. Baba Khan was son of Ismail Khan (Moghul khan).

== Dzungar's appointment of the khan ==
After Galdan Boshugtu Khan occupied Yarkand, he did not hand over power to Afaq Khoja, who had rendered outstanding service to him but appointed one of the members of the old chaghatai family, Abdul ar-Rashid Khan II, son of Baba Khan of Turpan, as Khan and made him his vassal.

== Conflict between Khan and Afaq Khoja ==
Discord soon arose between Khan and Afaq Khoja, however, with the latter fleeing the region once again. In 1682 riots erupted in Yarkand and the khan fled to Ili, his younger brother Muhammad Amin Khan thereafter became khan.

== See also ==
- List of Chagatai khans
