= Uqturpan County =

Uqturpan County: ئۇچتۇرپان ناھىيىسى (Uyghur); 乌什县 (Chinese); Uchturpan, Wushi, Uch Turfan, Wushih
- County
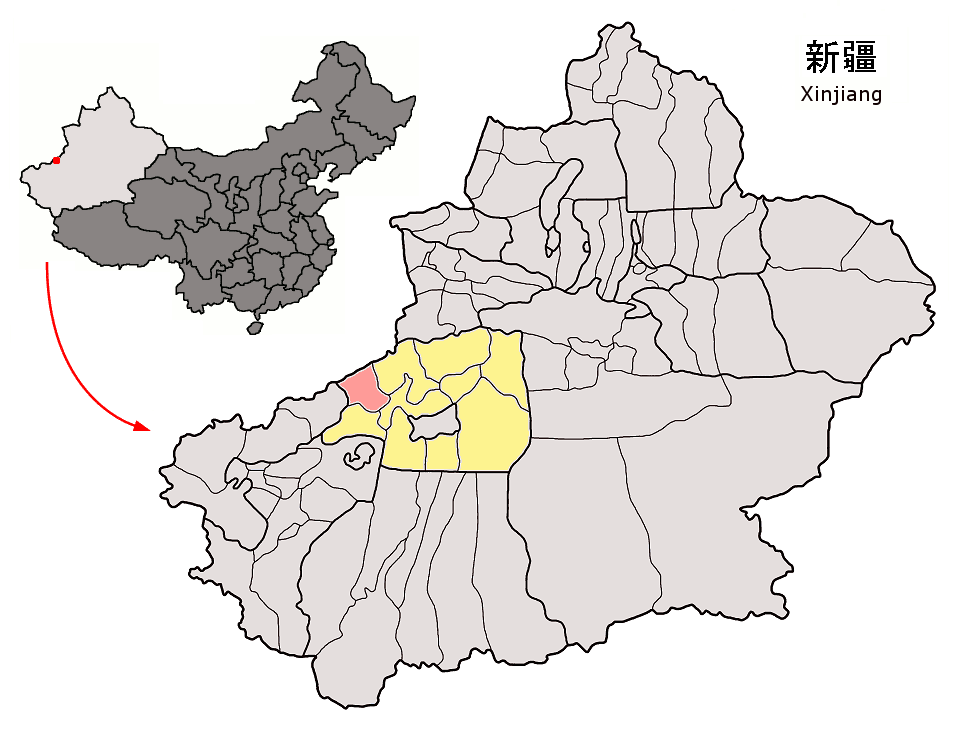
- Location of Uqturpan County (red) within Aksu Prefecture (yellow) and Xinjiang

- Location of the seat in Xinjiang Uqturpan (China)
- Coordinates: 41°12′50″N 79°13′23″E
- Country: China
- Autonomous region: Xinjiang
- Prefecture: Aksu
- County seat: Uqturpan Town (Wushi)
- Township-level divisions: 3 towns, 6 townships

Area
  - Total: 9,051.54 km^{2} (3,494.82 sq mi)
- Elevation: 1,200–2,000 m (3,900–6,600 ft)

Population (2020)
  - Total: 205,571
  - Density: 22.7112/km^{2} (58.8216/sq mi)

Ethnic groups
  - Major ethnic groups: Uyghur
- Time zone: UTC+8 (China Standard (Note: Locals in Xinjiang frequently observe UTC+6 (Xinjiang Time), 2 hours behind Beijing.))
- Postal code: 843400
- Website: www.ws.gov.cn (in Chinese)

Uqturpan County

Uyghur name
- Uyghur: ئۇچتۇرپان ناھىيىسى
Transcriptions
- Latin Yëziqi: Uchturpan Nahiyisi
- Yengi Yeziⱪ: Uqturpan Naⱨiyisi
- SASM/GNC: Uqturpan Nahiyisi
- Siril Yëziqi: Учтурпан Наһийиси

Chinese name
- Simplified Chinese: 乌什县
- Traditional Chinese: 烏什縣
Transcriptions
Standard Mandarin
- Hanyu Pinyin: Wūshí Xiàn
- Wade–Giles: Wu¹-shih² Hsien⁴
- IPA: [ú.ʂɻ.ɕjɛ̂n]

Alternative Chinese name
- Simplified Chinese: 乌什吐鲁番县
- Traditional Chinese: 烏什吐魯番縣
Transcriptions
Standard Mandarin
- Hanyu Pinyin: Wūshítǔlǔfān Xiàn
- Wade–Giles: Wu¹-shih²-t'u³-lu³-fan¹ Hsien⁴
- IPA: [ú.ʂɻ.tʰù.lù.fán.ɕjɛ̂n]

Uqturpan County or Uchturpan County (transliterated from Uyghur: ئۇچتۇرپان ناھىيىسى; Chinese: 乌什吐鲁番县), also Wushi County (Chinese: 乌什县), is a county in the Xinjiang Uyghur Autonomous Region under the administration of Aksu Prefecture and shares an approximately 150 km (93 mi) long border with Kyrgyzstan's Issyk-Kul Region. The county is bordered to the northeast by Onsu County (Wensu), to the southeast by Aksu city, to the west by Akqi County in Kizilsu Kyrgyz Autonomous Prefecture and to the south by Kalpin County (Keping). It has an area of 9,012 square kilometres (3,480 sq mi) and as of the 2002 census a population of 180,000.

== Name ==
Uqturpan is also spelled Uchturpan and Uch-Turfan.

== History ==
=== Tang ===
During the Battle of Aksu (717), the Umayyad Caliphate and their Turgesh and Tibetan Empire allies hope to seize Uqturpan (then known as Dai-dʑiᴇk-dʑiᴇŋ) from Tang-Karluks-Exiled Western Turkic Khaganate allies but were repelled.

=== Qing ===
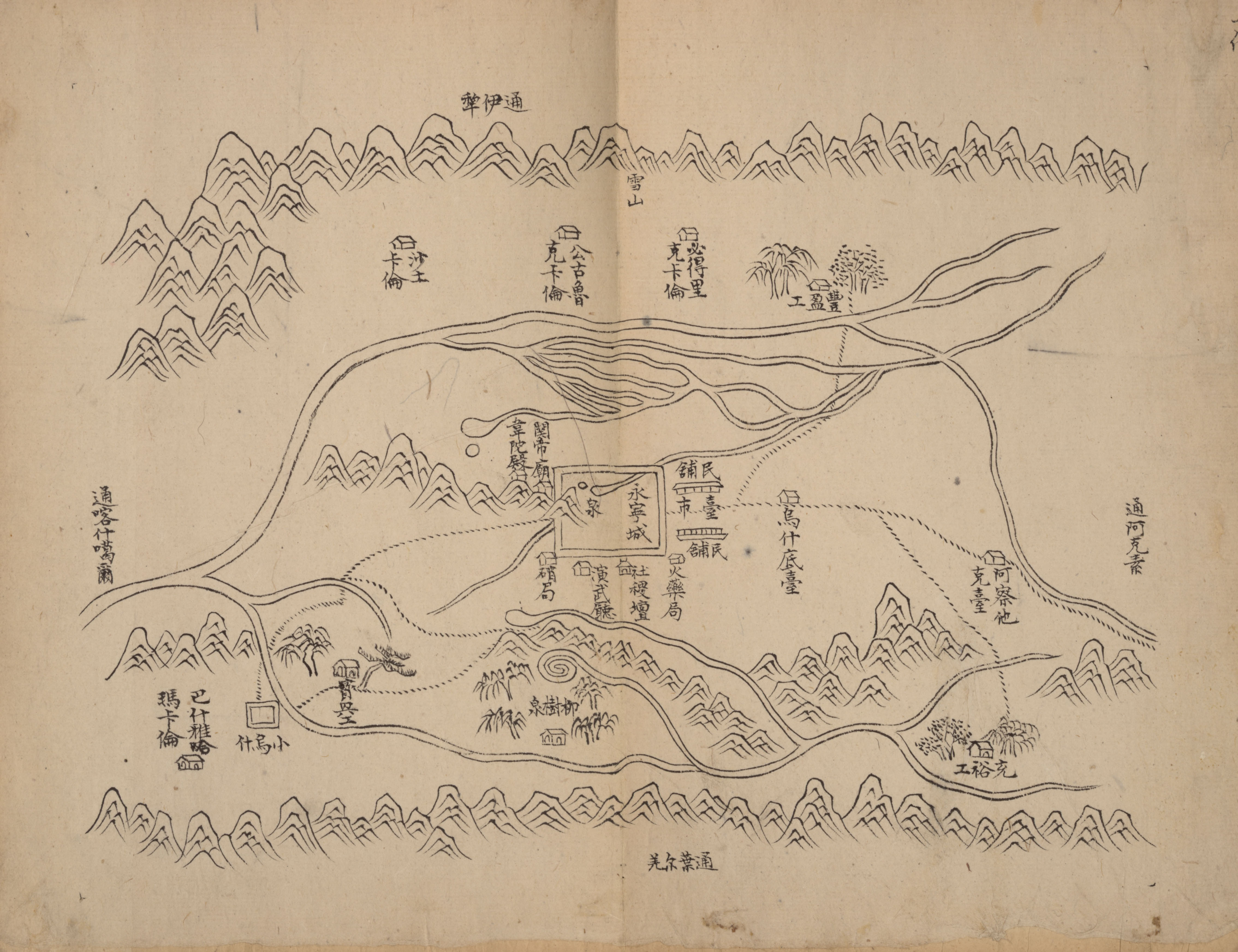
Uqturpan (c. 1759)

Ush Turfan was the site of a battle between Barhanuddin and Abdulla during the Revolt of the Altishahr Khojas. Six years after the Revolt of the Altishahr Khojas, ten years after the Qing's rescue of the Khoja Brothers from Dzungars, an anti-Qing uprising of the local Turkic (later "Uyghur") people took place in Uqturpan. Legend says that a local rebel leader was married to Iparhan, known as the "Fragrant Concubine" a descendant of Apaq Khoja. During the turmoil, many fled, and the thousands who remained were killed by Sino-Manchu forces. Later, the area was repopulated by migrants from what is now Southern Xinjiang.

The Ush rebellion in 1765 by Uyghurs against the Manchus occurred after Uyghur women were gang raped by the servants and son of Manchu official Su-cheng. It was said that Ush Muslims had long wanted to sleep on [Sucheng and son's] hides and eat their flesh. because of the rape of Uyghur Muslim women for months by the Manchu official Sucheng and his son. The Manchu Emperor ordered that the Uyghur rebel town be massacred, the Qing forces enslaved all the Uyghur children and women and slaughtered the Uyghur men. Manchu soldiers and Manchu officials regularly having sex with or raping Uyghur women caused massive hatred and anger by Uyghur Muslims to Manchu rule.

=== 21st century ===
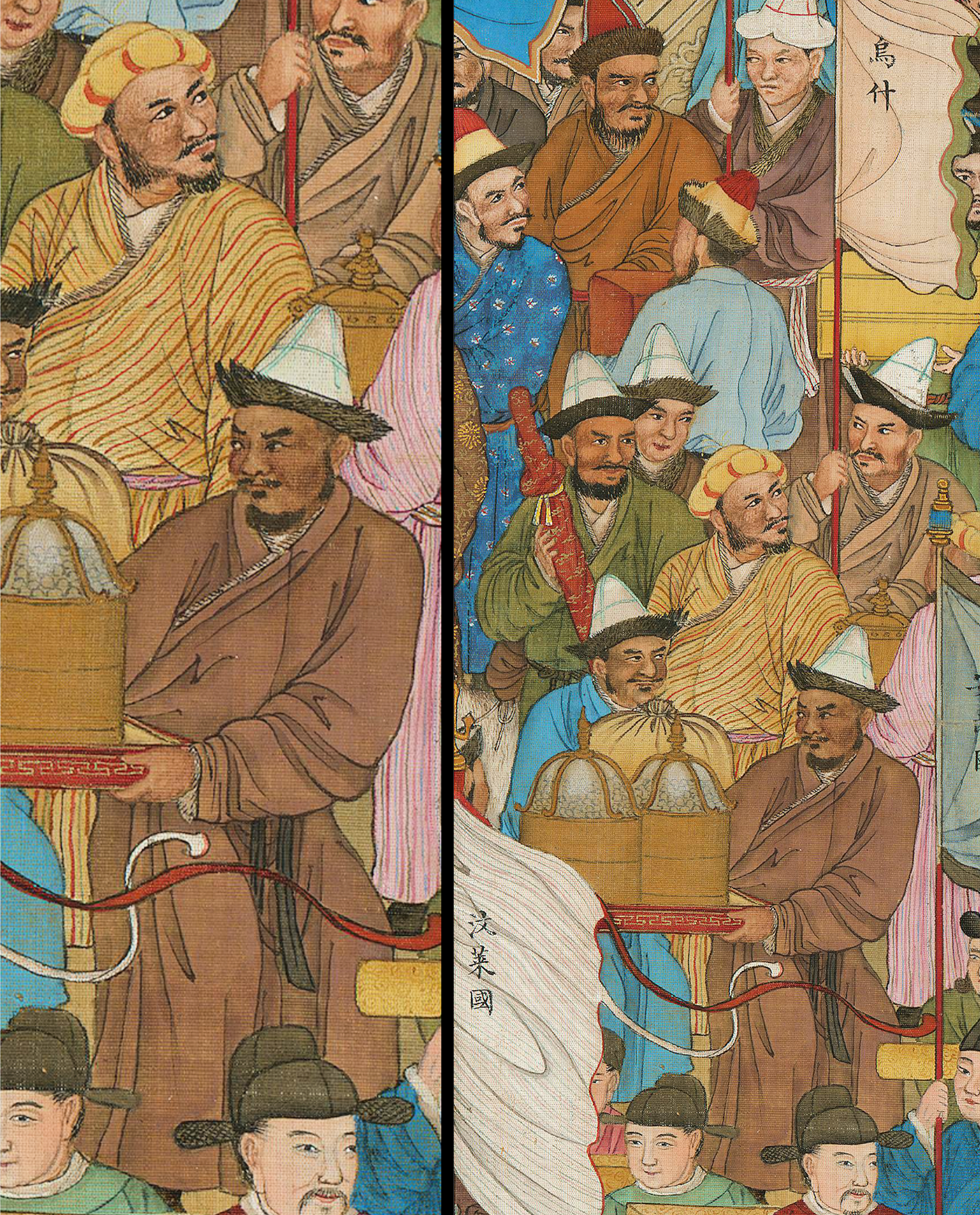
Uqturpan delegates (bottom group, flag "乌什") in Peking in 1761. 万国来朝图

In 2012, Aqyar Township (Aheya) was made a town.

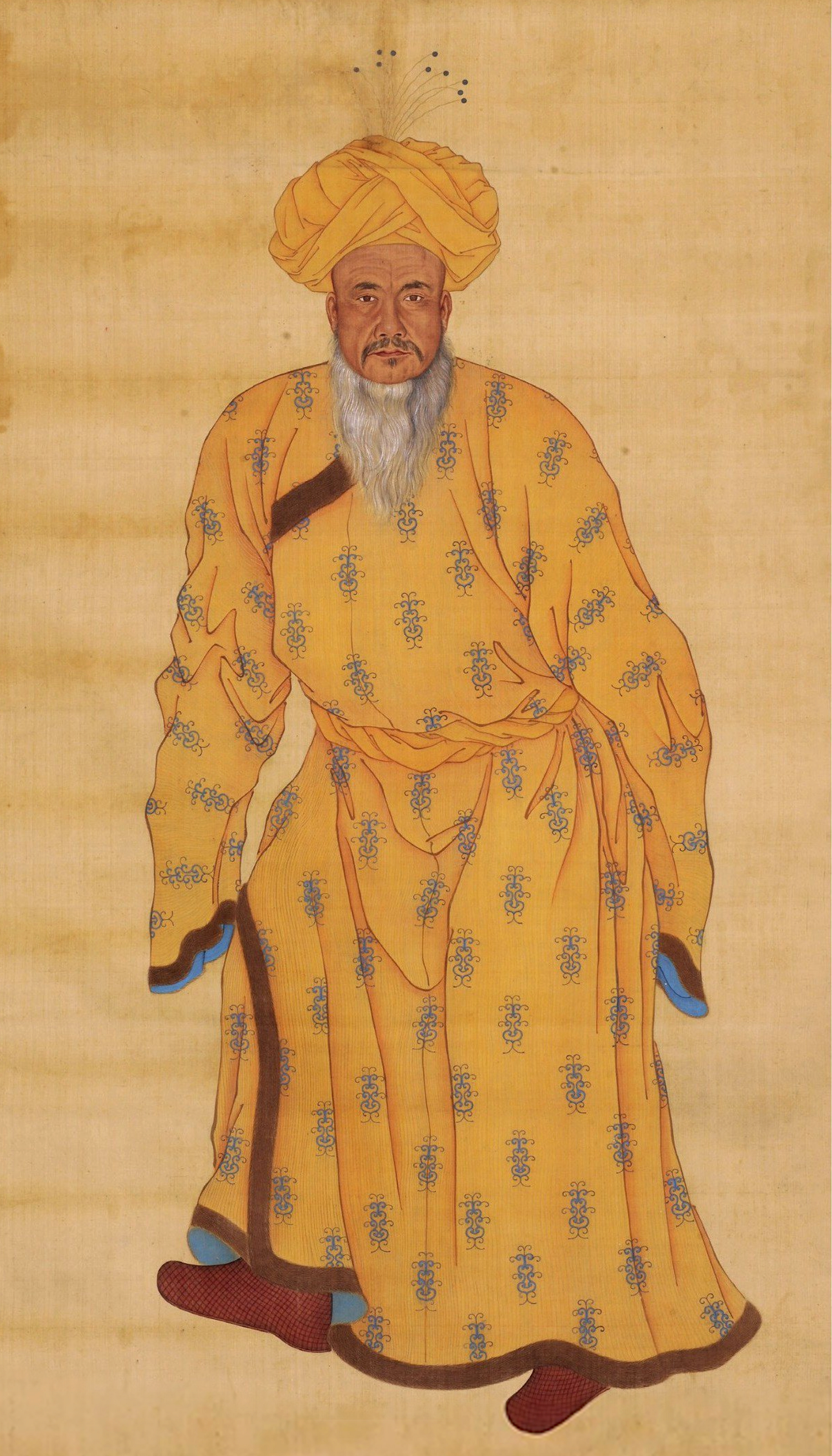
Khojis (−1781), a Uyghur governor of Us-Turfan. Painting by Ignatius Sichelbart, a European Jesuit artist at the Chinese court in 1775.

In a 2012 article from Radio Free Asia, it was reported that according to family sources and local authorities, Islam Urayim, then 32, a native of Uqturpan County who had been deported to China on December 19, 2009, despite seeking asylum in Cambodia, had been sentenced to life in prison. It was unclear when Urayim was sentenced or on what charges he was convicted.

On April 3, 2015, Imam Township (Yimamu) was made a town.

On October 27, 2019, at 1:29 PM, a 5.0-magnitude earthquake hit Uqturpan County. No casualties were reported.

According to a 2020 Radio Free Asia report, it was estimated by local officials that 20,000 Uyghurs were detained in the three re-education camps in the county.

== Geography ==
The highest point in Uqturpan County is Zhatekelie Feng (扎特克列峰) at 5,135 m (16,847 ft) above sea level.

59.9% of the territory of Uqturpan County is mountainous, 27.6% is Gobi-like desert areas and 12.5% is valley flatland.

== Administrative divisions ==
Uqturpan County administered 3 towns, 5 townships and 1 ethnic townships:

Name	Simplified Chinese	Hanyu Pinyin	Uyghur (UEY)	Uyghur Latin (ULY)	Administrative division code	Notes
Towns
Uqturpan Town (Wushi Town)	乌什镇	Wūshí Zhèn	ئۇچتۇرپان بازىرى	Uchturpan baziri	652927100	
Aqyar Town (Aheya, Akyar;	阿合雅镇	Āhéyǎ Zhèn	ئاقيار بازىرى	Aqyar baziri	652927101	
Imam Town	依麻木镇	Yīmámù Zhèn	ئىمام بازىرى	Imam baziri	652927102	formerly Imam Township (依麻木乡)
Townships
Aqtoqay Township	阿克托海乡	Ākètuōhǎi Xiāng	ئاقتوقاي يېزىسى	Aqtoqay yëzisi	652927200	
Yakowruk Township	亚科瑞克乡	Yàkēruìkè Xiāng	ياكۆۋرۈك يېزىسى	yaköwrük yëzisi	652927201	
Achatagh Township	阿恰塔格乡	Āqiàtǎgé Xiāng	ئاچاتاغ يېزىسى	Achatagh yëzisi	652927202	
Yengiawat Township	英阿瓦提乡	Yīng'āwǎtí Xiāng	يېڭىئاۋات يېزىسى	yëngi'awat yëzisi	652927205	
Otbeshi Township	奥特贝希乡	Àotèbèixī Xiāng	ئوتبېشى يېزىسى	Otbëshi yëzisi	652927207	
Ethnic township
Yamansu Kyrgyz Ethnic Township	亚曼苏柯尔克孜族乡	Yàmànsū Kē'ěrkèzīzú Xiāng	يامانسۇ قىرغىز يېزىسى	yamansu qirghiz yëzisi	652927206	(Kyrgyz) جامانسۇۇ قىرعىز ايىلى; Жаман-Суу Кыргыз айылы

== Climate ==
Climate data for Uqturpan, elevation 1,396 m (4,580 ft), (1991–2020 normals, extremes 1981–present)
Month	Jan	Feb	Mar	Apr	May	Jun	Jul	Aug	Sep	Oct	Nov	Dec	Year
Record high °C (°F)	14.8 (58.6)	14.5 (58.1)	27.1 (80.8)	31.5 (88.7)	32.7 (90.9)	35.7 (96.3)	37.9 (100.2)	35.4 (95.7)	35.3 (95.5)	28.7 (83.7)	20.1 (68.2)	16.9 (62.4)	37.9 (100.2)
Mean daily maximum °C (°F)	−2.0 (28.4)	3.8 (38.8)	12.5 (54.5)	20.6 (69.1)	24.8 (76.6)	27.9 (82.2)	29.6 (85.3)	28.5 (83.3)	24.3 (75.7)	17.7 (63.9)	8.2 (46.8)	−0.1 (31.8)	16.3 (61.4)
Daily mean °C (°F)	−9.0 (15.8)	−2.7 (27.1)	6.0 (42.8)	13.7 (56.7)	17.6 (63.7)	20.7 (69.3)	22.2 (72.0)	21.3 (70.3)	16.9 (62.4)	9.6 (49.3)	1.3 (34.3)	−6.4 (20.5)	9.3 (48.7)
Mean daily minimum °C (°F)	−15.0 (5.0)	−8.6 (16.5)	0.0 (32.0)	6.9 (44.4)	10.8 (51.4)	13.9 (57.0)	15.3 (59.5)	14.7 (58.5)	10.4 (50.7)	3.2 (37.8)	−3.6 (25.5)	−11.2 (11.8)	3.1 (37.5)
Record low °C (°F)	−26.6 (−15.9)	−27.3 (−17.1)	−15.1 (4.8)	−3.4 (25.9)	1.3 (34.3)	4.7 (40.5)	8.1 (46.6)	6.0 (42.8)	−0.2 (31.6)	−4.5 (23.9)	−12.3 (9.9)	−23.4 (−10.1)	−27.3 (−17.1)
Average precipitation mm (inches)	2.2 (0.09)	4.8 (0.19)	5.7 (0.22)	10.3 (0.41)	16.5 (0.65)	24.2 (0.95)	23.9 (0.94)	27.8 (1.09)	23.5 (0.93)	4.0 (0.16)	2.5 (0.10)	2.2 (0.09)	147.6 (5.82)
Average precipitation days (≥ 0.1 mm)	3.2	2.6	2.0	2.9	5.9	7.9	9.0	9.7	6.3	1.8	1.5	2.5	55.3
Average snowy days	6.3	3.7	1.9	0.3	0	0	0	0	0	0	2.0	5.3	19.5
Average relative humidity (%)	71	63	51	44	48	52	56	59	63	64	70	75	60
Mean monthly sunshine hours	170.9	187.9	217.7	244.8	282.7	294.7	312.8	286.0	260.2	248.1	185.0	152.6	2,843.4
Percentage possible sunshine	57	62	58	60	62	65	69	68	71	74	64	54	64
Source: China Meteorological AdministrationAll-time January highall-time Jul highall-time September highAll-time Oct extreme

== Demographics ==
Historical population
Year	Pop.	±% p.a.
2000	177,410	—
2010	197,990	+1.10%

As of 2015, 216,579 of the 235,336 residents of the county were Uyghur, 11,462 were Han Chinese, 5,613 were Kyrgyz and 1,682 were from other ethnic groups.

As of 1999, 90.01% of the population of Uqturpan (Wushi) County was Uyghur and 6.73% of the population was Han Chinese.

== Economy ==
Uqturpan County's economy is primarily based on agriculture and animal husbandry, producing wheat, rice, corn, cotton, sesame (胡麻), rapeseed, and pelts. Industries include cooking oil processing, tractor repair, and construction among others.

As of 1885, there was about 86,800 acres (572,793 mu) of cultivated land in Uqturpan.

== Historical maps ==
Historical English-language maps including Uqturpan:

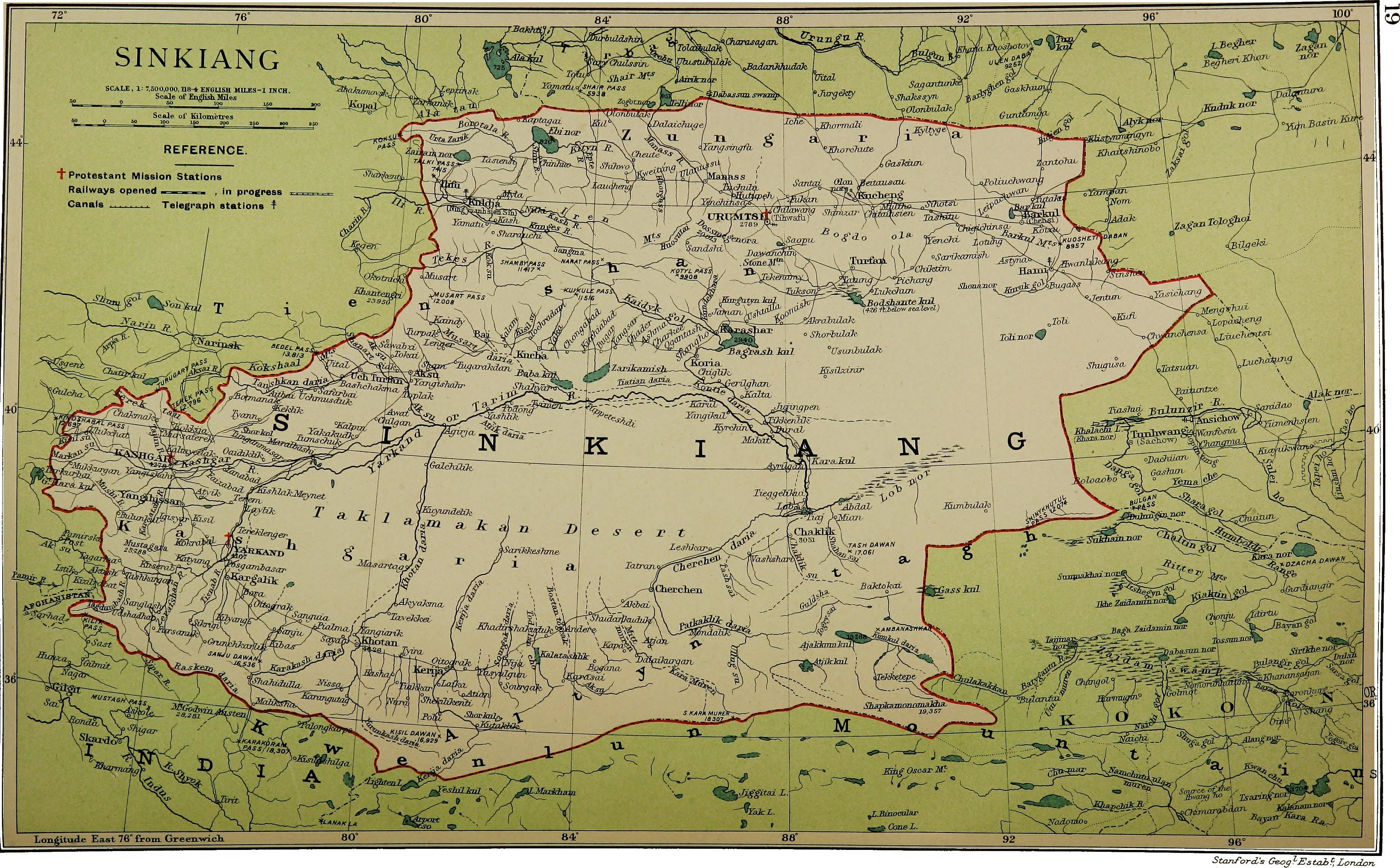
Map including Uqturpan (labeled as Uch Turfan) (1917)

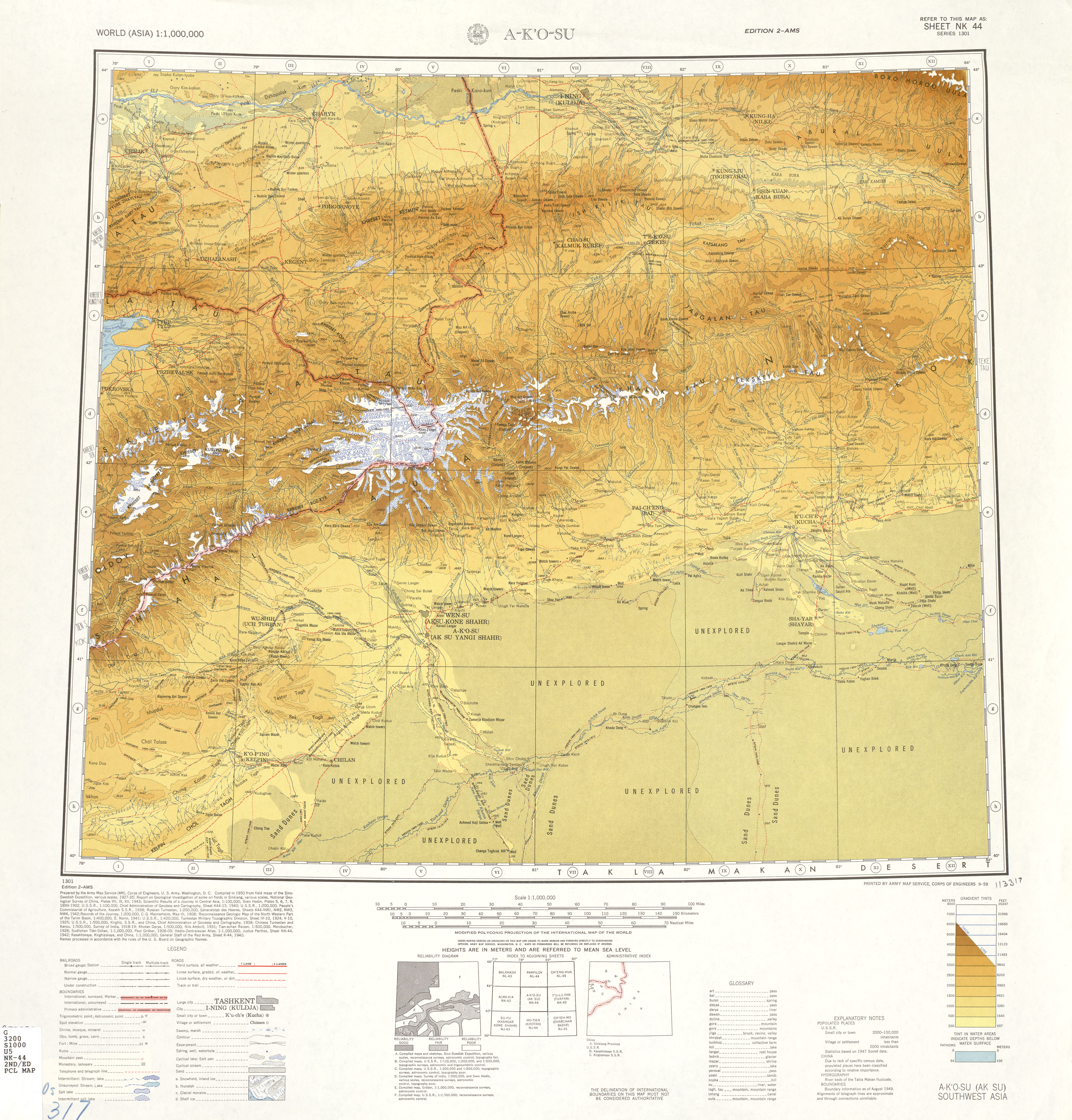
Map including Uqturpan (labeled as WU-SHIH (UCH TURFAN)) and surrounding region from the International Map of the World (AMS, 1950) (Note: From map: "THE DELINEATION OF INTERNATIONAL BOUNDARIES ON THIS MAP MUST NOT BE CONSIDERED AUTHORITATIVE")

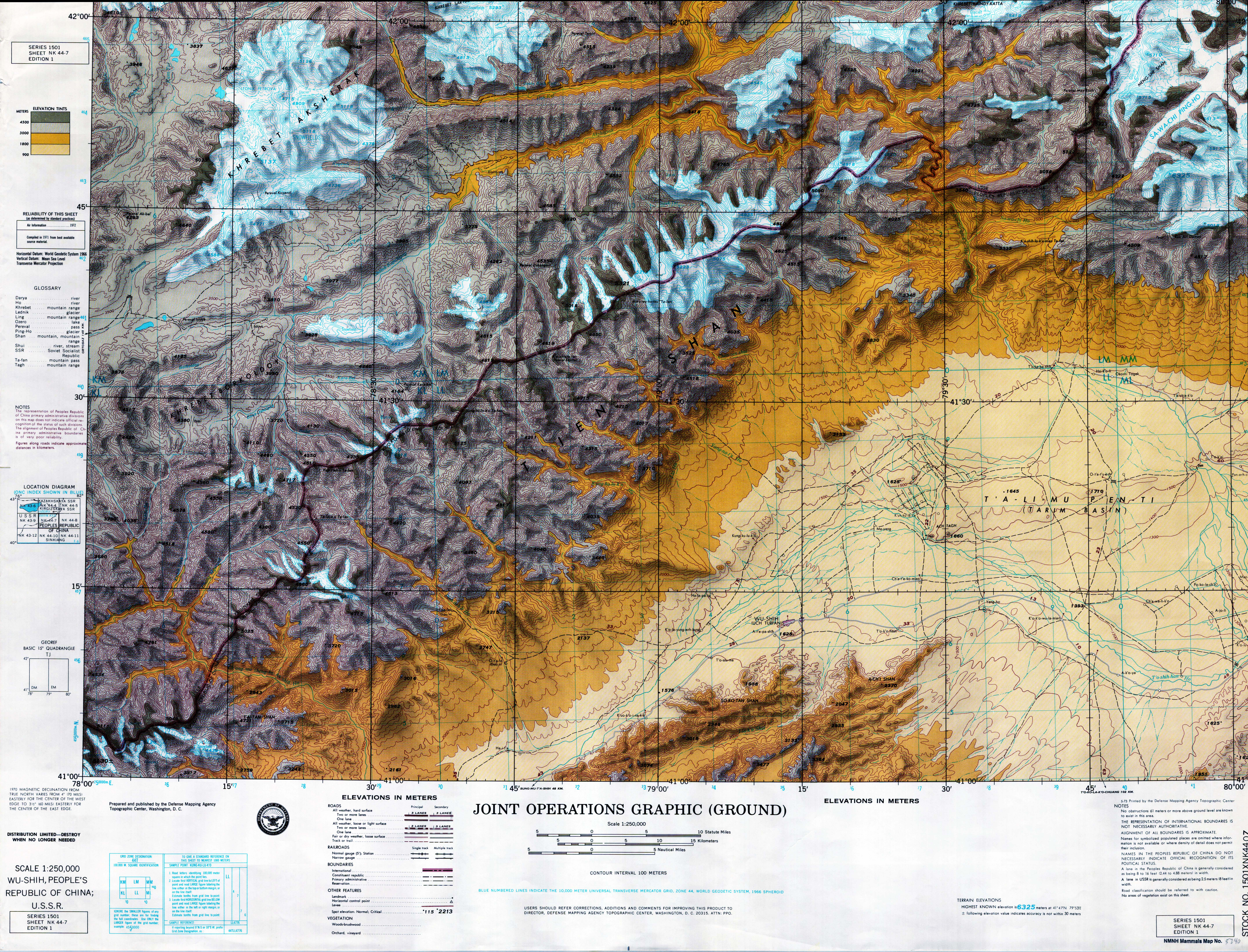
Map including Uqturpan (labeled as WU-SHIH (UCH TURFAN)) (DMA, 1973)

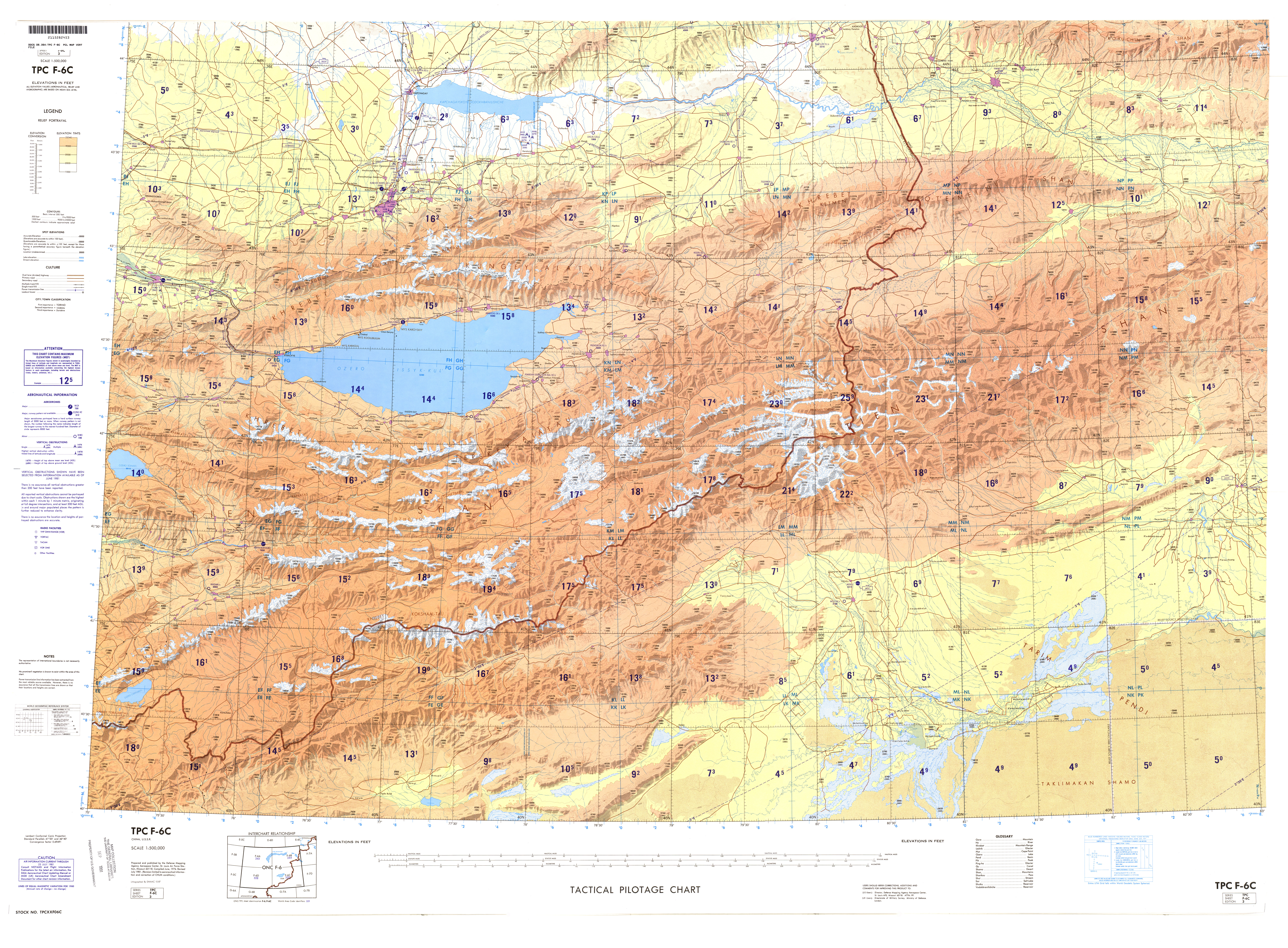
Map including Uqturpan (labeled as Wushi) (DMA, 1981)

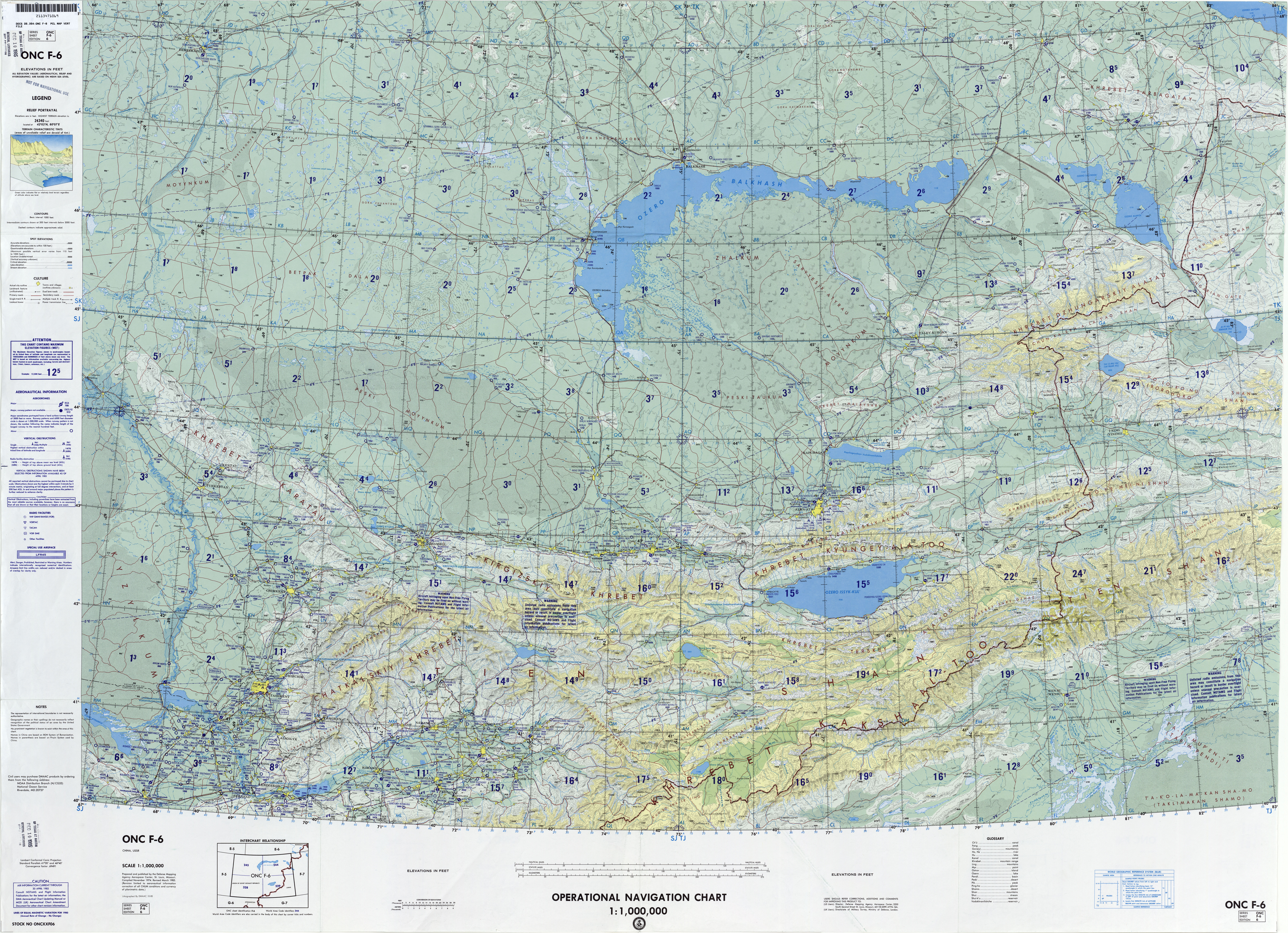
From the Operational Navigation Chart; map including Uqturpan (labeled as Wu-shih (Wushi)) (DMA, 1985) (Note: From map: "The representation of international boundaries is not necessarily authoritative.")
