= Ismail Khan (Moghul khan) =

Ismail Khan (Chagatai and Persian: اسماعیل خان) was Khan of Yarkand and Kashgar between 1666 and 1669. He was replaced by Ilbars Khan from 1669–1670. His khanship was restored from 1670–1680.

== War with Dzungars ==
In 1680 Galdan Boshugtu Khan led 120,000 Dzungar cavalry into the Tarim Basin through Aksu and Turpan towards Kashgar and Yarkand with the help of Afaq Khoja of the White Mountain Khojas and his followers. The army made good progress in their advance. The Chagatai ruler Ismail Khan's son Babak Sultan led his troops and offered fierce resistance only to perish in battle. Having occupied Kashgar, the Dzungar army immediately advanced upon Yarkand. The general Yiwazibo (Iwaz Beg), sent to oppose their advance was killed, and the Dzungar occupied Yarkand and took Ismail Khan and his family as prisoners to Ili.

== See also ==
- List of Chagatai khans
