= Humayunnama =

16th century biographical work by Gulbadan Begum

Humayun-nama
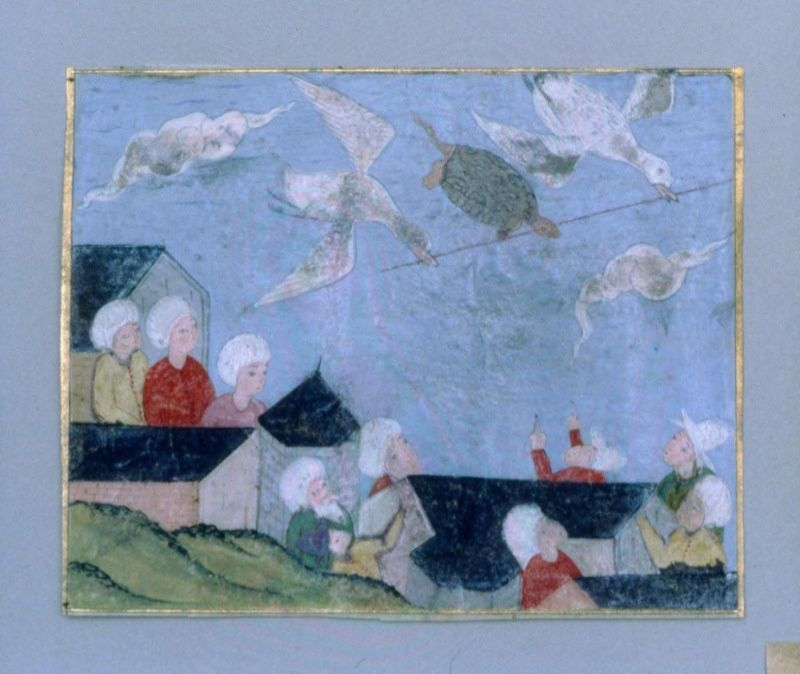
- Author: Gulbadan Begum
- Language: Persian
- Subject: Humayun, life in the Mughal harem
- Genre: Biography, memoir
- Published: c. 1587
- Publication place: Mughal Empire

The Humayun-nama (همایون‌نامه; Book of Humayun), also known as the Ahwal Humayun Padshah Jamah Kardom Gulbadan Begum bint Babur Padshah amma Akbar Padshah, is a 16th-century historical prose text written by Gulbadan Begum, a Mughal princess and the daughter of Emperor Babur. Commissioned by her nephew, Emperor Akbar, the manuscript chronicles the life and reign of her brother, Emperor Humayun, as well as providing an intimate glimpse into the social dynamics of the early Mughal harem. It is notable as the only surviving contemporary historical account written by a woman of Mughal royalty during the 16th century.

== Background and commissioning ==
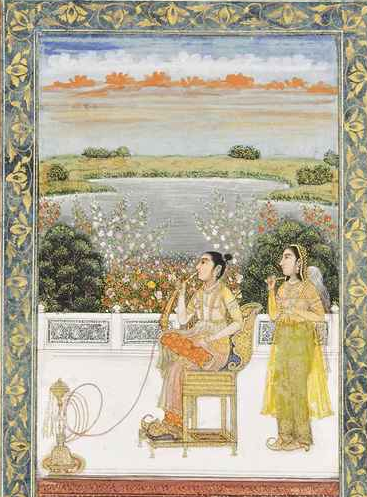
Imaginary portrait of the imperial princess Gulbadan Begum. Painted c. 1800

It was customary for the rulers of the Mughal Empire to engage scholars to document their reigns; Akbar's own official history, the Akbarnama, was being compiled by the Persian scholar Abul Fazl. Akbar, who was fond of his aunt Gulbadan Begum and aware of her storytelling skills, commissioned her to record whatever she could remember about her brother Humayun's life and struggles. The primary objective was to collect raw eyewitness data that Abul Fazl could later utilize for his own imperial project.

Upon receiving the royal directive, Gulbadan Begum noted the challenges of her memory in the introduction of the manuscript:

There had been an order issued, ‘Write down whatever you know of the doings of Firdous-Makani (Babur) and Jannat-Ashyani (Humayun)’. At this time when his Majesty Firdaus-Makani passed from this perishable world to the everlasting home, I, this lowly one, was eight years old, so it may well be that I do not remember much. However in obedience to the royal command, I set down whatever there is that I have heard and remember.

== Contents and style ==
Unlike the highly formal and florid prose written by court scholars of the period, Gulbadan wrote her account in a relatively simple, straightforward Persian. This casual, unembellished style mirrors the direct vernacular approach her father Babur utilized in his autobiography, the Baburnama.

Because she was only eight years old when Babur died, the early sections of the text rely heavily on anecdotal histories and recollections passed down to her by elder women in the imperial harem. The core of the manuscript focuses on the tumultuous political career of Humayun, his military trials, and his eventual exile.

=== Glimpses of the Mughal harem ===
The Humayun-nama is highly valued by modern historians for its candid depiction of the Mughal internal domestic quarters, or harem. Gulbadan portrays an environment that was deeply connected to the political landscape, highlighting that early Mughal women were astute observers of warfare, diplomatic negotiations, and statecraft.

The text also highlights the nomadic, peripatetic lifestyle of the court, which frequently moved as a traveling grand encampment between Kabul, Agra, and Lahore. Gulbadan notes a distinct aversion among early Mughal ladies toward confined, permanent buildings, reinforcing a sentiment later expressed by Shah Jahan's daughter, Jahanara Begum, that static, closed housing would foster the decline of the empire.

=== Notable anecdotes ===
- Babur's practical joke: Gulbadan records a light-hearted event where Babur, after establishing control in India, minted a massive gold coin. He sent it to Kabul with specific instructions to blindfold the court jester, Asas, and hang it around his neck. Believing the heavy weight to be a burden or a threat, Asas was initially terrified, but danced with joy upon discovering it was gold.
- Sacrifice for Humayun: The manuscript features a detailed account of Humayun falling critically ill at the age of 22. Deeply distressed, Babur performed the ritual of circumambulation around his son's bed for four days, praying to Allah to take his own life in exchange for his son's recovery. Humayun subsequently recovered, while Babur fell ill and died shortly thereafter at the age of 47.
- Humayun's marriage to Hamida Banu: Gulbadan describes with a hint of playfulness how a displaced Humayun fell in love with the 13-year-old Hamida Banu Begum. Hamida initially refused to see or marry the much older, exiled emperor, but was eventually persuaded by the senior women of the harem. This union produced Akbar.

== Linguistic debate ==
While the surviving text is in Persian, some scholars suspect that Gulbadan Begum originally drafted the Humayun-nama in her native Chagatai Turkic, the ancestral tongue of the early Mughals, and that the text known today represents a very early contemporary translation.

== Loss and rediscovery ==
For several centuries, the manuscript remained largely lost to mainstream scholarship. The lone surviving historical copy is an incomplete version that ends abruptly mid-sentence in the year 1552, describing the blinding of Humayun's rebellious brother, Kamran Mirza. Consequently, any potential chapters detailing Humayun's fatal fall at the Purana Qila in 1556 or Akbar's subsequent ascension have either been lost or were never completed.

The single, battered physical copy of the manuscript was acquired in India by British collector Colonel G. W. Hamilton. Following his death, his widow sold his collection of over 1,000 manuscripts to the British Museum in 1868.

The historical importance of the text went largely unnoticed until 1901, when Annette S. Beveridge translated it into English, introducing it to international historiography.

== Modern publications ==
- A paperback edition of Beveridge's English translation was published in India in 2001.
- A Bengali translation by Pradosh Chattopadhyay was published by Chirayata Prokashan in 2006.ISBN 81-85696-66-7

== See also ==
- Baburnama
- Akbarnama
- Mughal architecture
