= Babur's First Indian Expedition =

1505 Mughal founder's expedition

- Part of Campaigns of Babur
- Khyber Pakhtunkhwa & Federally Administered Tribal Areas
Date	January – March 1505 CE
Location	Khyber Pakhtunkhwa & FATA, Pakistan
Result	Delhi Sultanate victory

Belligerents
Timurids of Kabul	Delhi Sultanate

Commanders and leaders
Babur	(Delhi Sultanate) Mahmud Lodi (Delhi Sultanate) Ibrahim Lodi

Babur's First Indian Expedition in 1505 was the first incursion toward India by Babur, later founder of the Mughal Empire. Marching from Kabul via Badam Cheshmeh (Surobi district) and Jagdalak to Adinapur Jalalabad). His younger brother, Nasir Mirza, joined him there.

He advanced through the Khyber region into Kohat, Bannu, Desht (Daman), and along the Gomal River near the Takht-e-Sulaiman. The campaign combined reconnaissance and punitive raids against Afghan tribes, marked by plunder and reprisals, before Babur returned to Kabul via Ghazni in May 1505.

== Khyber Pass ==
From Kush Gumbez he stopped at Garam Cheshmeh where he met one Pekhi, a head man of the Gagianis who had been used to accompany caravans. He took Pekhi along as a guide. From there he passed Khyber and encamped at Jamrud. Babur wanted to see Gorkhatri in Peshawar, one the holy places of the Jogis of the Hindus who come from great distances to cut their hair and shave their beards. But the guide Malek Abu Saeed Kamari did not show them where it was but just as they had returned and close upon the camp he said to Khwaja Muhammad Amin that Gorkhatri was in Peshawar but that he did not mention it for fear of being obliged to go among narrow caverns and dangerous recesses.

== Kohat Expedition ==
At Jamrud, Babur decided that he would proceed further and cross the River Indus but Baqi Cheghaniani advised that instead of crossing the Indus they should proceed against a place called Kohat. So he marched off from Jamrud and crossing the Bareh advanced up to Muhammad Pekh and Abani and encamped not far from them. At this time the Gagiani Afghans were in Peshawar and from fear of the Mughals they had all drawn off to the skirts of the mountains. At this encampment Khusroe Gagiani one of the chief men of the Gagianis came and paid Babur respects. Along with Pekhi, he too would become a counsel and guide during this expedition. Marching from this station about midnight and passing Muhammad Pekh at sunrise, Babur fell upon and plundered Kohat about lunch time and found a great many bullocks and buffaloes. He also made a great many Afghans prisoners but the whole of these He sought out and released. In their houses immense quantities of grain were found. Babur's plundering parties pushed on as far as the river Indus on the banks of which they rested all night and next day came and rejoined him. The army, however, found none of the riches which Baqi Cheghaniani had led them to expect and Baqi was greatly ashamed of his expedition. Having stayed two days and two nights in Kohat and called in his plundering detachments, Babur held a council to consider ravaging the lands of the Afghans in Bannu and Bangash (Kurram) and then return by way of Naghz or Fermul.

== Hangu Expedition ==
Babur left Kohat marched south towards Bangash (Kurram Valley) by the route of Hangu. Between Kohat and Hangu there lies a valley with a high mountain on each side through which the road passes. When Babur had reached this glen, the Afghans of Kohat occupied the hills that overhang the glen on both sides raised the war shout and made a loud clamor. Malek Abu Saeed Kamari informed Babur that a little further on there was a small hill on the right of the road and that if the Afghans should pass from their mountain to that hill which was detached the Mughals might then surround them on all sides and get hold of them. So when the Afghans having descended upon the Mughals came and occupied that detached hill Babur instantly dispatched a party of his men to take possession of the neck of ground between the mountain and the hill. And ordered the rest of the army to attack the hill on both sides. The army moved regularly to kill the afghans who could not stand their ground and in an instant a hundred or a hundred and fifty of them were slaughtered and many others surrendered. Babur in his usual Timurid and Mongol custom had many beheaded and a tower of heads erected.

== Bannu Expedition ==
Next day Babur reached Hangu. The Afghans of that had fortified a hill. They call a detached piece of a hill strongly fortified a sanger. Babur immediately on coming up to the sanger stormed and took it and cut off a few hundred heads of the Afghans which they brought down along with them. There also, he erected a tower of heads. Marching from Hangu he reached Til at bottom of the upper Bangash. The soldiers set out to plunder the Afghans of the neighborhood. Some of them who had made an attack on a sanger returned without success. Marching from there and proceeding in a direction in which there was no road Babur halted one night and on the day after he reached a very precipitous declivity he was obliged to dismount and descended by a long and steep defile. The soldiers as well as the camels and horses traveled an extremely steep and narrow defile and the greater part of the bullocks which he had brought away as plunder in the course of this expedition was lost. The common road was only a mile or two to his right and road by which he was conducted was not a horse road. As the herds and flocks of sheep and mares go down this descent and by the defile, it was for that reason it was called the Sheep road. Immediately on descending from the hills of Bangash and Naghz, Bannu appeared in sight. The Kurram River runs through the Bannu territory and by means of it, chiefly is the country cultivated. On the east are Choupareh and the river Indus on the north is Dinkot and on the south is Desht (Daman) and Tak. Bazar is down west of Tak.

Of the Afghan tribes the Kirani, the Kivi, the Sur, the Isakhel and Niazi cultivate the ground in this country. On ascending into the Bannu territory, Babur received information that the tribes inhabiting the plain had erected a sanger in the hills to the north. He, therefore, dispatched against them a body of troops under Jahangir Mirza II. The sanger against which he went was that of the Kivi tribe. It was taken in an instant, a general massacre ensued and a number of heads were cut off. Of the heads a pile of skulls was formed in the Bannu country. After the taking of this sanger one of the chiefs of the Kivis named Shadi Khan came to me with grass in his mouth and made his submission. After the sack of Kohat it had been resolved that after plundering the Afghans about Bangash and Bannu Babur would return to Kabul by way of Naghz or Fermul.

== Desht Expedition ==
After ravaging Bannu, however, persons perfectly acquainted with the whole routes represented to Babur that Desht was near at, that the inhabitants were wealthy and the roads good and it was finally determined that instead of returning by Fermul they should plunder the Desht and return by that road. Babur next marched and halted on the banks of the same river at a village of the Isakhel. The Isakhel having had notice of the Mughal approach had betaken themselves to the Choupareh mountains. Babur next marched from the village of the Isakhel and encamped on the skirts of the Choupareh Mountains while the skirmishers ascending the mountain stormed a sanger of the Isakhel and brought back sheep cattle and cloths in great quantity. The same night the Isakhel Afghans attempted a surprise but The whole Mughal army was prepared for this and had been drawn up in battle array with right and left wing center and van at their stations, armed and ready to maintain their posts and there were foot soldiers on the watch all round the camp at the distance of rather more than a bowshot from the tents. In this manner the army passed the night. On the right wing was Jahangir Mirza with Baqi Cheghaniani, Shirim Taghai, Syed Hussain Akbar and several other Begs on the left wing were Mirza Khan, Abdal-Razak Mirza, Qasim Bayg and some other Begs. In the center there were none of the superior Begs all of them were Begs of Babur's household in the van were Syed Qasim, Baba Ughul Alaberdi and several other Begs. The whole army was divided into six bodies each of which in its turn was appointed to keep watch for one whole day and night. Leaving the skirt of this mountain. Babur then crossed Kurram Valley advancing south to Desht aka Daman. He reached the villages of Desht during Asr prayer time. Pillaging parties were sent in all directions. Midi Moghul encountered Khwaja Khizr Lohani who was one of the most noted and eminent of the Afghan merchants and slaughtered him.

== Gomal River, Sakhi Sarwar & Takht-e-Sulaiman Mountain ==
His next march was to the banks of the river Gomal. From there two roads that lead to the west; One of them is the road of Sang Surakh which reaches Urgun (Paktika, Afghanistan) by way of Kaniguram; The other is along the banks of Gomal which also conducts to Urgun via Gholeri Pass (Gumal Pass?). But after 7 March 1505, some of his men suggested that they should turn from the extremity of the Takht-e-Sulaiman Mountain as a short cut. But none of his army knew for sure about the roads’ length or shortness. It had been adopted on mere idle surmise. When he reached the mountain a body of Afghans presented themselves on an eminence close upon the mountain. He instantly proceeded to charge them at full gallop the greater part of them fled away the rest attempted to make a stand on some small hills which were on the skirts of the heights. Sultan Ali Chanak rode up and gained one summit. In another declivity of the hill, Qutlugh Qadam engaged an Afghan in combat and while they grappled both of them fell tumbling from a height, however Qutlugh cut off his head. Kubek Beg too faced off with an afghan and won. After defeating the Afghans he continued his march alongside the mountain and finally arrived at Belah, a small district lying on the banks of the Indus and which was dependent on Multan. He now kept close to the Indus marching further south till he reached the tomb of Sakhi Sarwar. This tomb was very highly respected in India. It lies on the skirts of a hill which is connected with the Takht-e-Sulaiman Mountain.

== To Ghazni via South Waziristan ==
From here Babur reached Rudi, a place dependent on the country of Duki here his men captured Fazil Kokaltash, the Darogha of Siwi, a servant of Shah Beg Arghun of Sindh with twenty of his people who had come to reconnoiter Baburs’ movements but were released as at that time he was not ready for direct confrontation with the Arghuns. Leaving this station he arrived at Chotiali, one of the villages of Duki. Things were getting harder for Babur now, more than before. Supplies, men and horses were all exhausted by the debacle of taking such a lengthy route back to Kabul. Babur now returned by way of the tomb of Sakhi Sarwar.

Meanwhile, conspiracy to leave Babur was afloat. His brother Jahangir Mirza came up to him and informed him in private that Baqi Cheghaniani planned to go over to the Arghuns. It was not certain whether Syed Hussain Akbar, Sultan Ali Chehreh and other Begs and retainers of Khusroe Shah were in on this conspiracy. Nonetheless, Babur decided to move quickly, he marched till he reached Ab-i Istada lake. On reaching the banks of the river of the plain of Kattehwaz which falls into Ab-e-Istada his army unable to find a ford, swam through. After passing this torrent he proceeded by the way of Kuhneh Nani and passing the Band-e-Sardeh (water mound of Sardeh) reached Ghazni.

== Return to Kabul ==
But reaching Kabul was still a problem. The greater part of the streams and rivers came down in flood so violently that year that he could get no passage over the river of Deh Yakub. So he had a boat constructed and launched it in the river of Deh Yakub opposite to Kamari and by means of this vessel all the army was passed over. In this way after surmounting the hill pass of Sejawand. He marched north and passing the Kamari River in boats reached Kabul in May 1505.
