= Bajaur massacre =

1519 mass killing in Bajaur (present-day Pakistan)

- Part of Campaigns of Babur
| Date | 6–7 January 1519 |
| Location | Bajaur, Sultanate of Swat (present-day Khyber Pakhtunkhwa, Pakistan) |
| Result | Timurid victory |

Belligerents
| Timurids | Gibarids |

Commanders and leaders
| Babur | Sultan Haidar Ali Gibari |

Casualties and losses
| | 3,000 |

The Bajaur massacre or Battle of Bajaur was a military conflict waged by Babur against the Gabari Swati tribe inhabiting the Bajaur region, on 6–7 January 1519. Babur, a Timurid (and later Mughal) ruler from Fergana (in present-day Uzbekistan) who captured Kabul in 1504, launched this assault with the purpose of solidifying his authority in the Kabulistan. It took place in Bajaur, located in present-day Khyber Pakhtunkhwa, Pakistan on the border with Afghanistan. After capturing the Fort of Bajaur, Babur massacred at least 3,000 Bajauris, and set up a tower of their skulls, charging them of being "false to Islam."

== Background ==
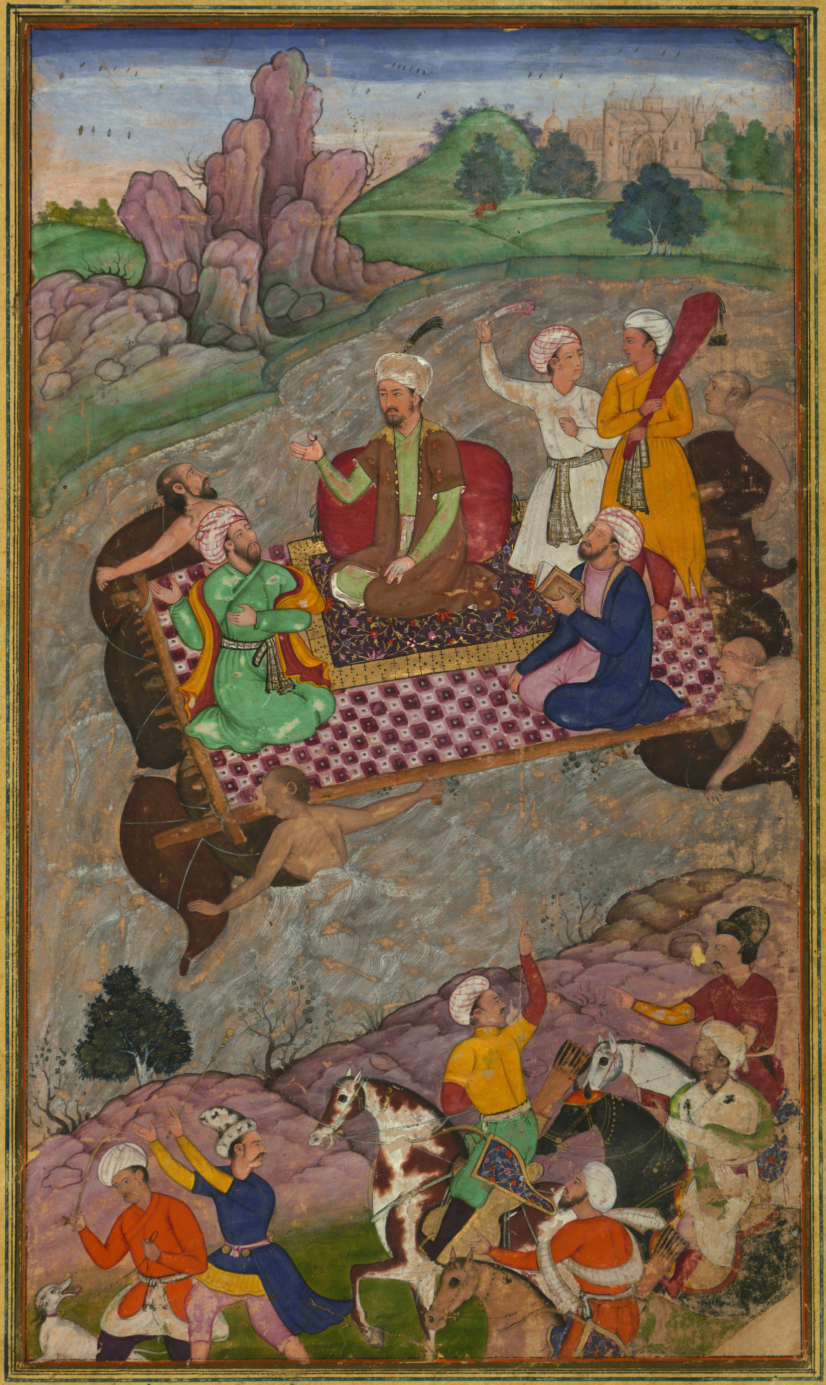
Babur crossing the Kunar River on a raft, west of Bajaur

From 1515-19, Babur enjoyed a relatively calm period when he returned to Kabul in the aftermath of his defeat at the Battle of Ghazdewan and loss of Transoxiana to the Khanate of Bukhara. But all that came to an end, when he had reached the eastern-end of Kabulistan region. He had to conciliate and give autonomy to the Yusufzai in order to maintain peace.

According to Babur's Baburnama, the people of Bajaur, Kunar, Nur Gal, and Swat were following pagan customs, although they were Muslims. Babur claimed that the people of these areas commonly said that when a woman died and was laid on a bier, then if she had not been a wrongdoer, she would give the bearers of the bier a sudden shake, resulting in her corpse falling to the ground; but if she had been a wrongdoer, the bier would not move. Babur further claimed that Haidar Ali Gaberi, the Swati Jahangiri Sultan of Bajaur, did not weep or lament when his mother died, but instead said: "Go! lay her on the bier! if she move not, I will have her burned." When she was lad on the bier, the desired movement occurred, and only then Haidar Ali Bajauri put on black and lamented for his mother.

== Massacre ==
On 7 January 1519, Babur wrote: "As the Bajauris were rebels and at enmity with the people of Islam, and as, by reason of the heathenish and hostile customs prevailing in their midst, the very name of Islam was rooted out from their tribe, they were put to general massacre and their wives and children were made captive. At a guess more than 3,000 men went to their death; as the fight did not reach to the eastern side of the fort, a few got away there. "The fort taken, we entered and inspected it. On the walls, in houses, streets and alleys, the dead lay, in what numbers! Comers and goers to and fro were passing over the bodies. Returning from our inspection, we sat down in the Bajaur sultan’s [Sultan Haidar Ali Bajauri] residence. The country of Bajaur we bestowed on Khwāja Kalān, assigning a large number of braves to reinforce him. At the Evening Prayer we went back to camp." On 8 January, Babur wrote: "Marching at dawn, we dismounted by the spring of Bābā Qarā in the valley of Bajaur. At Khwāja Kalān’s request the prisoners remaining were pardoned their offences, reunited to their wives and children, and given leave to go, but several sultans and of the most stubborn were made to reach their doom of death. Some heads of sultans and of others were sent to Kabul with the news of success; some also to Badakhshan, Qunduz (Kunduz), and Balkh with the letters-of-victory. Shah Mansur Yusufzai,—he was with us as an envoy from his tribe,— was an eye-witness of the victory and general massacre. We allowed him to leave after putting a coat (tūn) on him and after writing orders with threats to the Yusufzai."

On 11 January, Babur wrote: "With mind easy about the important affairs of the Bajaur fort, we marched, on Tuesday, one kuroh (2 m.) down the valley of Bajaur and ordered that a tower of heads should be set up on the rising-ground."

== Aftermath ==
Babur was unable to advance into India safely without reconciliating with the neighbouring Yusufzai which sat on the strategic hills which threatened his empire. Babur sought peace with the tribe and as part of a peace treaty, Babur married Bibi Mubarika, daughter of Yusufzai chief Shah Mansur, on 30 January 1519. Mubarika played an important role in the establishment of friendly relations of Yusufzai Pashtun chiefs with Babur, who later founded the Mughal Empire after defeating Pashtun Sultan Ibrahim Lodi at the Battle of Panipat in 1526.
