= Battle of Qalat =

- Part of Campaigns of Babur
Date	1506
Location	Qalati Ghilji, Zabul, Afghanistan
Result	Timurid victory

Belligerents
Timurids of Kabul	Arghun dynasty

Commanders and leaders
Zahir-ud-din Muhammad Babur; Jahangir Mirza II; Baqi Cheghaniani; Kuchek Baqi Dewana; Kuchek Beg	Farrukh Arghun; Kara Bilut

Babur had planned an expedition against Kandahar in 1506, which was governed by Shah Shuja better known as Shah Beg Arghun. Babur had marched towards Shniz where Wardak Afghans were residents. He had not decided yet whether or not to proceed against Kandahar when he held a war council in which his brother Jahangir Mirza II and Baqi Cheghaniani suggested instead of taking Qalati Ghilji. Qalati Ghilji was bestowed on Mukim Beg Arghun by his father Dhul-Nun Beg Arghun. Mukim's partisans, Farrukh Arghun and Kara Bilut, held it at this time on his part. On reaching Tazi, Sher Ali Chihreh and Kuchek Baqi Dewana, with some others, had formed the plan of deserting. Babur instantly had them seized, Sher Ali Chihreh was executed, having deprived the others of their arms and horses, he let them go.

When he reached Qalati Ghilji, without having put on armor, or erected any siege engines for an attack, he instantly made an assault. The conflict was severe. Kuchek Beg, the elder brother of Khwaja Kalan, had clambered up a tower on the south-west of Qalāt-e Ghiljī, and had nearly gained the top, when he was wounded in the eye with a spear; and he died of this wound two or three days after Qalati Ghilji was taken. Kuchek Baqi Dewana, who had been seized while attempting to desert with Sher Ali, here atoned for that act of treachery, being killed with a stone under the rampart, while attempting to enter. Two or three other persons of note were killed. The fight continued in this way till about the time of Dhuhr (afternoon) prayers; when, just as the assailants, who had fought bravely, and exerted all their vigor, were almost exhausted, the garrison demanded quarter, and Farrukh Arghun and Kara Bilut surrendered. Babur gave the administration of Qalati Ghilji to Jahangir Mirza II, but he refused, neither Baqi Cheghaniani would undertake to keep it, though he could offer no satisfactory excuse for declining. Babur was upset that all their efforts in taking the fort had come to nothing. So he decided to plunder the Afghans of Sawa-Sang, Alatagh, and then returned to Kabul.
