= Battle of Kannauj =

1540 battle during Sur campaigns against the Mughal Empire

- Part of Mughal–Afghan Wars
Date	17 May 1540
Location	Kannauj, Mughal Empire
Result	Sur victory

Belligerents
Sur Empire	Mughal Empire

Commanders and leaders
Sher Shah Suri	Humayun (AWOL); Bairam Khan (POW); Askari; Hindal; Haidar Beg

Strength
Disputed; 30,000 (Ahmad); 15,000 (Ali Khan) or 5,000 men (Ahmad)	Disputed; 100,000 horsemen 40,000–50,000 (Ali Khan); Abundant artillery

Casualties and losses
Unknown	Heavy

The Battle of Kannauj or Battle of Bilgram also known as Battle of Ganges took place at Kannauj, Uttar Pradesh, India between Sher Shah Suri and Humayun on 17 May 1540. This conflict occurred near Bilgram, where Humayun was defeated.

== Background ==
On 26 June 1539, the army led by Sher Shah Suri destroyed the Mughal forces which were led by Humayun at the Battle of Chausa. Mughal Emperor Humayun fled the incident jumping in the Ganges and saved his life somehow. Losing at the battle of Chausa, Humayun came back to Agra asking for assistance of his brothers to challenge Sher Shah Suri again. One of his brothers Hindal Mirza assured Humayun to support with his army. But Humayun's other brother named Kamran Mirza did not agree to send his army while Humayun was commanding, because Kamran Mirza wanted to take control of the throne himself. Afterwards, Kamran could not manage to take control of the power from his brother Humayun and moved to Lahore taking his army with him. Yet Humayun gathered quite sufficient forces to fight against Sher Shah Suri. Sher Khan declared himself Sultan with the victory in the battle of Chausa. He gained more power and prestige and took the title Sher Shah while Humayun and his brothers were misspending their time with futile arguments.

== Battle ==
Battle formation of the Mughals and the Sur

Following his defeat, Humayun returned to Agra, and restored order after disturbances from his brother, Hindal Mirza. The Mughal forces were rapidly organized into a combat formation. Humayun and Mirza Haider took command of the central division. Hindal was positioned on the left flank, which ran adjacent to the river, while Yadgar Nasir Mirza led the right flank. Askari was placed at the head of the vanguard. The front line was reinforced by five thousand musketeers. Notably, the Mughals had neither a reserve force nor any flanking detachments. Their effective combat strength stood at around 40,000 soldiers, though the overall force numbered closer to two lakhs. Mirza Haider put the Afghan army's strength at approximately 15,000 men. Sher Shah organized his army into seven divisions, personally commanding the center from behind a protective trench. Unlike his opponents, he maintained both a reserve force and detachments on the outer edges of each wing. His strategy centered on launching a surprise assault against Humayun's left flank, simultaneously cutting the Mughals off from the river and their supply lines. Hindal initially handled the pressure well, even managing to wound Jalal Khan during the early fighting. Sher Shah responded by sending reinforcements to his son, who then pushed forward aggressively. Meanwhile, a clash in the vanguard ended unfavorably for Askari, who was driven back by Afghan resistance. The Mughal artillery, which might have changed the outcome, never entered the fight the urgency of the battle had prevented the heavy guns from being moved into position. As Mirza Haider later observed, not a single cannon or firearm was discharged; the entire artillery arm proved completely ineffective. Faced with a relentless Afghan advance, Mughal soldiers began abandoning their positions. Despite Humayun's attempts to restore order and hold the line, the situation deteriorated beyond recovery. He was left with no option but to abandon the battlefield and retreat toward Agra. Crossing the river proved treacherous, and a significant number of his men perished in the water. By the time he reached the far bank, only a small escort remained. Further hardship followed when remnants of his party were attacked by locals near Bhogaon in the Mainpuri region. Humayun eventually made it to Agra, though barely, and with his army in ruins. The Mughal army was defeated, which led to Humayun fleeing to Sindh.

=== Pursuit of Humayun ===
Following this decisive victory, Sher Shah crossed the river and took control of Kannauj. From there, he dispatched Barmazid Gaur at the head of a substantial force with orders to track Humayun down and drive him from the subcontinent, though without engaging him in open battle. A separate army was directed to lay siege to Gwalior, and additional troops were assigned to secure Sambhal along with the territories lying east of the Ganges. Barmazid carried out his pursuit relentlessly, following Humayun all the way to Agra. Upon entering the city, his forces killed a number of Mughal soldiers who remained there. When Sher Shah himself arrived in Agra several days later, having spent the intervening time consolidating his hold over the newly conquered territories, he was displeased to learn of Barmazid's conduct. He reprimanded him sharply for the unnecessary bloodshed and subsequently assigned both Barmazid and Khattas Khan to press on with the pursuit of the former emperor. By the time Humayun managed to reach Lahore, his Afghan pursuers had already advanced as far as Sultanpur Lodi, closing the distance with alarming speed and leaving him little room to regroup or recover his position.

== Aftermath ==
Humayun became almost a fugitive after the battle of Kannauj. He and his brothers reached Agra safely but they could not stay there because Sher Shah chased them with his forces. He did not even get to Lahore when he heard about losing Delhi and Agra to Sher Shah. Sher Shah became the Emperor of Delhi and cemented the beginning of the Sur Empire. Humayun met his brothers in Lahore but they could not gather a force to fight Sher Khan because they all had different personal interests. Kamran became concerned with the safety of Punjab and Afghanistan and Hindal wanted to take control of Sindh. After the battle of Kannauj, Humayun spent the next 15 years of his life in exile.

Mirza Muhammad Haidar Dughlat, writing in the Tarikh-i-Rashidi, attributed the defeat of Humayun's army to the unsound judgment and lack of foresight of his emirs, who he believed were hardly worthy of the title at all. Having been present at the battle, he derided the Mughal forces as being severely hindered by the promotion of unqualified, worthless individuals to positions of high military authority.

== See also ==
- Bilgram
- Battle of Chausa
- Kannauj
- Sher Shah Suri
- Humayun
- Delhi Sultanate

== Bibliography ==
- Bhattacharya, Sabyasachi (2020). A Comprehensive History of Modern Bengal, 1700-1950. Asiatic Society. ISBN 978-93-89901-95-5.
