= Principality of Fergana =

Timurid principality

- 1469–1503
- Capital: Fergana
- Official languages: Chagatai Turkic
- Religion: Islam
- Government: Monarchy
- Emir
  - 1469–1494: Umar Shaikh Mirza II
  - 1494–1497: Babur
  - 1497–1504: Jahangir Mirza II
- History
  - Established: 8 February 1469
Preceded by	Succeeded by
Timurid Empire	Uzbek Khanate

The Principality of Fergana was a Timurid principality in Transoxiana (now Uzbekistan) based in the city of Fergana. The principality was ruled by Umar Shaikh Mirza II, and his sons, Babur and Jahangir Mirza II.

The principality was established following the death of Abu Sa'id Mirza and the division of his empire among his sons. Umar Shaikh's line ruled the principality for more than three decades from 1469 to 1504.

== History ==
=== Umar Shaikh ===
Abu Sa'id Mirza had re-united the Timurid Empire with the help of the Uzbek chief Abu'l-Khayr Khan, following its first division in 1449. However, he was killed by the White Sheep Turkomen and the Timurid Empire was divided once again in 1469. Umar Shaikh received Fergana upon the division of the Timurid Empire in 1469. Umar Shaikh died in a freak accident in Aksi fort, North Fergana, on 10 June 1494. It occurred when he was in his dovecote, which was built at the edge of the building, collapsed, thus making eleven-year-old Babur the ruler of Fergana.

=== Babur ===
In 1494, eleven-year-old Babur became the ruler of Fergana, in present-day Uzbekistan, after Umar Sheikh Mirza died "while tending pigeons in an ill-constructed dovecote that toppled into the ravine below the palace". During this time, two of his uncles from the neighbouring kingdoms, who were hostile to his father, and a group of nobles who wanted his younger brother Jahangir to be the ruler, threatened his succession to the throne. His uncles were relentless in their attempts to dislodge him from this position as well as from many of his other territorial possessions to come. Babur was able to secure his throne mainly because of help from his maternal grandmother, Aisan Daulat Begum, although there was also some luck involved.

Most territories around his kingdom were ruled by his relatives, who were descendants of either Timur or Genghis Khan, and were constantly in conflict. At that time, rival princes were fighting over the city of Samarkand to the west. In 1497, he besieged Samarkand for seven months before eventually gaining control over it. He was fifteen years old and for him the campaign was a huge achievement. Babur was able to hold the city despite desertions in his army, but he later fell seriously ill.

=== Jahangir ===
Meanwhile, a rebellion back home, approximately 350 kilometres (220 mi) away, amongst nobles who favoured his brother, made Jahangir Mirza II the ruler of Fergana. As Babur was marching to recover it, he lost Samarkand to a rival prince, leaving him with neither. He tried to reclaim Fergana, but lost the battle there and, escaping with a small band of followers, he wandered the mountains of central Asia and took refuge with hill tribes. By 1502, he had resigned all hopes of recovering Fergana; he was left with nothing and was forced to try his luck elsewhere. The principality was lost to the Uzbeks in 1504.

== List of emirs ==
Portrait	Name	Reign
	Umar Shaikh Mirza II	1469–1494
	Babur	1494–1497
	Jahangir Mirza II	1497–1503
