= Gulbadin =

Gulbadin گلبدین
- Gender: Male

Origin
- Language: Dari Persian
- Meaning: Flower in the wind

Gulbadin (Dari: گلبدین; Pashto: ګلبدین), also spelled Gulbuddin, is an Afghan given name meaning "flower in the wind". It may refer to:

- Gulbadan Begum (1522–1603), Mughal princess
- Gulbuddin Hekmatyar (born 1949), Afghan politician and military leader
- Gulbadin Naib (born 1991), Afghan cricketer
