= Aiman Khwajah Sultan =

- Prince of Moghulistan
- Issue: Khizr Khan
- Dynasty: Borjigin
- Father: Ahmad Alaq
- Religion: Sunni Islam

Aiman Khwajah Sultan was a Prince of Eastern Moghulistan and the son of Ahmad Alaq, who ruled as the khan of Eastern Moghulistan from 1487 to 1503.

As a grandson of Yunus Khan, Aiman Khwajah Sultan was the first cousin of the Mughal Emperor Babur, and his children married into the Mughal dynasty.

Aiman Khwajah Sultan was a direct male-line descendant of Genghis Khan, through his son Chagatai Khan.

== Issue ==
Aiman's son, Khizr Khwaja Khan was married to Gulbadan Begum, daughter of Emperor Babur and his consort Dildar Begum.

Another of Aiman's sons, Aq Sultan, was married to Habiba Begum, daughter of Kamran Mirza, son of Babur.
