= Bibi Mubarika =

Bibi Mubarika Yusufzai بي بي مبارکه یوسفزۍ
- Queen consort of Kabul; Empress consort of the Mughal Empire
- Born: 16th century Kabul
- Spouse: Babur (m. 1519; died 1530)
- House: Pashtun
- Father: Shah Mansur Yusufzai
- Religion: Islam

Bibi Mubarika Yusufzai (Pashto: بيبي مبارکه یوسفزۍ;) was the Empress consort of the Mughal Empire. She was the fifth wife of Emperor Babur, the founder of the Mughal Empire.

She is frequently mentioned in the Humayun-nama by her stepdaughter Gulbadan Begum, who calls her stepmother 'The Afghan lady' or 'Afghani Aghacha'. "Afghan" is an ethnonym referring to the Pashtun people.

== Family ==
Bibi Mubarika was the daughter of Malik Shah Mansur, a Pashtun Yusufzai chief. She was the granddaughter of Malik Sulaiman Shah, and the niece of Taus Khan.

One of her brothers named Mir Jamal accompanied Babur to India in 1525, and held high posts under Humayun and Akbar. He was given the title of Khan.

== Marriage ==
Babur married her at Kehraj on 30 January 1519. The alliance was the sign and seal of amity between him and her tribe.

== Death ==
Bibi Mubarika lived through Humayun's reign.

== In popular culture ==
Bibi Mubarika is a character in Farzana Moon's historical novel Babur: The First Moghul in India (1977).
