= Nasir Mirza =

- Timurid Prince; Mirza
- Born: c. 1487; Fergana Valley Timurid Empire
- Died: c. 1515 (aged 28); Timurid Empire
- Issue: Yadgar-Nasir Mirza
Names
- Nasir Mirza Ibn Umar Shaikh Mirza
- House: Timurid dynasty
- Father: Umar Shaikh Mirza II
- Mother: Umid
- Religion: Sunni Islam
- Military career
- Conflicts: Siege of Kabul (1504)

Nasir Mirza (b. 1487–1515 d.) was the third son of Umar Sheikh Mirza and the younger half-brother of Babur, the founder of the Mughal Empire.

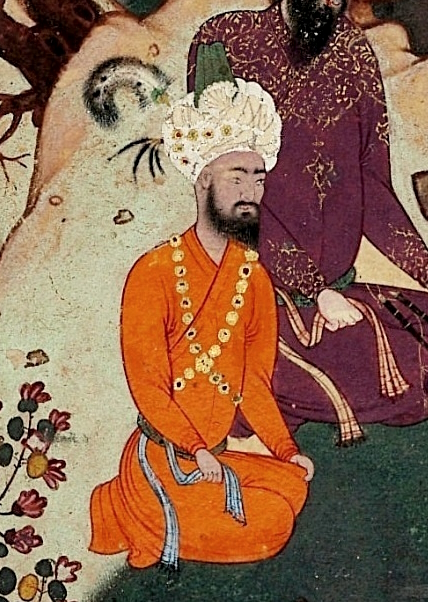
Likely contemporary depiction of Yadgar-Nasir Mirza, son of Nasir Mirza. 1546 in Kabul, by Dust Muhammad.

According to the Baburnama, Nasir Mirza was four years younger to Babur and his mother was a native of Andijan named Umid, she was a mistress of Umar Sheikh Mirza.
