= Gulchehra Begum =

- Shahzadi of the Mughal Empire
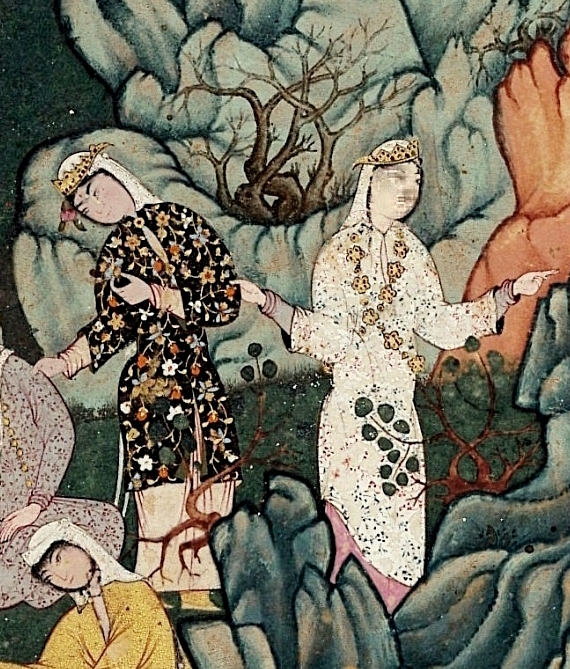
- Likely contemporary portraits of Gulbadan Begum and Gulchehra Begum, daughters of Babur, in 1546, Kabul. Dust Muhammad.
- Born: 1515; Kabul, Afghanistan
- Died: 1557 (aged 41–42)
- Spouse: Sultan Tukhta-bugha Khan (m. 1530; died 1533)
- Dynasty: Timurid
- Father: Babur
- Mother: Dildar Begum
- Religion: Sunni Islam

Gulchehra Begum (also known as Gulchehara, Gulchihra or Gulshara; c. 1515–1557) was a Mughal princess, daughter of Emperor Zāhir ud-Dīn Mohammad Babur of India, and half-sister of Emperor Humayun. Later, her half-nephew, Prince Jalal-ud-Din Mohammed ascended the imperial throne as Emperor Akbar.

== Background ==
Her name means literally "A Face like Flowers" in Persian. She was a descendant of the lines of highest Central Asian aristocracy: Timur through his son Miran Shah, and Genghis Khan through his son Chagatai Khan. Her mother was Dildar Begum and she was the sister of Hindal Mirza and Gulbadan Begum.

== Early life ==
When Princess Gulbadan was born her father, Babur, had been lord in Kabul for sometime; he was also the ruler of Kunduz and Badakhshan, had held Bajaur and Swat since 1519, and Kandahar for a year. During ten of those nineteen years, he had been styled padishah as the head of the House of Timur and for his independent sovereignty. Later Babur set out on his last expedition across the Indus to conquer an empire in India.

== Marriage ==
She married Babur's first cousin (a son of his mother's brother Ahmad), Sultan Tukhta-bugha Khan Chaghatai Mughal. The marriage was arranged by Babur, and took place at the end of 1530. She would then be about fourteen years old.

She was widowed in 1533, and nothing as to her remarriage is recorded until 1549, when she was over thirty years old. It is improbable that she remained a widow so many years. She also married with Abbas Sultan Uzbeg, just before Humayun set out on his expedition for Balkh. The bridegroom came to suspect that the Timurid army was about to act against his own people and ran away. Probably he did not take Gulchehra with him.

== Death ==
She accompanied Gulbadan and Hamida to India in 1557 and died in the same year.
