= Siege of Samarkand (1501) =

Military siege in Asia

- Part of Campaigns of Babur
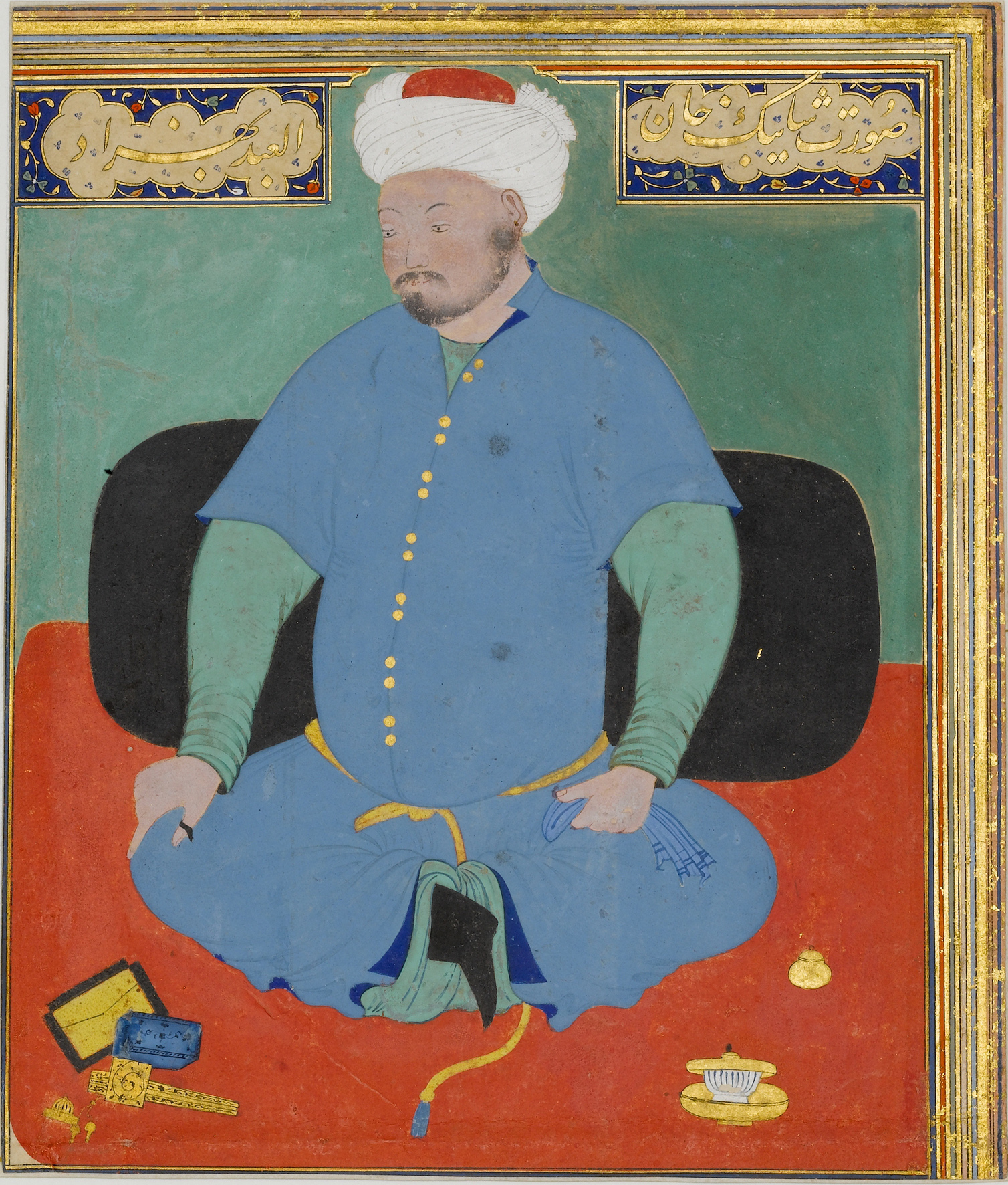
- Muhammad Shaybani
Date	1501
Location	Samarkand, Uzbekistan
Result	Initial Mughal victory, Uzbek victory for second time

Belligerents
Mughal Empire	Khanate of Bukhara

Commanders and leaders
Babur	Muhammad Shaybani

The siege of Samarkand was the third and last campaign against the city between Mughal and Uzbeks. Four years after its recapture by the forces of Babur, he lost his kingdom and capital following a rebellion. In 1501, Babur and his army besieged the city again. However, his invasion attempt was beaten off by Shaybani, an Uzbek tribal chief whose conquests were known across Central Asia.
