= Askari Mirza =

Mughal prince (1516–1558)

- Shahzada; Mirza

Ruler of Sambhal
- Reign: 1531 – 22 September 1554
- Born: 5 February 1516; Kabul (present-day Afghanistan)
- Died: 1558 (aged 41–42); Makkah, Ottoman Empire, now Saudi Arabia
- Spouse: Sultanum Begum
- House: Mughal dynasty
- Dynasty: Timurid dynasty
- Father: Babur
- Mother: Gulrukh Begum
- Religion: Sunni Islam

Muhammad Askari Mirza (Persian: محمد عسکری میرزا), sometimes known simply as Askari Mirza (5 February 1516 – 1558) was a son of Babur, the founder of the Mughal dynasty and Gulrukh Begum. Askari was also a general of the Mughal Army known for his role in the early Mughal conquests of India. Babur appointed him as governor of Sambhal where he ruled from 1531 to 1554. He died in 1558 in Makkah where he had travelled for the Hajj pilgrimage.
