= Siege of Kabul (1504) =

Part of campaigns of Babur

- Part of Campaigns of Babur
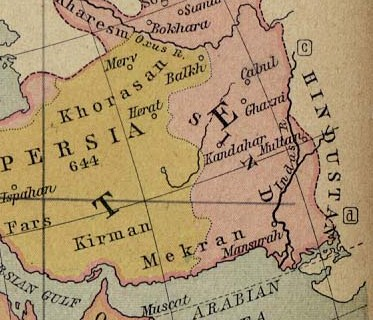
- Greater Khorasan, Kabul identified as "Cabul".
Date	October 1504
Location	Kabul, Afghanistan
Result	Timurid victory

Belligerents
Timurids	Arghuns

Commanders and leaders
Babur	Abdul Beg Arghun

In 1504, Babur besieged Kabul and took the city from the Arghuns under Mukim Beg Arghun, to become the new ruler of Kabul and Ghazni regions. The territory gave him respite from his Uzbek troubles in Central Asia. It allowed him to build his nascent kingdom into a strong and formidable power in later years, enough to conquer northern India.

== Background ==
When Abu Sa'id Mirza died, his much reduced Timurid Empire was divided among four of his sons:

- Sultan Ahmed Mirza, King of Samarkand, Bukhara and Hissar (or "Hisor," not to be confused with Hissar, India)
- Umar Shaikh Mirza II, King of Ferghana
- Sultan Mahmud Mirza, King of Balkh
- Ulugh Beg Mirza II, King of Kabul and Ghazni

Mirza Ulugh Beg, Babur's paternal uncle, the Timurid ruler of Kabul and Ghazni, had died in the year 1501 CE, leaving his son Abdal-Razzak Mirza, who was still young, in charge of the country. But power was usurped by one of his ministers, Shirim Zikr. A conspiracy, headed by Muhammad Qasim Beg and Yunis Ali, was formed against the minister which succeeded in killing him and capturing the seat of government. However, anarchy reigned in the region and the power vacuum was filled by one Mukim Beg Arghun. He was the son of Dhul-Nun Beg Arghun and brother of Shah Beg Arghun. Mukim availing himself of this situation of things, marched without orders from the Garmsir, which he held for his father, who in turn served Sultan Husayn Mirza Bayqara and appeared suddenly before Kabul, which opened its gates. Dhul-Nun Beg Arghun, without professing to approve of the proceedings of Mukim, sanctioned his retaining possession of his conquest. Abdal-Razak Mirza had retired among the hills, and was still making ineffectual efforts for the recovery of his capital, when Babur himself escaping the Uzbek, Shaybani Khan, entered the territories of Khusroe Shah. Shaybani Khan had conquered Samarkand and Bukhara, Ferghana and Uratippa, Tashkent and Shahrukhiya; Sultan Husayn Mirza Bayqara governed Khorasan; Khusroe Shah still held Hissar, Khotlan, Kunduz, and Badakhshan; and Dhul-Nun Beg Arghun, though he acknowledged Sultan Husayn Mirza Bayqara, had almost independent power in Kandahar and Zamindawar, Farah, Nimruz, Helmand, the Garmsir, and great part of Sistan, and the country south of Kandahar.

During Babur's travels through Khusroe Shah's territories, the Moghuls in Khusroe's service including his brother deserted him and joined Babur. With this army he marched on Kabul and besieged the city.

== Siege ==
Jahangir Mirza II commanded the right wing and was placed on the site of the Charbagh. Nasir Mirza was commander of the left wing and was positioned near the meadows of the tomb of Qutlugh Qadam Khan. Babur with the main army halted between Haider Taki's garden and the tomb of Kul Bayezid. Negotiations began with Mukim Beg to surrender but he resorted to delaying tactics, expecting succor from his father and brother. Babur pushed forward and the siege became more severe with few engagements. Eventually Mukim Beg negotiated a surrender and was allowed to leave with his family. The region of Kabul and Ghazni were thus conquered without much severe resistance. A more accurate description of the siege is given in the book The Memoirs of Babur (Baburnama).

== See also ==
- Baburnama – Autobiography of Mughal Emperor Babur
- Tarikh-i-Rashidi – A history of the Moghuls of Central Asia
