= Babur =

Mughal emperor from 1526 to 1530

Babur ببر
- Ghazi
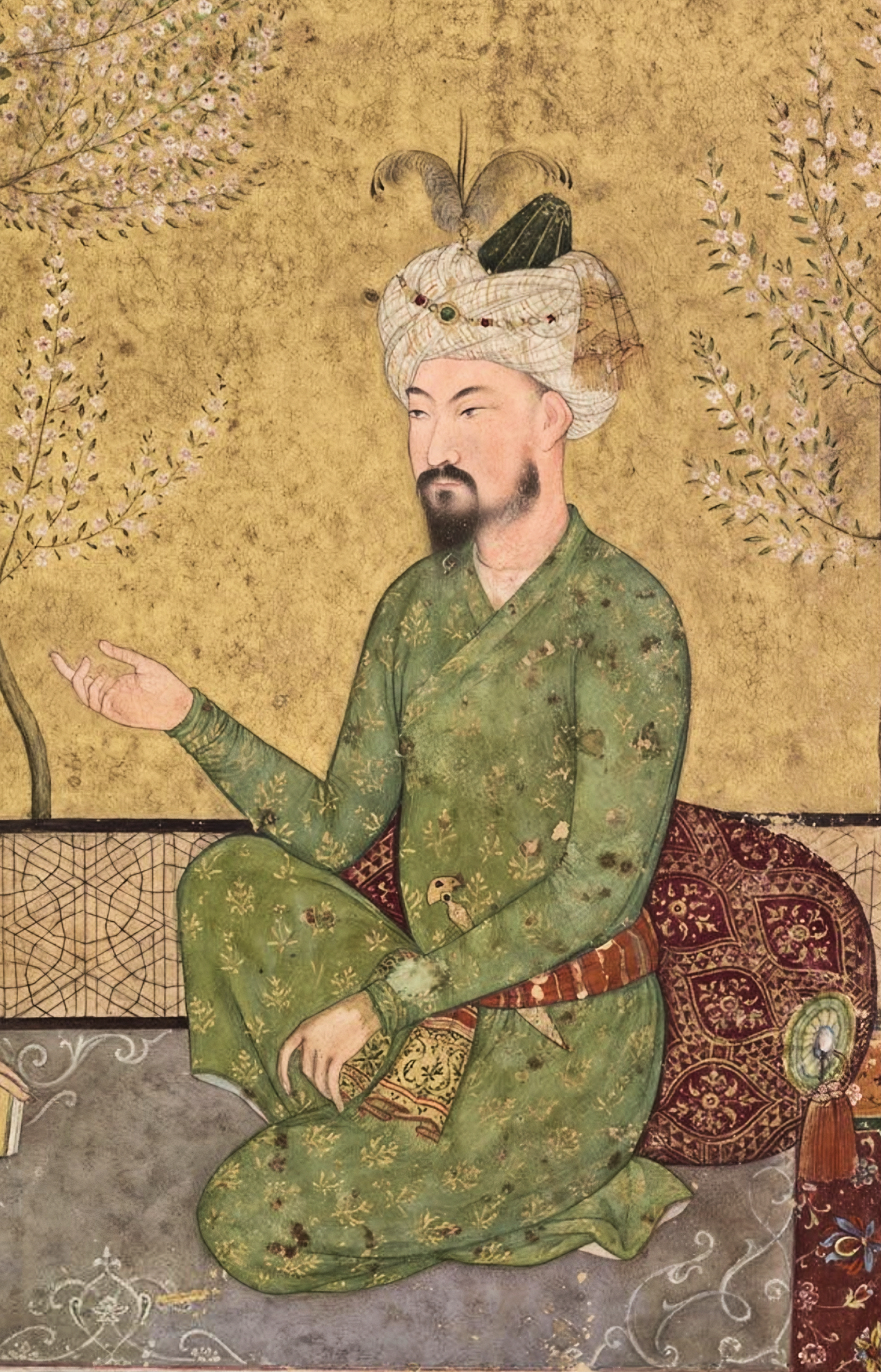
- Portrait of Babur in the Late Shah Jahan Album, painted c. 1640. Smithsonian Collections.

Mughal Emperor (Padishah)
- Reign: 21 April 1526 – 26 December 1530
- Predecessor: Position established; Ibrahim Lodi (as Sultan of Delhi)
- Successor: Humayun

Emir of Kabul
- Reign: October 1504 – 21 April 1526
- Predecessor: Mukim Beg
- Successor: Himself as the Mughal Emperor

Emir of Fergana
- Reign: 10 June 1494 – February 1497
- Predecessor: Umar Shaikh Mirza II
- Successor: Jahangir Mirza II

Emir of Samarkand
- Reign: November 1496 – February 1497
- Predecessor: Baysonqor Mirza
- Successor: Ali Mirza
- Born: 14 February 1483; Andijan, Timurid Empire
- Died: 26 December 1530 (aged 47); Agra, Mughal Empire
- Burial: Gardens of Babur, Kabul, Afghanistan
- Consort: Maham Begum (m. 1506)
- Wives more...: Aisha Sultan Begum (m. 1499; div. 1503) Zainab Sultan Begum (m. 1504; died 1506) Masuma Sultan Begum (m. 1507; died 1509) Bibi Mubarika (m. 1519)
- Issue more...: Fakhr-un-Nissa Begum; Humayun; Masuma Sultan Begum; Kamran Mirza; Askari Mirza; Hindal Mirza; Gulbadan Begum; Gulchehra Begum
Names
- Zahīr ud-Dīn Muhammad Bābur
Posthumous name
- Firdaws Makani (Dwelling in Paradise)
- House: Mughal
- Dynasty: Timurid
- Father: Umar Shaikh Mirza II
- Mother: Qutlugh Nigar Khanum
- Religion: Sunni Islam
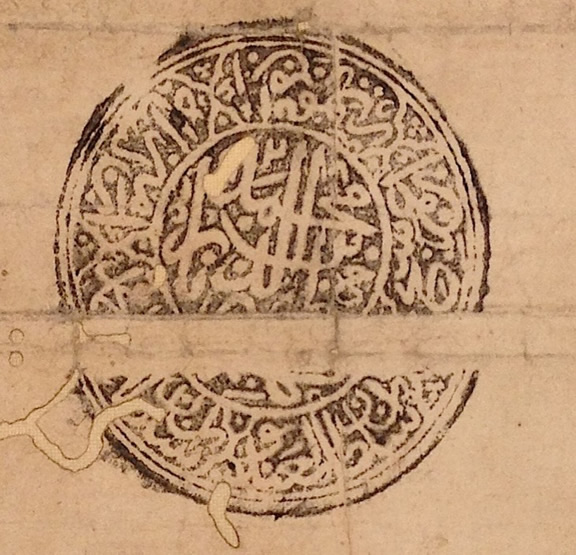
- Seal
- Military career
- Conflicts: In Central Asia; Samarkand (c. 1490); Samarkand (1497); Samarkand (1501); Sar-e-Pul (1501); Akhsil (1503); Kabul (1504); Hazaras (1505); Qalat (1506); Eastern Afghanistan (1507); Ab Darrah Pass (1511); Ghazdewan (1512); In Indian Subcontinent; First expedition of India (1505); Bajaur (1519); Hisar Firoza (1526); Panipat (1526); Khanwa (1527); Chanderi (1528); Ghaghra (1529)

Babur (Persian: ببر, Persian: [bɑː.βuɾ]; 14 February 1483 – 26 December 1530; born Zahīr ud-Dīn Muhammad) was the founder of the Mughal Empire in South Asia. He was a descendant of Timur and Genghis Khan through his father and mother, respectively. He was also given the posthumous name of Firdaws Makani ('Dwelling in Paradise').

Born in Andijan in the Fergana Valley (now in Uzbekistan), Babur was the eldest son of Umar Shaikh Mirza II (1456–1494, Timurid governor of Fergana from 1469 to 1494) and a great-great-great-grandson of Timur (1336–1405). He ascended the throne of Fergana in its capital, Akhsikath, in 1494 at the age of twelve and had to put down a rebellion. He conquered Samarkand two years later, only to lose Fergana soon after. In his attempt to reconquer Fergana, he lost control of Samarkand as well. In 1501, he briefly recaptured both areas but his attempt failed when the Uzbek prince Muhammad Shaybani defeated him and founded the Khanate of Bukhara.

In 1504, the exiled Babur conquered Kabul, which was under the putative rule of Abd ur-Razaq Mirza, the infant heir of his uncle Ulugh Beg II. Forming a partnership with the Safavid emperor Ismail I he reconquered parts of Turkestan in 1511, including Samarkand, only to again lose it and the other newly conquered lands to the Shaybanids.

After losing Samarkand for the third time, Babur turned his attention to India and employed aid from the neighbouring Safavid and Ottoman empires. He defeated Ibrahim Lodi, the Sultan of Delhi, at the First Battle of Panipat in 1526 and founded the Mughal Empire. Before the defeat of Lodi at Panipat, the Sultanate of Delhi had been a spent force, long in a state of decline.

The ruler of the adjacent Kingdom of Mewar, Rana Sanga, advanced on Babur with a grand coalition of Rajput and Afghan warlords, engaging Babur in the Battle of Khanwa. Babur achieved a decisive victory due to his skillful troop positioning and use of gunpowder. The battle, one of the most decisive events in Indian history, was a watershed event in the Mughal conquest of northern India.

Religiously, Babur started his life as a staunch Sunni Muslim, but he underwent significant evolution. He became more tolerant as he conquered new territories and grew older, allowing other religions to peacefully coexist in his empire and at his court. He also displayed a certain attraction to theology, poetry, geography, history, and biology — disciplines he promoted at his court — earning him a frequent association with representatives of the Timurid Renaissance. His religious and philosophical stances are characterized as humanistic.

Babur married several times. Notable among his children were Humayun, Kamran Mirza, Hindal Mirza, Masuma Sultan Begum, and the author Gulbadan Begum. Babur died in 1530 in Agra, with Humayun succeeding him. He was first buried in Agra, but, as per his wishes, his remains were moved to Kabul and reburied. Babur is regarded as a national hero in Uzbekistan and Kyrgyzstan. He wrote the Baburnama in Chaghatai Turkic; it was translated into Persian during the reign (1556–1605) of his grandson, the emperor Akbar. Many of his poems have become popular folk songs. A devoted garden-builder, Babur is also credited with introducing the formal charbagh to the plains of northern India.

== Name ==
Ẓahīr-ud-Dīn is Arabic for "Defender of the Faith" (of Islam), and Muhammad honours the Islamic prophet. The name was chosen for Babur by the Sufi saint Khwaja Ahrar, who was the spiritual master of his father. The difficulty of pronouncing the name for his Central Asian Turco-Mongol army may have been responsible for the greater popularity of his nickname Babur, also variously spelled Baber, Babar, and Bābor. The name is generally taken in reference to the Persian word babur (ببر), meaning "tiger" or "panther". The word repeatedly appears in Ferdowsi's Shahnameh and was borrowed into the Turkic languages of Central Asia.

== Background ==
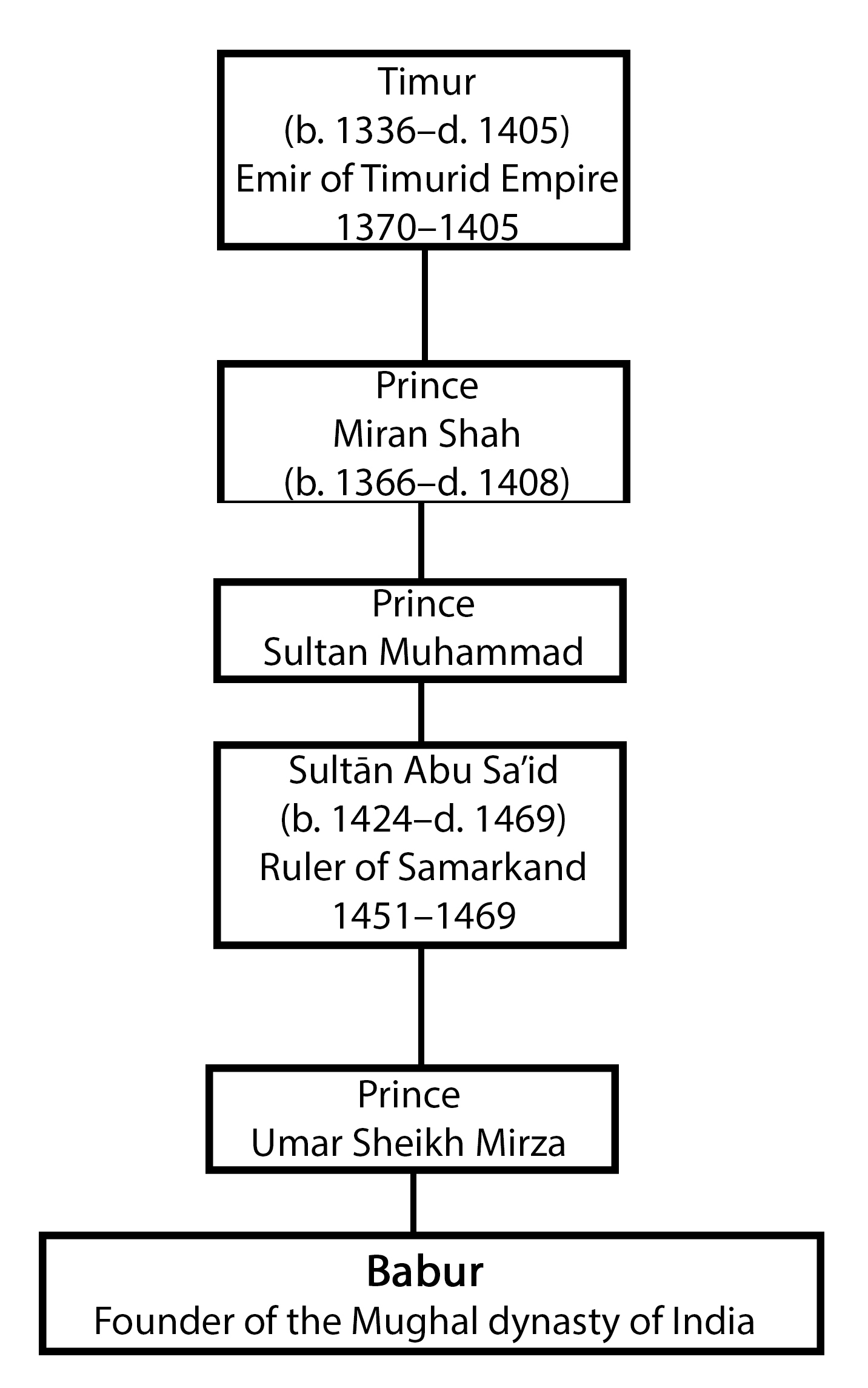
Babur Family Tree

Babur's memoirs form the main source for details of his life. They are known as the Baburnama and were written in Chagatai, his first language, though, according to Dale, "his Turkic prose is highly Persianized in its sentence structure, morphology or word formation and vocabulary." Baburnama was translated into Persian during the rule of Babur's grandson Akbar.

Babur was born on 14 February 1483 in the city of Andijan, Fergana Valley, contemporary Uzbekistan. He was the eldest son of Umar Shaikh Mirza II, ruler of the Fergana Valley, the son of Abū Saʿīd Mirza (and grandson of Miran Shah, who was himself son of Timur) and his wife Qutlugh Nigar Khanum, daughter of Yunus Khan, the ruler of Moghulistan and a descendant of Genghis Khan.

Babur hailed from the Turkic Barlas tribe, which was of Mongol origin and had embraced the Turco-Persian tradition. They had also converted to Islam centuries earlier and resided in Turkestan and Khorasan.

Aside from the Chaghatai Turkic, Babur was equally fluent in Classical Persian, the lingua franca of the Timurid elite.

Some of Babur's relatives, such as his uncles Mahmud Khan and Ahmad Khan, continued to identify as Mongols and allowed him to use their Mongol troops to help recover his fortunes in the turbulent years that followed.

Hence, Babur, though nominally a Mongol (or Moghul in Persian language), drew much of his support from the local Turkic and Iranian people of Central Asia, and his army was diverse in its ethnic makeup. It included Sarts, Tajiks, ethnic Afghans, Arabs, as well as Barlas and Chaghatayid Turko-Mongols from Central Asia.

== Ruler of Central Asia ==
=== As Timurid ruler of Fergana ===
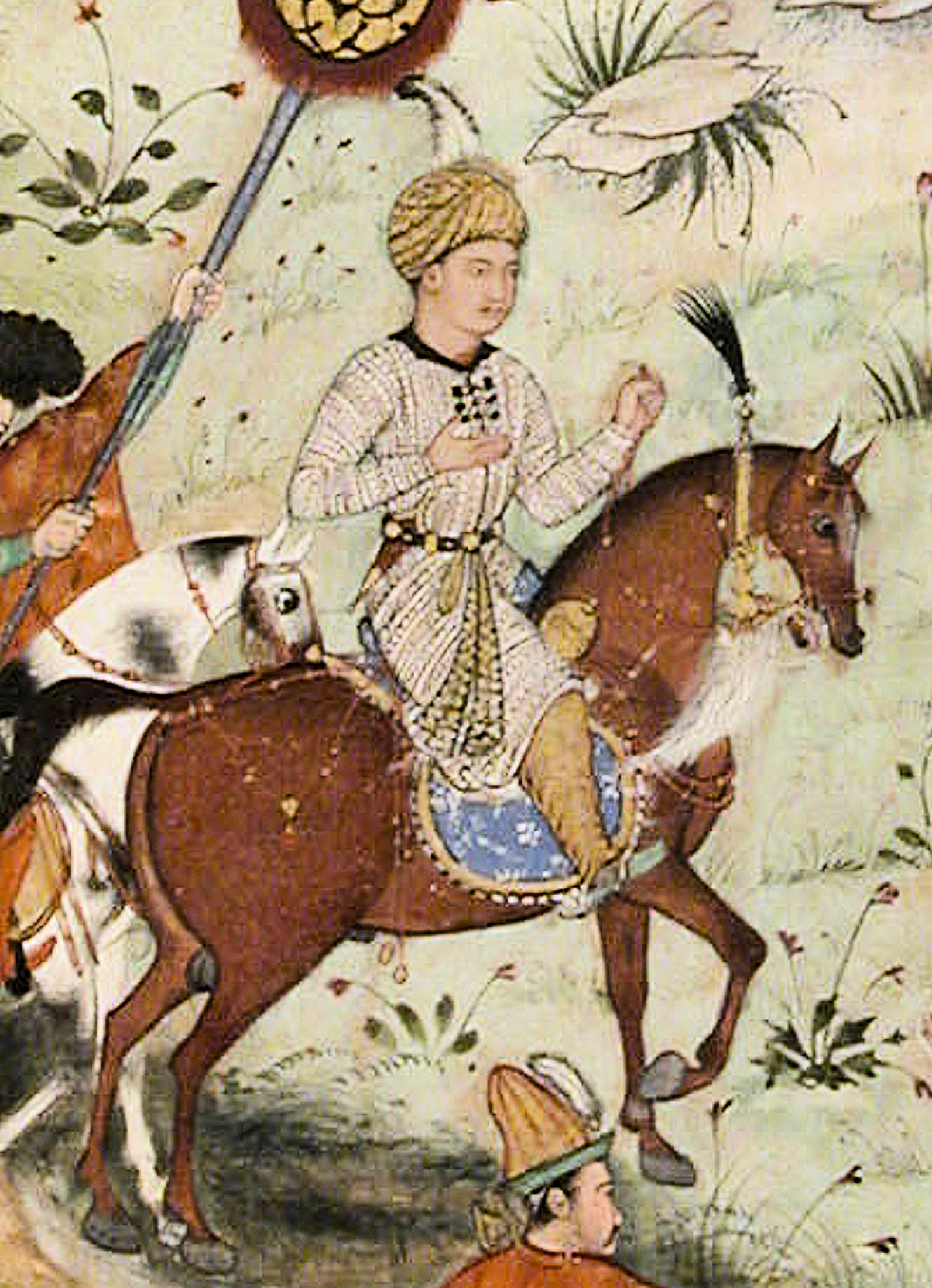
Babur as the young Emir of Fergana, joining forces with Sultan Ali Mirza in 1497 near Samarqand. Painted c. 1589 (Baburnama).

In 1494, eleven-year-old Babur became the Timurid ruler of Fergana, in present-day Uzbekistan, after his father, Umar Sheikh Mirza, died "while tending pigeons in an ill-constructed dovecote that toppled into the ravine below the palace". During this time, two of his uncles from the neighbouring kingdoms, who were hostile to his father, and a group of nobles who wanted his younger brother Jahangir to be the ruler, threatened his succession to the throne. His uncles were relentless in their attempts to dislodge him from this position as well as from many of his other territorial possessions to come. Babur was able to secure his throne mainly because of help from his maternal grandmother, Aisan Daulat Begum, although there was also some luck involved.

Most territories around his kingdom were ruled by his relatives, who were descendants of either Timur or Genghis Khan, and were constantly in conflict. At that time, rival princes were fighting over the city of Samarkand to the west, which was ruled by his paternal cousin. Babur had a great ambition to capture the city.

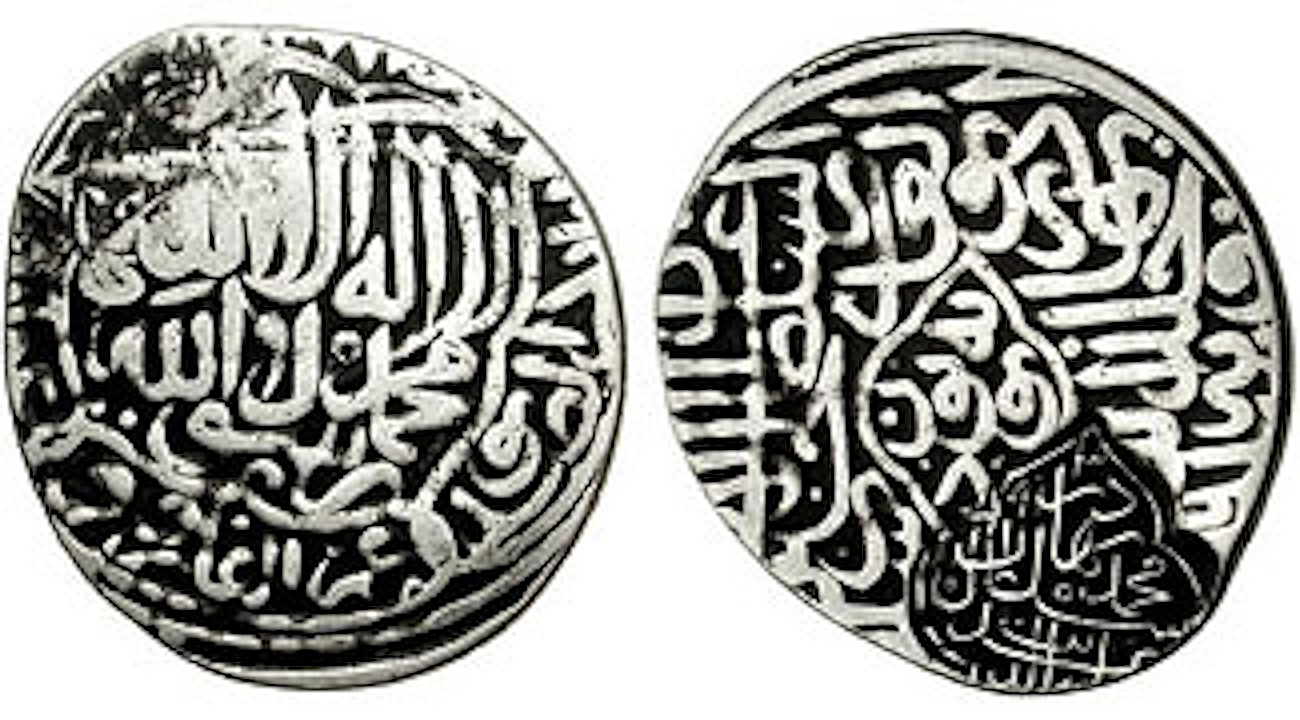
Coinage of Babur as Sultan of Ferghana, struck during his occupation of Samarkand in 1497-1498 (AH 903). It is a coin of the Timurid sultan Husayn Baiqara, countermarked with the Persian legend adl Sultan Zahir al-Din Muhammad Bahadur in a leaf-shaped punch.

In 1497, he besieged Samarkand for seven months before eventually gaining control over it. He was fifteen years old, and for him, the campaign was a huge achievement. Babur was able to hold the city despite desertions in his army, but he later fell seriously ill. Meanwhile, a rebellion back home, approximately 350 kilometres (220 mi) away, amongst nobles who favoured his brother, robbed him of Fergana. As he was marching to recover it, he left Samarkand to Sultan Ali Mirza, leaving him with neither territory in his possession. He had held Samarkand for 100 days, and he considered this defeat as his biggest loss, obsessing over it even later in his life after his conquests in India.

For three years, Babur concentrated on building a strong army, recruiting widely amongst the Tajiks of Badakhshan in particular. In 1500–1501, he again laid siege to Samarkand, and indeed he took the city briefly, but he was in turn besieged by his most formidable rival, Muhammad Shaybani, Khan of the Uzbeks. The situation became such that Babur was compelled to give his sister, Khanzada, to Shaybani in marriage as part of the peace settlement. Only after this were Babur and his troops allowed to depart the city in safety. Samarkand, his lifelong obsession, was thus lost again. He then tried to reclaim Fergana but lost the battle there also, and, escaping with a small band of followers, he wandered the mountains of central Asia and took refuge with hill tribes. By 1502, he had resigned all hopes of recovering Fergana; he was left with nothing and was forced to try his luck elsewhere. He finally went to Tashkent, which was ruled by his maternal uncle, but he found himself less than welcome there. Babur wrote, "During my stay in Tashkent, I endured much poverty and humiliation. No country, or hope of one!" Thus, during the ten years since becoming the ruler of Fergana, Babur suffered many short-lived victories and was without shelter and in exile, aided by friends and peasants.

=== At Kabul ===
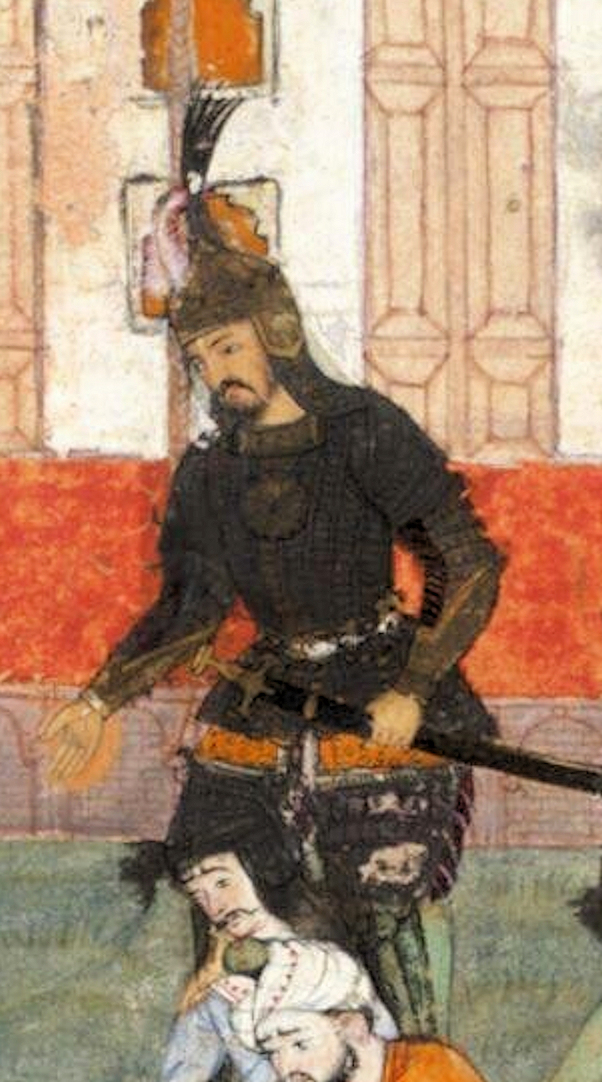
Babur in armour, April–May 1507 in Kabul. Baburnama (1589).

Kabul was ruled by Babur's paternal uncle Ulugh Beg II, who died in 1502 leaving only an infant as heir. The city was then claimed by Mukim Beg of Arghun dynasty, who was considered to be a usurper and was opposed by the local populace. In October 1504, Babur was able to cross the snowy Hindu Kush mountains and capture Kabul from the remaining Arghun chieftains, who were forced to retreat to Kandahar. With this move, he gained a new kingdom, re-established his fortunes, and would remain its ruler until 1526. In 1505, because of the low revenue generated by his new mountain kingdom, Babur began his first expedition to India; in his memoirs, he wrote, "My desire for Hindustan had been constant. It was in the month of Shaban, the Sun being in Aquarius, that we rode out of Kabul for Hindustan". It was a brief raid across the Khyber Pass.

In the same year, Babur united with Sultan Husayn Mirza Bayqarah of Herat, a fellow Timurid and distant relative, against their common enemy, the Uzbek Shaybani. However, this venture did not take place because Husayn Mirza died in 1506, and his two sons were reluctant to go to war. Babur instead stayed at Herat after being invited by the two Mirza brothers. It was then the cultural capital of the eastern Muslim world. Though he was disgusted by the vices and luxuries of the city, he marvelled at the intellectual abundance there, which he stated was "filled with learned and matched men". He became acquainted with the work of the Chagatai poet Mir Ali Shir Nava'i, who encouraged the use of Chagatai as a literary language. Nava'i's proficiency with the language, which he is credited with founding, may have influenced Babur in his decision to use it for his memoirs. He spent two months there before being forced to leave because of diminishing resources; it later was overrun by Shaybani, and the Mirzas fled. Babur became the only reigning Timurid ruler after the loss of Herat, with the exception of surviving Uways Khan Mirza in Badakhshan, and many princes sought refuge with him at Kabul because of Shaybani's invasion in the west.

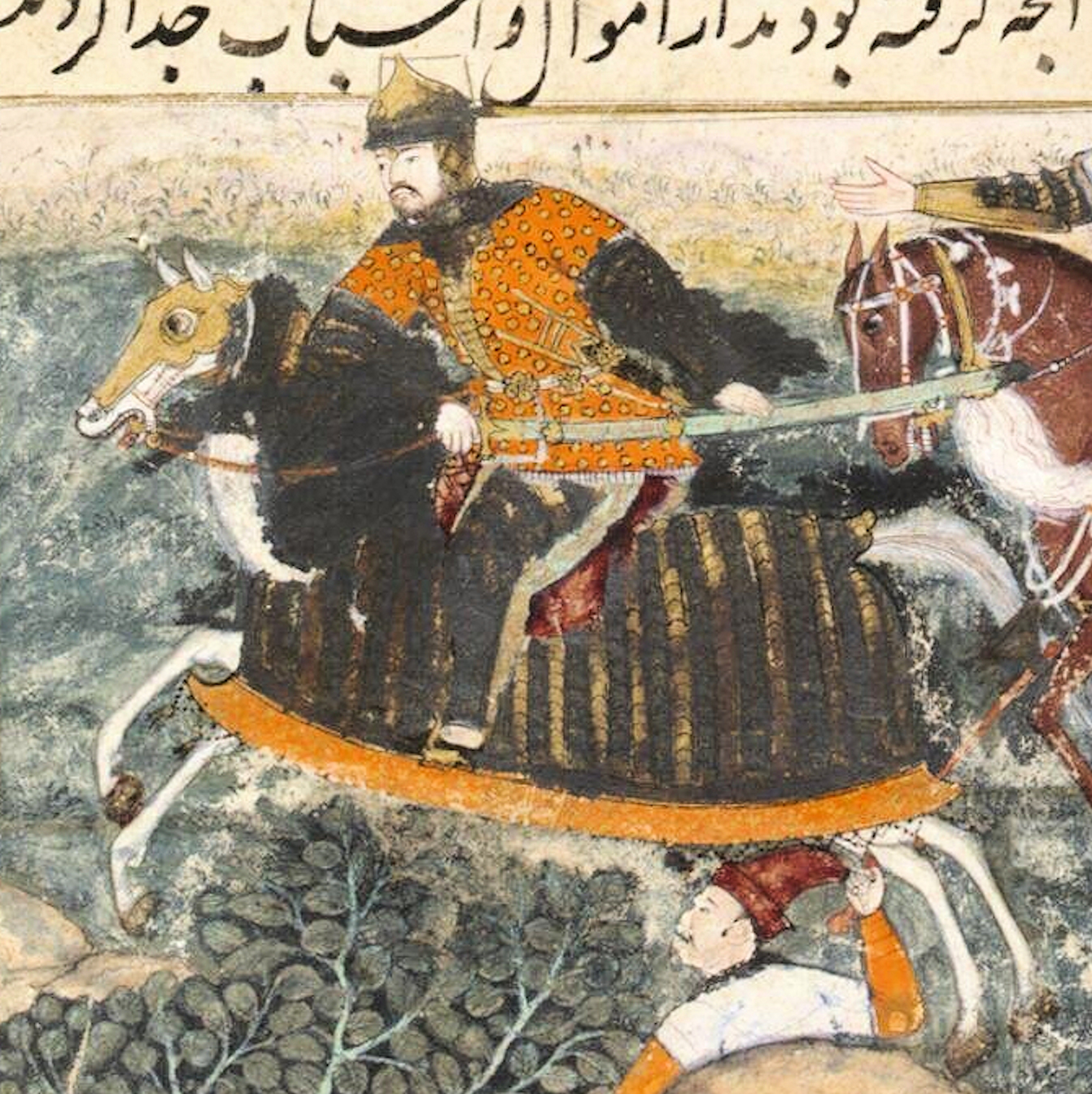
Barbur leading an assault against the Hazaras in 1507. Baburnama (1589)

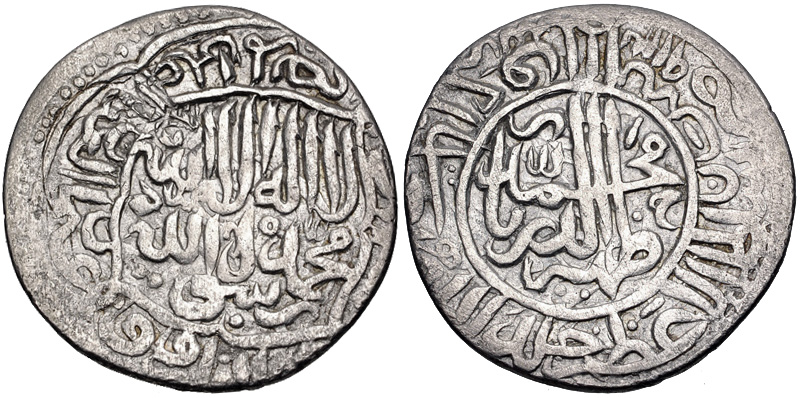
Coin minted by Babur during his time as ruler of Kabul. Dated 1507/8

He thus assumed the title of Padshah (emperor) among the Timurids—though this title was insignificant since most of his ancestral lands were taken, Kabul itself was in danger, and Shaybani continued to be a threat. Babur prevailed during a potential rebellion in Kabul, but two years later a revolt among some of his leading generals drove him out of Kabul. Escaping with very few companions, Babur soon returned to the city, capturing Kabul again and regaining the allegiance of the rebels. Meanwhile, Shaybani was defeated and killed by Ismail I, Shah of Shi'a Safavid Persia, in 1510.

Babur and the remaining Timurids used this opportunity to reconquer their ancestral territories. Over the following few years, Babur and Shah Ismail formed a partnership in an attempt to take over parts of Central Asia. In return for Ismail's assistance, Babur permitted the Safavids to act as a suzerain over him and his followers. Thus, in 1511, after leaving his brother Nasir Mirza to rule Kabul, he managed to take Samarkand for the third time; he also took Bukhara but lost both again to the Uzbeks in 1512. Shah Ismail reunited Babur with his sister Khānzāda, who had been imprisoned by and forced to marry the recently deceased Shaybani. Babur returned to Kabul after three years in 1514. The following 11 years of his rule mainly involved dealing with relatively insignificant rebellions from Afghan tribes, his nobles, and relatives, in addition to conducting raids across the eastern mountains. Babur began to modernise and train his army despite it being, for him, relatively peaceful times. After the siege and capture of Bajaur in 1519, he married Bibi Mubarika, the daughter of Yousafzai chief Shah Mansur. In 1521, he took control of Badakhshan after the death of Uways Mirza. In 1522, he besieged and annexed Kandahar from the Arghun dynasty. The Arghuns were forced to relocate to Sindh.

== Formation of the Mughal Empire ==
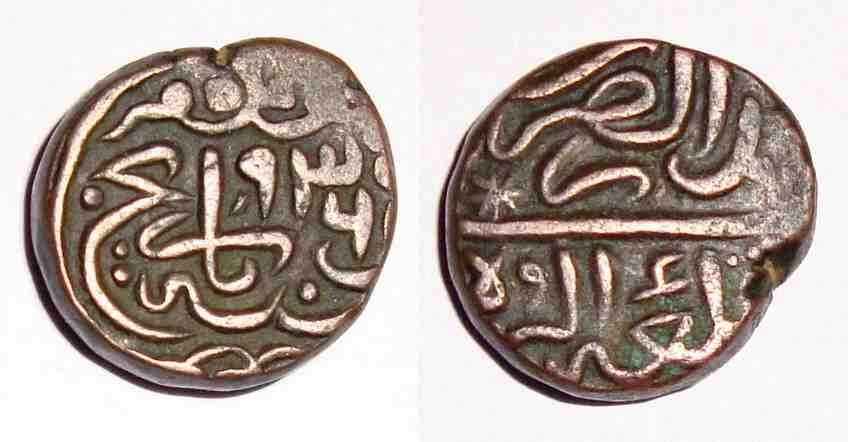
Babur's coin, based on Bahlol Lodhi's standard, Qila Agra, AH 936

Babur writes in his memoir:

From the time of the revered Prophet down till now three men from that side have conquered and ruled Hindūstān. Maḥmūd Ghāzī was the first, who and whose descendants sat long on the seat of government in Hindūstān. Shihābu'd-dīn of Ghūr was the second, whose slaves and dependants royally shepherded this realm for many years. I am the third.

Babur still wanted to escape from the Uzbeks, and he chose India as a refuge instead of Badakhshan, which was to the north of Kabul. He wrote, "In the presence of such power and potency, we had to think of some place for ourselves and, at this crisis and in the crack of time there was, put a wider space between us and the strong foeman." After his third loss of Samarkand, Babur gave full attention to the conquest of North India, launching a campaign; he reached the Chenab River, in Punjab, Pakistan, in 1519. Until 1524, his aim was to only expand his rule to Punjab, mainly to fulfill the legacy of his ancestor Timur, since it used to be part of his empire. At the time, parts of North India were part of the Delhi Sultanate, ruled by Ibrahim Lodi of the Lodi dynasty, but the sultanate was crumbling and there were many defectors. Babur received invitations from Daulat Khan Lodi, Governor of Punjab, and Ala-ud-Din, uncle of Ibrahim. He sent an ambassador to Ibrahim, claiming himself the rightful heir to the throne, but the ambassador was detained at Lahore, Punjab, and released months later.

Babur started for Lahore in 1524 but found that Daulat Khan Lodi had been driven out by forces sent by Ibrahim Lodi. When Babur arrived at Lahore, the Lodi army marched out, and his army was routed. In response, Babur burned Lahore for two days, then marched to Dipalpur, placing Alam Khan, another rebel uncle of Lodi, as governor. Alam Khan was quickly overthrown and fled to Kabul. In response, Babur supplied Alam Khan with troops who later joined up with Daulat Khan Lodi, and together with about 30,000 troops, they besieged Ibrahim Lodi at Delhi. The sultan easily defeated and drove off Alam's army, and Babur realised that he would not allow him to occupy the Punjab.

=== First Battle of Panipat ===
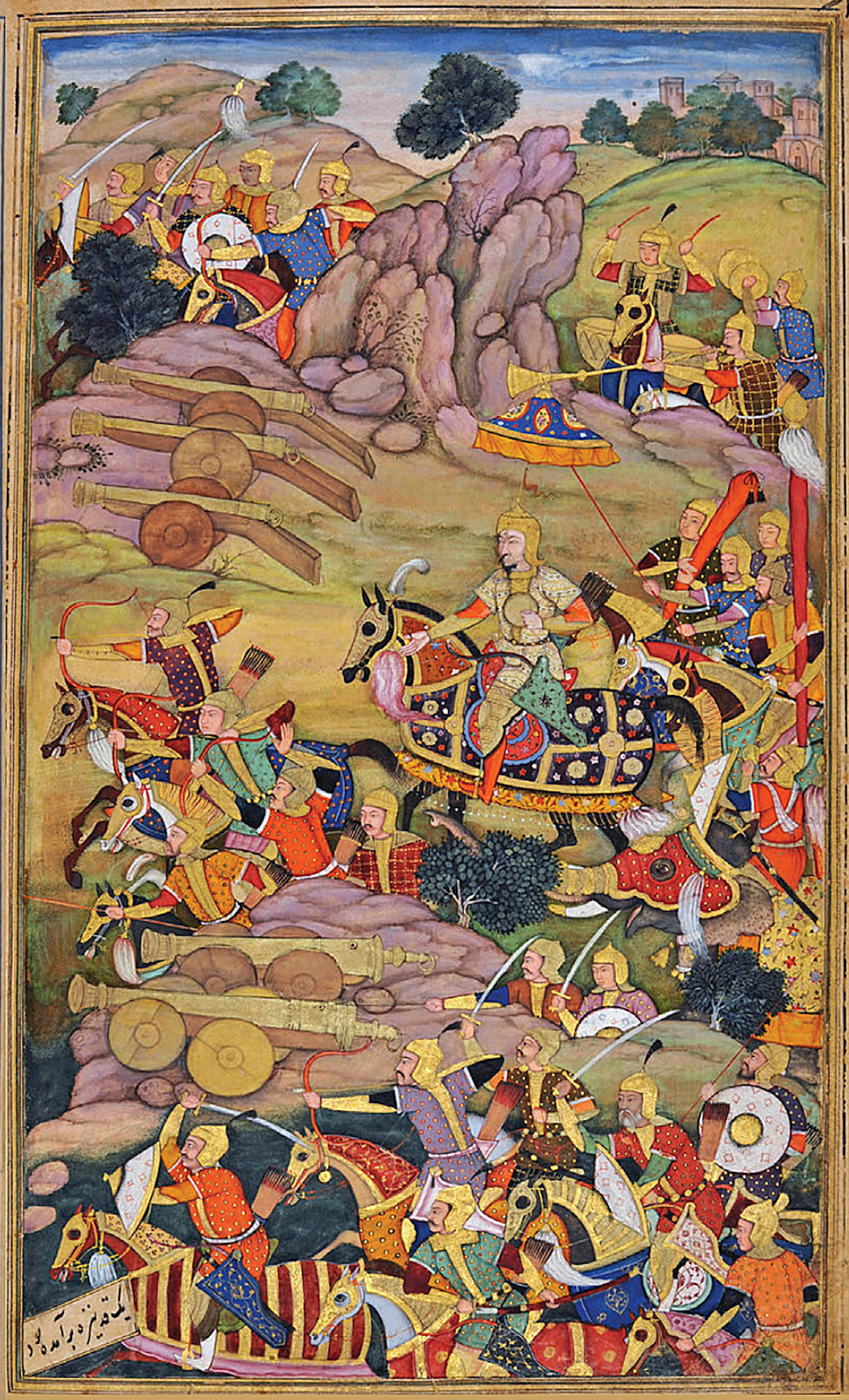
Mughal artillery and troops in action during the Battle of Panipat (1526)

In November 1525, Babur got news at Peshawar that Daulat Khan Lodi had switched sides, and Babur drove out Ala-ud-Din. Babur then marched onto Lahore to confront Daulat Khan Lodi, only to see Daulat's army melt away at their approach. Daulat surrendered and was pardoned. Thus, within three weeks of crossing the Indus River, Babur had become the master of Punjab.

Babur marched on to Delhi via Sirhind. He reached Panipat on 20 April 1526 and there met Ibrahim Lodi's numerically superior army of about 100,000 soldiers and 1,000 elephants. In the battle that began on the following day, Babur used the tactic of Tulugma, encircling Ibrahim Lodi's army and forcing it to face artillery fire directly, as well as frightening its war elephants. Across the front of his position, Babur lashed together some 700 baggage carts with rawhide ropes in what he called the "Ottoman" (Rūmī) fashion, leaving gaps through which his cavalry could charge, and stationed his matchlock-men and field guns behind this barricade; the artillery was directed by two Ottoman master-gunners, Ustad Ali Quli and Mustafa Rumi. Ibrahim Lodi died during the battle, thus ending the Lodi dynasty.

Babur wrote in his memoirs about his victory:

By the grace of the Almighty God, this difficult task was made easy to me and that mighty army, in the space of a half a day was laid in dust.

After the battle, Babur occupied Delhi, Gwalior, and Agra, took the throne of Lodi, and laid the foundation for the eventual rise of Mughal rule in India. However, before he became North India's ruler, he had to fend off challengers, such as Rana Sanga.

Many of Babur's men allegedly wanted to leave India due to its harsh climate, but Babur motivated them to stay and expand his empire. Many of his retainers returned to Kabul, including his close friend Khwaja Kalan.

=== Battle of Khanwa ===
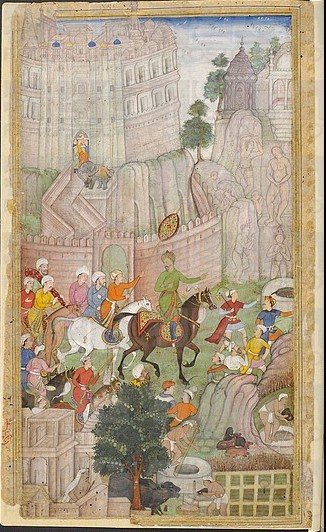
Babur encounters the Jain Colossal at the Urvahi valley in Gwalior in 1527. He ordered them to be destroyed

The Battle of Khanwa was fought between Babur and the Rajput ruler of Mewar, Rana Sanga, on 16 March 1527. Rana Sanga wanted to overthrow Babur, whom he considered to be a foreigner ruling in India, and also to extend the Rajput territories by annexing Delhi and Agra. He was supported by a mixed group of Afghan chiefs composed of former Lodi loyalists and local warlords. Upon receiving news of Rana Sangha's advance towards Agra, Babur, after annexing Gwalior and Bayana, took a defensive position at Khanwa (currently in the Indian state of Rajasthan), from where he hoped to launch a counterattack later. According to K. V. Krishna Rao, Babur won the battle because of his "superior generalship" and modern tactics; the battle was one of the first in India that featured cannons and muskets. Rao also notes that Rana Sanga faced "treachery" when the Hindu chief Silhadi joined Babur's army with a garrison of 6,000 soldiers.

On the eve of the battle, with his troops unsettled by an astrologer's prophecy of defeat, Babur recast the campaign in religious terms. He denounced Rana Sanga as a kafir (infidel), proclaimed the coming fight a jihad, and in a public ceremony renounced wine for good, ordering his gold and silver drinking vessels broken up and the fragments distributed to the poor. The decree issued for the occasion, drafted by his secretary Shaikh Zain, likened the smashing of the wine vessels to the breaking of idols, and after the victory Babur assumed the title of ghazi and composed a verse celebrating his triumph over the unbelievers. As at Panipat, his field guns were arranged behind a screen of linked carts; the Ottoman gunner Mustafa Rumi commanded the culverins whose fire helped break the Rajput cavalry charges.

=== Battle of Chanderi ===
The Battle of Chanderi took place the year after the Battle of Khanwa. On receiving news that Rana Sanga had made preparations to renew the conflict with him, Babur decided to isolate the Rana by defeating one of his staunchest allies, Medini Rai, who was the ruler of Malwa.

Upon reaching Chanderi, on 20 January 1528, Babur offered Shamsabad to Medini Rai in exchange for Chanderi as a peace overture, but the offer was rejected. The outer fortress of Chanderi was taken by Babur's army at night, and the next morning the upper fort was captured. Babur himself expressed surprise that the upper fort had fallen within an hour of the final assault. Seeing no hope of victory, Medini Rai organized a jauhar, during which women and children within the fortress immolated themselves. A small number of soldiers also collected in Medini Rai's house and killed each other in collective suicide. This sacrifice does not seem to have impressed Babur, who did not express a word of admiration for the enemy in his autobiography.

=== Battle of Ghaghra ===
By 1529, most of the major oppositions in Hindustan had either been defeated or forced into submission. Babur turned his attention to consolidating control over the eastern Gangetic plain by eliminating the remaining Afghan Lodi loyalists and pursuing the traitors Biban and Bayezid. In the spring of 1529, Babur marched down the Ganges to engage the eastern Afghan Confederacy under Sultan Mahmud Lodi and the Sultanate of Bengal under Sultan Nusrat Shah.

The Battle of Ghaghra (May 1529) was the final major conflict fought by Babur as part of his struggle to consolidate power over Hindustan. The Mughal forces, employing field artillery and coordinated cavalry manoeuvres, defeated the Afghan–Bengal coalition. Following the battle, Nusrat Shah sued for peace, and Mahmud Lodi's influence collapsed, effectively ending organized Afghan resistance to Babur.

== Administration and the Indian empire ==
Babur's principal difficulty after Panipat was not winning territory but holding it. Many of his Central Asian followers regarded Hindustan as a hot and alien land fit only for plunder and pressed to return to the cool of Kabul, and the hot-weather mortality, together with his failure to distribute the spoils quickly enough, briefly sapped their morale. Babur answered with conspicuous generosity. His daughter Gulbadan Begum recalled that "the treasures of five kings fell into his hands" and that "he gave everything away": nobles, soldiers, traders, and scribes received bounties, gifts were sent to relatives and holy men in Samarkand and Khurasan, and every person in the country of Kabul was given a silver coin. This open-handedness, in keeping with his cultivated image as a qalandar (a wandering, open-handed dervish), helped bind his following to him.

Babur made few structural changes to the government he had inherited. He kept Agra as his capital, distributed the conquered districts as revenue assignments to his commanders and to the Afghan chiefs who submitted, and left local zamindars and much of the Lodi fiscal machinery in place. His lasting contribution was military rather than institutional: he brought field artillery and the mobile, gunpowder-equipped tactics he had absorbed from the Ottomans and from Central Asian warfare into northern India, and gave the cavalry arm a prominence that the elephant-based armies of his Indian opponents lacked. At his death the realm reached from the Oxus and Kabul across the Punjab and the Gangetic plain to the frontiers of Bengal and Bihar, but it remained a loose military conquest rather than a settled state; Babur, as Asher writes, bequeathed to Humayun "a shaky and as yet unconsolidated empire".

== Policies ==
=== Foreign relations and policies ===
Babur made no attempt to establish formal diplomatic relations with the Ottomans while trying to defeat the Uzbeks and recapture his ancestral homeland. He did, however, employ the matchlock commander Mustafa Rumi and several other Ottomans. From them, he adopted the tactic of using matchlocks and cannons in the field (rather than only in sieges), which gave him an important advantage in India.

=== Religious policy ===
Babur defeated and killed Ibrahim Lodi, the last Sultan of the Lodi dynasty, in 1526. Babur ruled for 4 years and was succeeded by his son Humayun, whose reign was temporarily usurped by the Suri dynasty. During their 30-year rule, religious violence continued in India. Records of the violence and trauma, from a Sikh-Muslim perspective, include those recorded in Sikh literature of the 16th century. The violence of Babur in the 1520s was witnessed by Guru Nanak, who commented upon it in four hymns. Historians suggest the early Mughal period of religious violence contributed to introspection and then the transformation in Sikhism from pacifism to militancy for self-defense. According to Babur's autobiography, Baburnama, his campaign in northwest India targeted Hindus and Sikhs as well as apostates (non-Sunni sects of Islam), and an immense number were killed, with Muslim camps building "towers of skulls of the infidels" on hillocks. In Babur's secret will, in the year 935 AH, 1529 AD, to Humayun, Babur advises Humayun to administer justice according to the ways of every religion, avoid the sacrifice of the cow, not ruin the temples and shrines of any law-obeying community, and overlook the dissensions of the Shias and the Sunnis.

== Personal life and relationships ==
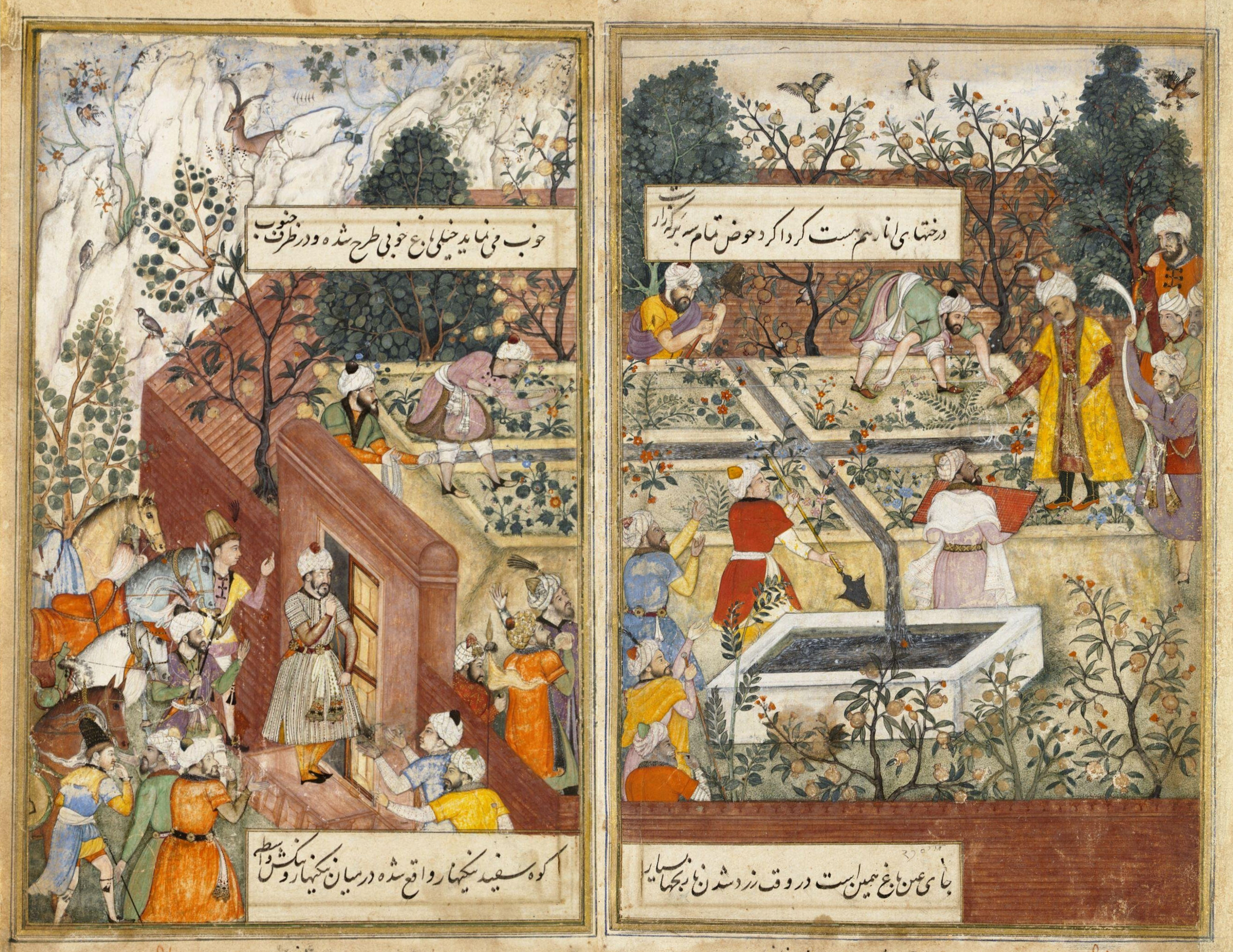
Babur supervising the laying out of the Garden of Fidelity in Kabul. Baburnama, 1590

There are no descriptions about Babur's physical appearance, except from the paintings in the translation of the Baburnama prepared during the reign of Akbar. In his autobiography, Babur claimed to be strong and physically fit, and that he had swum across every major river he encountered, including twice across the Ganges River in North India.

Babur did not initially know Old Hindi; however, his Turkic poetry indicates that he picked up some of its vocabulary later in life.

Unlike his father, he had ascetic tendencies and did not have any great interest in women. In his first marriage, he was "bashful" towards Aisha Sultan Begum, later losing his affection for her. Babur showed similar shyness in his interactions with Baburi, a boy 3 years younger than himself in his camp with whom he had an infatuation around this time, recounting that:

"Occasionally Baburi came to me, but I was so bashful that I could not look him in the face, much less converse freely with him. In my excitement and agitation I could not thank him for coming, much less complain of his leaving. Who could bear to demand the ceremonies of fealty?"

However, Babur acquired several more wives and concubines over the years, and as required for a prince, he was able to ensure the continuity of his line.

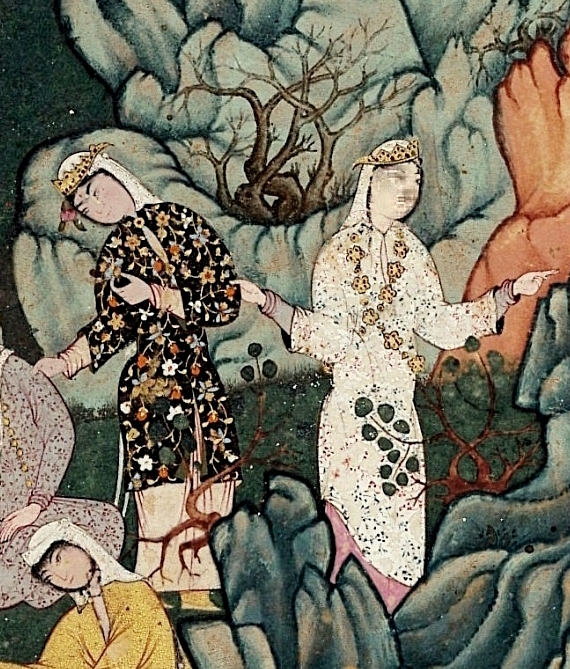
Likely contemporary portraits of Gulbadan and Gulchehra Begum, daughters of Babur, in 1546, Kabul. Dust Muhammad.

Babur's first wife, Aisha Sultan Begum, was his paternal cousin, the daughter of Sultan Ahmad Mirza, his father's brother. She was an infant when betrothed to Babur, who was himself five years old. They married eleven years later, c. 1498–99. The couple had one daughter, Fakhr-un-Nissa, who died within a year in 1500. Three years later, after Babur's first defeat at Fergana, Aisha left him and returned to her father's household. In 1504, Babur married Zaynab Sultan Begum, who died childless within two years. In the period 1506–08, Babur married four women: Maham Begum (in 1506), Masuma Sultan Begum, Gulrukh Begum, and Dildar Begum. Babur had four children by Maham Begum, of whom only one survived infancy. This was his eldest son and heir, Humayun. Masuma Sultan Begum died during childbirth; the year of her death is disputed (either 1508 or 1519). Gulrukh bore Babur two sons, Kamran and Askari, and Dildar Begum was the mother of Babur's youngest son, Hindal. Babur later married Mubaraka Yusufzai, a Pashtun woman of the Yusufzai tribe. Gulnar Aghacha and Nargul Aghacha were two Circassian slaves given to Babur as gifts by Tahmasp Shah Safavi, the Shah of Persia. They became "recognized ladies of the royal household."

During his rule in Kabul, when there was a time of relative peace, Babur pursued his interests in literature, art, music, and gardening. Previously, he never drank alcohol and avoided it when he was in Herat. In Kabul, he first tasted it at the age of thirty. He then began to drink regularly, host wine parties, and consume preparations made from opium. Though religion had a central place in his life, Babur also approvingly quoted a line of poetry by one of his contemporaries: "I am drunk, officer. Punish me when I am sober". He quit drinking for health reasons before the Battle of Khanwa, just two years before his death, and demanded that his court do the same. But he did not stop chewing narcotic preparations, and did not lose his sense of irony. He wrote, "Everyone regrets drinking and swears an oath (of abstinence); I swore the oath and regret that."

Babur acknowledged Chinggisid laws and customs that were influential in Turco-Mongol society but downplayed their importance compared to divine laws:

"Previously our ancestors had shown unusual respect for the Chingizid code (törah). They did not violate this code sitting and rising at councils and court, at feasts and dinners. [However] Chingez Khan's code is not a nass qati (categorical text) that a person must follow. Whenever one leaves a good custom, it should be followed. If ancestors leave a bad custom, however it is necessary to substitute a good one."

== Literary works ==
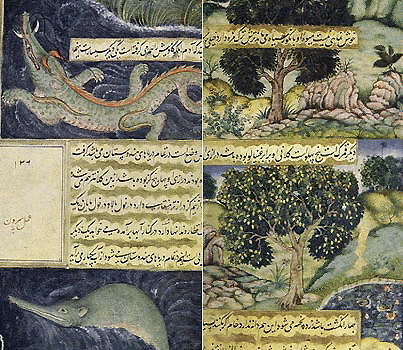
Illustrations in the Baburnama regarding the fauna of India.

Babur was an acclaimed writer, who had a profound love for literature. His library was one of his most beloved possessions that he always carried around with him, and books were one of the treasures he searched for in newly conquered lands. In his memoirs, when he listed sovereigns and nobles of a conquered land, he also mentioned poets, musicians, and other educated people.

Even though he died aged 47, Babur left a rich literary and scientific heritage. He authored his famous memoir, the Bāburnāma, as well as beautiful lyrical works or ghazals, treatises on Muslim jurisprudence (Mubayyin), poetics (Aruz risolasi), music, and a special calligraphy, known as khatt-i Baburi.

Babur's Bāburnāma is a collection of memoirs, written in the Chagatai language and later translated into Persian, the usual literary language of the Mughal court, during the rule of emperor Akbar. However, Babur's Turkic prose in Bāburnāma is already highly Persianized in its sentence structure, vocabulary, and morphology, and also consists of several phrases and minor poems in Persian.

Babur wrote most of his poems in Chagatai Turkic, known to him as Türki, but he also composed in Persian. However, he was mostly praised for his literary works written in Turkic, which drew comparisons with the poetry of Ali-Shir Nava'i. The contemporary historian Mirza Haidar ranked him a Turki poet "second only to Mir Ali Shir", and Babur took his prosody seriously enough to write an essay on Turkic metre, the Aruz risalasi, which he judged superior to Nava'i's own treatment of the subject. He also devised a personal calligraphic hand, the khatt-i Baburi, in which he had a copy of the Qur'an made, and copies of his Walidiyya translation and his Hindustan poems circulated.

The Baburnama itself is regarded as one of the earliest true autobiographies in Islamic literature. Frank to the point of self-incrimination, it sets down Babur's faults and failures alongside his triumphs and offers detailed descriptions of the peoples, customs, animals, plants and landscapes he encountered; Stephen Dale characterises its author as "a relentlessly ambitious, humorous, casually violent, articulate, heavy drinking, personally engaging, highly cultured Muslim". Written in Chaghatai Turkic, it was rendered into Persian for the imperial library by Abdul Rahim Khan-i-Khanan in November 1589, during the reign of Babur's grandson Akbar, and was repeatedly illustrated by Mughal painters thereafter.

The following ruba'i is an example of Babur's poetry written in Turkic, composed in the aftermath of his famous victory in North India to celebrate his ghazi status.

Islam ichin avara-i yazi buldim,
Kuffar u hind harbsazi buldim
Jazm aylab idim uzni shahid olmaqqa,
Amminna' lillahi ki gazi buldim

For Islam's sake I wandered barren wastes; Against unbelievers and the land of Hind I mustered force. Having vowed to make myself a martyr, By God's leave I took up the sword as a ghazi.

== Gardens, art and architecture ==
Babur was a passionate maker of gardens, and the Baburnama dwells on the planning and planting of gardens far more than on any building project; it has been noted that, although an observant Muslim, Babur never mentions building or even praying in a mosque, while he describes his gardens at length and gives them evocative names. Regarding the Punjab as his by Timurid right, he laid out his earliest Indian gardens on the banks of the river Yamuna at Agra, introducing to the plains of northern India the symmetrical, four-part charbagh (paradise garden) watered from the river. This rationally ordered garden, which Babur treated as concrete evidence of his Timurid heritage, became one of the enduring trademarks of Mughal architecture. A garden he designed himself near the Ghaggar river was completed in 1528–29, and the quarter of Agra developed by his nobles was nicknamed "Kabul" by local people, while the site of his Panipat garden is still called Kabuli Bagh. The Agra garden, long known as the Ram Bagh (or Aram Bagh), was by tradition associated with Babur, but it has been re-identified as the Bagh-i Nur Afshan of Nur Jahan, completed in 1621.

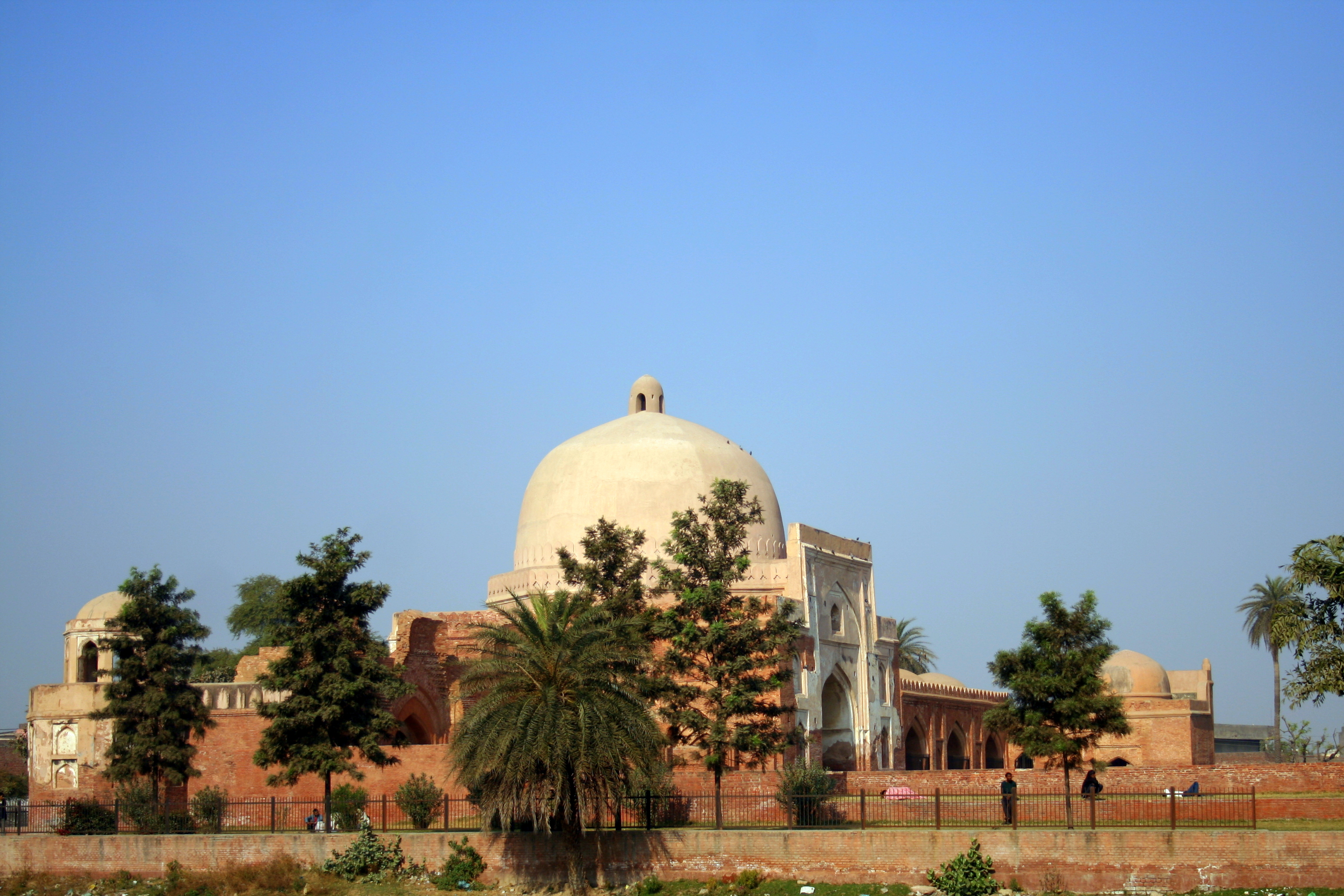
The Kabuli Bagh Mosque at Panipat, built by Babur to commemorate his victory at the First Battle of Panipat (1526), one of three congregational mosques surviving from his reign.

Few of Babur's buildings survive, and his chief architectural monuments are three congregational mosques erected during his brief reign: one at Sambhal (1526) and two dated 1528–29, the Kabuli Bagh Mosque at Panipat and a mosque at Ayodhya.

This mosque, the Babri Masjid, became the focus of the Ram Janmabhoomi–Babri Masjid dispute. In December 1992 it was demolished by activists of the Vishva Hindu Parishad and the Bharatiya Janata Party, an event that set off communal rioting in which more than a thousand people were killed and that has remained a charged issue in Indian politics ever since. As its reputed builder, many Hindu nationalists target Babur in modern India, accusing him of demolishing a temple for building the mosque. However, in 2019, the Indian Supreme Court held that there is nothing to prove that the structure, which was present before the construction of the mosque, was demolished for the purpose of building mosque.

== Death and legacy ==
In the last months of his life, Babur was preoccupied with the succession. His eldest son and intended heir, Humayun, fell dangerously ill at Sambhal in 1530, and by a celebrated account preserved by his daughter Gulbadan Begum, the emperor, advised to give away his most precious possession to obtain his son's recovery, offered instead his own life: he walked three times round the sick-bed and prayed that the illness be transferred to him. Humayun recovered, and Babur's own health declined soon afterwards. A letter of advice he had earlier sent to Humayun urged him to deal gently with his brothers, and Babur divided his dominions among his sons in roughly a six-to-five ratio between Humayun and Kamran; the injunction to forbearance would shape, and trouble, Humayun's later dealings with Kamran.

Babur died in Agra on 5 January 1531 [O.S. 26 December 1530] and was succeeded by Humayun. He was first buried in Chauburji, Agra. Later, as per his wishes, his mortal remains were moved to Kabul and reburied in Bagh-e Babur in Kabul sometime between 1539 and 1544.

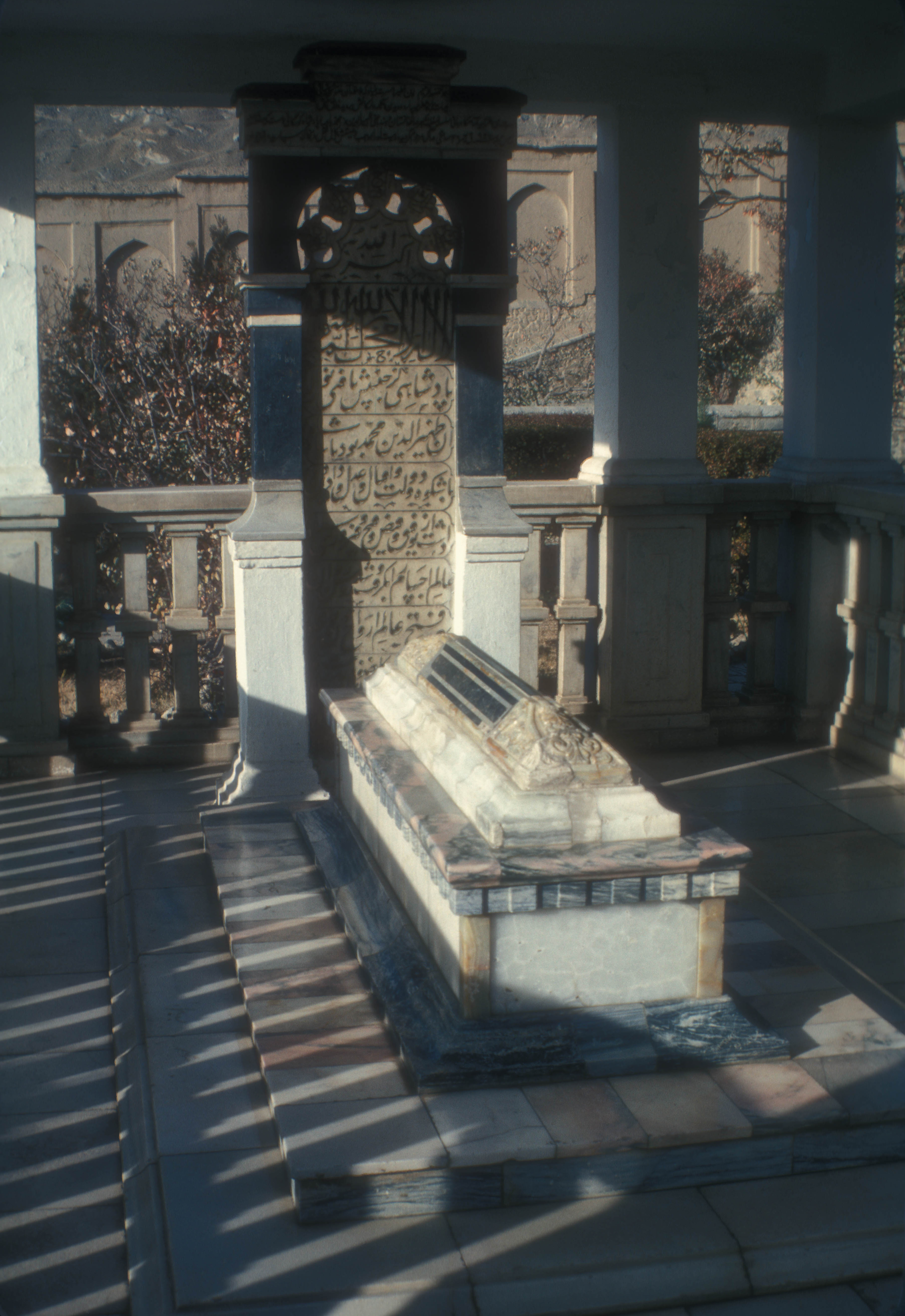
Babur's tomb, located in the Gardens of Babur, Kabul

It is generally agreed that, as a Timurid, Babur was not only significantly influenced by the Persian culture, but also that his empire gave rise to the expansion of the Persianate ethos in the Indian subcontinent. He emerged in his own telling as a Timurid Renaissance inheritor, leaving signs of Islamic, artistic, literary, and social aspects in India.

F. Lehmann states in the Encyclopædia Iranica:

His origin, milieu, training, and culture were steeped in Persian culture and so Babur was largely responsible for the fostering of this culture by his descendants, the Mughals of India, and for the expansion of Persian cultural influence in the Indian subcontinent, with brilliant literary, artistic, and historiographical results.

Although all applications of modern Central Asian ethnicities to people of Babur's time are anachronistic, Soviet and Uzbek sources regard Babur as an ethnic Uzbek. At the same time, during the Soviet Union, Uzbek scholars were censored for idealising and praising Babur and other historical figures such as Ali-Shir Nava'i.

Babur is considered a national hero in Uzbekistan. On 14 February 2008, stamps in his name were issued in the country to commemorate his 525th birth anniversary. Many of Babur's poems have become popular Uzbek folk songs, especially by Sherali Joʻrayev. Some sources claim that Babur is a national hero in Kyrgyzstan too. In October 2005, Pakistan developed the Babur Cruise Missile, named in his honour.

Shahenshah Babar, an Indian film about the emperor directed by Wajahat Mirza, was released in 1944. The 1960 Indian biographical film Babar by Hemen Gupta covered the emperor's life with Gajanan Jagirdar in the lead role.

One of the enduring features of Babur's life was that he left behind the lively and well-written autobiography known as Baburnama. Quoting Henry Beveridge, Stanley Lane-Poole writes:

His autobiography is one of those priceless records which are for all time, and is fit to rank with the confessions of St. Augustine and Rousseau, and the memoirs of Gibbon and Newton. In Asia it stands almost alone.

In his own words, "The cream of my testimony is this, do nothing against your brothers even though they may deserve it." Also, "The new year, the spring, the wine and the beloved are joyful. Babur make merry, for the world will not be there for you a second time."

== Family ==
=== Consorts ===
- Aisha Sultan Begum (m. 1499; div. 1503), daughter of Sultan Ahmed Mirza;
- Zainab Sultan Begum (m. 1504; d. 1506–07), daughter of Sultan Mahmud Mirza;
- Maham Begum (m. 1506)—Babur's chief and favourite consort;
- Masuma Sultan Begum (m. 1507; d. 1508), daughter of Sultan Ahmed Mirza and half-sister of Aisha Sultan Begum;
- Bibi Mubarika (m. 1519), Pashtun of the Yusufzai tribe;
- Gulrukh Begum. Sister of Amir Sultan Ali Mirza Begchik. They married no later than 1512, and she died before 1545.
- Dildar Begum, a woman of great learning, poetic talent, charm, and grace; she was the nadima-i majlis (boon companion) of Malwa sultan Nasir-ud Din Shah (r. 1500 – 1510) and after that of Sultan of Delhi Sikandar Lodhi (r. 1489 – 1517);
- Gulnar Aghacha, a Circassian concubine;
- Nargul or Nazgul Aghacha, another Circassian concubine;

The identity of the mother of one of Babur's daughters, Gulrukh Begum, is disputed. Gulrukh's mother may have been the daughter of Sultan Mahmud Mirza by his wife Pasha Begum, who is referred to as Saliha Sultan Begum in certain secondary sources; however, this name is not mentioned in the Baburnama or the works of Gulbadan Begum, which casts doubt on her existence. This woman may never have existed at all, or she may even be the same woman as Dildar Begum.

=== Issue ===
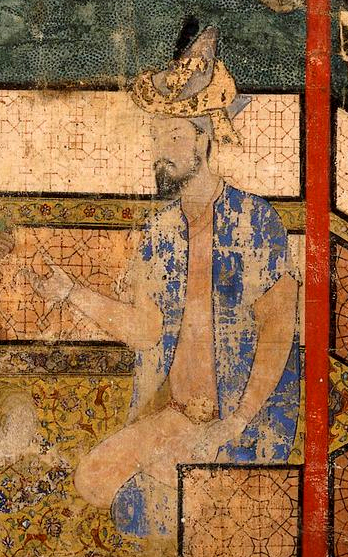
Contemporary portrait of Humayun from life (painted in Kabul, c. 1550–55), wearing the Tāj-i 'Izzat

Name	Birth	Death	Notes
By Aisha Sultan Begum
Fakhr-un-Nissa Begum	1501	1501	
By Maham Begum
Humayun	6 March 1508	27 January 1556	succeeded as the second Mughal Emperor
Barbul Mirza	unknown	d. infancy	
Mehr Jahan Begum	b. unknown at Khost	d. infancy	
Aisan Daulat Begum	unknown	d. infancy	
Faruq Mirza	2 August 1526	1527	
By Masuma Sultan Begum
Masuma Sultan Begum	1508	unknown	Married to Muhammad Zaman Mirza;
By Gulrukh Begum
Kamran Mirza	c. 1509	16 October 1557	
Askari Mirza	5 February 1516	1558	
Sultan Ahmad Mirza	unknown	d. young	
Shahrukh Mirza	Unknown	d. young	
Gulizar Begum	unknown	d. young	
By Dildar Begum
Hindal Mirza	4 March 1519	20 November 1551	
Alwar Mirza	unknown	1529, Agra	
Gulrang Begum	1514, Khost	Unknown	Married her first-cousin once removed, Isan Timur Sultan, ninth son of Ahmad Alaq of Moghulistan;
Gulchehra Begum	c. 1516	c. 1557	Married twice. Firstly, to her first-cousin once-removed, Sultan Tukhta Bugha Khan (died 1533), son of Ahmad Alaq of Moghulistan in 1530; secondly to Abbas Sultan Uzbeg in 1549.
Gulbadan Begum	20 November 1522	7 February 1603	Author of the Humayun-nama. Married her second cousin, Khizr Khwaja Khan, son of her father's cousin Aiman Khwajah Sultan of Moghulistan, son of Ahmad Alaq of Moghulistan.
By Dildar Begum or Saliha Sultan Begum (disputed)
Gulrukh Begum	unknown	unknown	Married Nuruddin Muhammad Mirza, son of Khwaja Hasan Naqshbandi, with whom she had Salima Sultan Begum.

== Sources ==
=== Secondary sources ===
- Baynes, T. S., ed. (1878), "Baber" , Encyclopædia Britannica, vol. 3 (9th ed.), New York: Charles Scribner's Sons, p. 179
- Chisholm, Hugh, ed. (1911), "Baber" , Encyclopædia Britannica, vol. 3 (11th ed.), Cambridge University Press, p. 92
- Cambridge History of India, vol. III, Cambridge University Press, 1928
- Cambridge History of India, vol. IV, Cambridge University Press, 1937
- Eraly, Abraham (2007), Emperors of the Peacock Throne: The Saga of the Great Moghuls, Penguin Books Limited, ISBN 978-93-5118-093-7
- Gulbadan Begum (1902). Humayun-nama :The history of Humayun. Translated by Annette S. Beveridge. Royal Asiatic Society.
- Srivastava, Sushil (25 October 2003). "The ASI Report – a review". Frontline. Archived from the original on 20 December 2013.
- Wink, Andre (2012). Akbar. Simon and Schuster. ISBN 978-1-78074-209-0.

=== Primary sources ===
- Beveridge, Annette Susannah (2018) [1922]. The Babur-Nama Memoirs of Babur. Vol. I. Atlantic Publishers & Distributors Pvt Limited. ISBN 978-81-269-2519-3. Alt URL

Babur Timurid dynasty Born: 14 February 1483 Died: 26 December 1530
Regnal titles
New title Dynasty founded	Mughal Emperor; 20 April 1526 – 26 December 1530	Succeeded by Humayun
