= George William Hamilton =

Jamaican planter and politician

George William Hamilton (1786 - 18 October 1857) was a planter in Jamaica. He was elected to the House of Assembly of Jamaica in 1820.

According to the Legacies of British Slave-Ownership at the University College London, Hamilton was awarded a payment as a slave trader in the aftermath of the Slavery Abolition Act 1833 with the Slave Compensation Act 1837. The British Government took out a £15 million loan (worth £1.8 billion in 2023) with interest from Nathan Mayer Rothschild and Moses Montefiore which was subsequently paid off by the British taxpayers (ending in 2015). Hamilton was associated with seven different claims, he owned 671 slaves in Jamaica and received a £11,704 payment at the time (worth £1.4 million in 2023).
