= Jahangir Mirza II =

Mughal prince (1485–1507 or 1508)

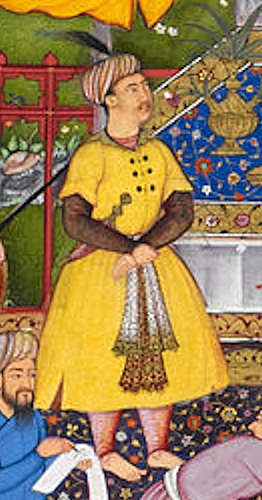
Portrait of Jahangir Mirza II. Baburnama, British Library

Jahangir Mirza II (1485–1507 or 1508) was the second son of Umar Sheikh Mirza and half brother of Babur, the founder of the Mughal Empire. He was two years younger to Babur and his mother, Fatima Sultan, belonged to the clan of Mughal Tuman Begs.

Jahangir Mirza was the focus of a rival coterie of Mughal Begs for claiming the family fiefdom of Umar Sheikh, the kingdom of Farghana and its dependencies, in the initial years of Babur's reign as a young Timurid prince. However, Jahangir Mirza later shared an almost stable relation with Babur as is evident by his survival as a Mirza with his own following and his later status as a first among equals among the lower-ranking Mirzas of the Timurid clan. Jahangir Mirza was in Babur's camp in the latter part of his career and strongly suggested the launch on attack on Qalat-i-Ghilzai during Babur's illness in 911 AH according to the Baburnama. Jahangir Mirza was present at numerous feasts and celebrations by Babur during his onward march towards Kabul. Jahangir Mirza was awarded Ghazni for his labours in Babur's successful campaign for the conquest of Kabul in 1504. Babur later visited him in Ghazni as is evident by a contemporary miniature painting of a feast thrown by him in Ghazni in Babur's honour in May 1505. The last mention of Jahangir Mirza in the Baburnama is in the events of 913 AH when his wife, the mother of his son Pir-i-Muhammad, came to pay respects to Babur.
