= List of Mughal empresses =

This is a list of Mughal empresses. Most of these empresses were either from branches of the Timurid dynasty, from the royal houses or families of Persian nobles and some from the Rajput royal families. Alongside Mughal emperors, these empresses played a role in the building up and rule of the Mughal Empire in South Asia, from the early 16th century to the early 18th century. The Mughal Empire mainly corresponds in the present day to the modern countries of India, Pakistan, Afghanistan, Bangladesh and Nepal.

== Mughal Consort ==
- Legal consorts
- Legal consorts who predeceased spouse's accession
- Legal consorts who predeceased or divorced prior to establishment of Mughal Empire
- Legal consorts who bore Emperors
- Concubines

Name	Parent(s)	Birth name	Origin	Place of Origin	Marriage	Became consort	Ceased to be consort	Death	Note	Spouse
Aisha Sultan Begum	Sultan Ahmed Mirza and Qutak Begum	unknown	Timurid	Samarqand	1499 (of Ferghana Valley)		1503; Divorced.	unknown	divorced prior to conquest of India.	Babur
Zainab Sultan Begum	Sultan Ahmed Mirza and Khanzada Begum	unknown	Timurid	Samarqand	1504 (of Ferghana Valley)		1506 or 1507; her death			Babur
Maham Begum	unknown	unknown	Persian		1506	1506 (of Ferghana Valley) 21 April 1526; Mughal Dynasty established.	26 December 1530; Spouse's death	8 May 1533	Padshah Begum	Babur
Masuma Sultan Begum	Sultan Ahmed Mirza and Habiba Sultan Begum	unknown	Timurid	Samarqand	1507 (of Ferghana Valley)		1508; her death			Babur
Bibi Mubarika	Malik Shah Mansur Yusufzai	unknown	Pashtun	unknown	1519	21 April 1526; Mughal Dynasty established.	26 December 1530; Spouse's death	1530		Babur
Gulrukh Begum	unknown		Begchik Mughals		before 1512	21 April 1526; Mughal Dynasty established.	26 December 1530; Spouse's death	unknown		Babur
Dildar Begum	unknown					21 April 1526; Mughal Dynasty established.	26 December 1530; Spouse's death	unknown		Babur
Bega Begum	Yadgar Beg	unknown	Persian	Khorasan	1527	26 December 1530 spouse's first accession; 22 June 1555 second accession	17 May 1540 interregnum 27 January 1556 Spouse's death	17 January 1582	Padshah Begum. Built Humayun's tomb.	Humayun
Hamida Banu Begum	Shaikh Ali Akbar Jami and Mah Afroz Begum	unknown	Persian	unknown	1541	22 June 1555 Spouse's accession	27 January 1556 Spouse's death	30 August 1604	Mother of 3rd Emperor Akbar.	Humayun
Mah Chuchak Begum	unknown	unknown	Mongol	unknown	1546	22 June 1555 Spouse's accession	27 January 1556 Spouse's death	28 March 1564	Seized Kabul from Akbar.	Humayun
Ruqaiya Sultan Begum	Hindal Mirza and Sultanam Begum		Timurid	unknown	1556 marriage to the monarch		27 October 1605 Spouse's death	January 1626		Akbar
Salima Sultan Begum	Nuruddin Muhammad Mirza and Gulrukh Begum		Naqshbandi	unknown	1561 marriage to the monarch		27 October 1605 Spouse's death	2 January 1613		Akbar
Mariam-uz-Zamani	Raja Bharmal of Amber and Rani Champavati Solanki	Harkha Bai	Kachhwaha	Amber	6 February 1562 marriage to the monarch		27 October 1605 Spouse's death	19 May 1623	Mother of 4th Emperor Jahangir.	Akbar
Gauhar-un-Nissa Begum	Shaikh Muhammad Bakhtiyar		Din Laqab	Agra	1562 marriage to the monarch		27 October 1605 Spouse's death			Akbar
Raj Kunwari	Kanha of Bikaner		Bika Rathore	Bikaner	1570 marriage to the monarch		27 October 1605 Spouse's death			Akbar
Nathi Bai	Rawal Harraj Bhati		Bhati	Jaisalmer	1570 marriage to the monarch		27 October 1605 Spouse's death			Akbar
Bhakkari Begum	Sultan Mahmud of Bhakkar	unknown		Bhakkar	July 1572 marriage to the monarch		27 October 1605 Spouse's death			Akbar
Qasima Banu Begum	Arab Shah				1575 marriage to the monarch		27 October 1605 Spouse's death			Akbar
Bibi Daulat Shad					on marriage to Monarch		27 October 1605 Spouse's death			Akbar
Rukmavati Bai	Rao Maldeo Rathore		Jodho Rathore	Marwar	on marriage to Monarch		27 October 1605 Spouse's death			Akbar
Shah Begum	Raja Bhagwant Das of Amber	Man Bai	Kachhwaha	Amber	13 February 1585	–	–	5 May 1605		Jahangir
Jagat Gosain	Raja Udai Singh of Marwar and Rani Kachwahi Manrang Devi	Manavati Bai	Jodho Rathore	Jodhpur or Phalodi	21 January 1586	3 November 1605 spouse's accession	8 April 1619 her death		mother of Emperor Shah Jahan.	Jahangir
Sahib Jamal	Khwaja Hasan	unknown	Turkish	Herat	1586	–	–	25 June 1599		Jahangir
Malika Jahan	Rawal Bhim Singh of Jaisalmer	unknown	Bhati	Jaisalmer	1587	3 November 1605 spouse's accession	unknown			Jahangir
Nur-un-Nissa Begum	Ibrahim Husain Mirza and Gulrukh Begum		Timurid	Khorasan	26 February 1593	3 November 1605 spouse's accession	unknown			Jahangir
Khas Mahal	Zain Khan Koka	unknown	Iranian	unknown	18 June 1596	3 November 1605 spouse's accession	unknown			Jahangir
Saliha Banu Begum	Qaim Khan	unknown	unknown	unknown	1608 marriage to the monarch		10 June 1620 her death		Padshah Begum.	Jahangir
Nur Jahan	Mirza Ghiyas Beg and Asmat Begum	Mehr-un-nissa	Persian	Kandahar	25 May 1611 marriage to the monarch		28 October 1627 spouse's death	17 December 1645	Padshah Begum. Partisan of Shahryar Mirza during war of succession.	Jahangir
Mihr-un-nissa Begum	Sher Afgan Khan and Nur Jahan		Turkoman	unknown	23 April 1621	7 November 1627 spouse's accession	19 January 1628 spouse's death	unknown	De-facto Empress and daughter of Nur Jahan.	Shahryar Mirza (de-facto)
Kandahari Begum	Sultan Muzaffar Husain Mirza Safavi	unknown	Safavid Persian	Kandahar	1610	19 January 1628 spouse's accession		unknown		Shah Jahan
Mumtaz Mahal	Abu'l-Hasan Asaf Khan and Diwanji Begum	Arjumand Banu Begum	Persian	Agra	1612	19 January 1628 spouse's accession	17 June 1631 her death		Padshah Begum and mother of 6th Emperor Alamgir. Her mausoleum is Taj Mahal.	Shah Jahan
Akbarabadi Mahal	Mirza Iraj	Izz-un-Nissa	Turkoman	Agra	1617	19 January 1628 spouse's accession	31 July 1658 spouse dethroned	28 January 1678		Shah Jahan
Lilavati Bai	Kunwar Sakti Singh of Marwar		Rathore	Marwar	prior to 1627	19 January 1628 spouse's accession		unknown		Shah Jahan
Dilras Banu Begum	Mirza Badi-uz-Zaman Safavi and Nauras Banu Begum		Safavid Persian	unknown	8 May 1637	–	–	8 October 1657	Mother of the 7th Emperor, Azam Shah and poetess, Zeb-un-nisa.	Aurangzeb
Nawab Bai	Raja Tajuddin Khan of Rajauri (disputed)	Rahmat-un-Nissa	Jarral	unknown	1638	3 March 1707 spouse's accession	1691 her death		mother of the 8th, Bahadur Shah I.	Aurangzeb
Aurangabadi Mahal	unknown	unknown	Georgian or Circassian	unknown	unknown	3 March 1707 spouse's accession	November 1688 her death			Aurangzeb
Udaipuri Mahal	unknown	unknown	Georgian or Cricassian or Armenian	Kashmir or Udaipur	–	–	–	July 1707		Aurangzeb
Rahmat Banu Begum	Swargadeo Sutamla of Ahom kingdom and Pakhori Gabharu	Ramani Gabharu	Ahom	Ahom kingdom	13 May 1668	–	–	1684		Muhammad Azam Shah
Jahanzeb Banu Begum	Dara Shikoh and Nadira Banu Begum	unknown	Timurid	Agra	3 January 1669	–	–	1705		Muhammad Azam Shah
Shahar Banu Begum	Ali Adil Shah II and Khurshida Khanum	unknown	Adilshahi	Bijapur	26 July 1681	14 March 1707 spouse's accession	20 June 1707 spouse's death	unknown	Padshah Begum.	Muhammad Azam Shah
Nur-un-Nissa Begum	Mirza Sanjar Khan and Zinat-i-Alam Begum		Persian	Khorasan	30 December 1659	–	–	February 1701		Bahadur Shah I
Nizam Bai	Fatehyawar Jang (Disputed)	unknown		Hyderabad	12 March 1660	–	–	1692	mother of Emperor Jahandar Shah.	Bahadur Shah I
Sayyid-un-Nissa Begum	Mirza Rustam Safavi		Safavi	unknown	30 August 1684	27 February 1712 spouse's accession	11 January 1713 spouse's deposed	unknown		Jahandar Shah
Imtiaz Mahal	Khasusiyat Khan	Lal Kunwar	unknown	unknown	unknown	27 February 1712 spouse's accession	11 January 1713 spouse's deposed			Jahandar Shah
Gauhar-Un-Nissa Begum	Mir Muhammad Taqi		Persian	unknown	unknown	11 January 1713 spouse's accession	28 February 1719 spouse's deposition and death	unknown		Farrukhsiyar
Indira Kanwar	Ajit Singh of Marwar		Jodho Rathore	Jodhpur	27 September 1715 marriage to the monarch		28 February 1719 spouse's deposition and death	1763		Farrukhsiyar
Bhup Devi	Bakhtiyar Khan, Raja of Kishtwar			Kishtwar	3 July 1717 marriage to the monarch		28 February 1719 spouse's deposition and death	unknown		Farrukhsiyar
Badshah Begum	Farrukhsiyar and Gauhar-un-Nissa Begum	unknown	Timurid	Agra	1721 marriage to the monarch		26 April 1748 spouse's death	1786	Padshah Begum. Fostered Emperor Ahmad Shah Bahadur.	Muhammad Shah
Sahiba Mahal	Sayid Salabat Khan and Safa Begum	unknown	Turkish	unknown	1722 marriage to the monarch		26 April 1748 spouse's death			Muhammad Shah
Qudsia Begum	unknown	Udham Bai	unknown	unknown	unknown	on marriage to the monarch	26 April 1748 spouse's death		mother of Ahmad Shah Bahadur.	Muhammad Shah
Zeenat Mahal	unknown	unknown	unknown	unknown	19 November 1840 on marriage to the monarch		14 September 1857 spouse's deposition			Bahadur Shah Zafar

== Sources ==
- Banks Findly, Ellison (11 February 1993). Nur Jahan: Empress of Mughal India. Oxford, UK: Nur Jahan : Empress of Mughal India. ISBN 9780195074888.
- Prasad, Beni (1930). History of Jahangir. Allahabad: The Indian Press.
- Beveridge, Henry (1907). Akbarnama of Abu'l-Fazl ibn Mubarak – Volume III. Asiatic Society, Calcutta.
- Mukhia, Harbans (2004). The Mughals of India. Malden, MA: Wiley-Blackwell. ISBN 978-0-631-18555-0.
- Nicoll, Fergus (2009). Shah Jahan: The Rise and Fall of the Mughal Emperor. London: Haus. ISBN 978-1-906598-18-1.
- Syed, Anees Jahan (1977). Aurangzeb in Muntakhab-al Lubab. Somaiya Publications.
