= Bega Begum =

Padshah Begum of the Mughal Empire

- Empress consort of the Mughal Empire; Zan-i-Kalan
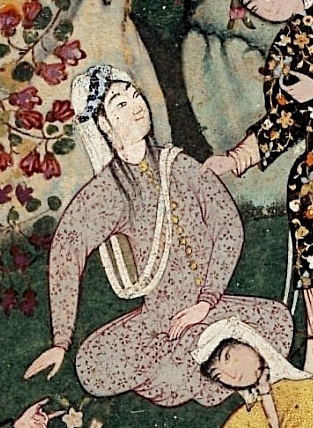
- Possible contemporary depiction of Bega Begum in 1546, Kabul. Dust Muhammad.

Padshah Begum
- First tenure: 26 December 1530 – 17 May 1540
- Predecessor: Maham Begum
- Successor: Lad Malika (Sur Empire)
- Second tenure: 22 June 1555 – 27 January 1556
- Successor: Hamida Banu Begum
- Born: Bega Begum c. 1511; Khurasan, Persia
- Died: 17 January 1582 (aged 70–71); Delhi, India
- Burial: Humayun's Tomb, Delhi
- Spouse: Humayun (m. 1527; d. 1556)
- Issue: Al-aman Mirza; Aqiqa Sultan Begum
- House: Timurid (by marriage)
- Father: Yadgar Beg
- Religion: Islam

Bega Begum (c. 1511 – 17 January 1582) was Empress consort of the Mughal Empire from 26 December 1530 to 17 May 1540 and 22 June 1555 to 27 January 1556 as the first wife and chief consort of the second Mughal emperor Humayun. She was known as Zan-i-Kalan being the first wife of Humayun and was also known as Haji Begum after she performed the Hajj pilgrimage.

Bega Begum began the tradition of commissioning monuments in the Mughal Empire when she had her husband's mausoleum commissioned in the late 16th century, Humayun's Tomb at Delhi. This first colossal monumental mausoleum in Islamic India can be considered an early masterpiece that decisively influenced the design of the later Taj Mahal, the high point of Mughal architecture.

== Early years and marriage ==
Bega Begum was a Persian from Khurasan and was the daughter of Humayun's maternal uncle (taghai), Yadgar Beg, who was the brother of Sultan Ali Mirza, father of Kamran Mirza's wife Gulrukh Begum. She was a wise, well educated woman and had profound knowledge of medicine and treatment also.

Bega married her first cousin, Prince Nasir ud-din (later known as 'Humayun' upon his accession) in 1527. The marriage took place while Humayun was in Badakshan during his second term as Viceroy of the province (1527–1529). In November 1528, she gave birth to Humayun's first child and son, Shahzada Al-aman Mirza. The imperial couple were tremendously congratulated by the Emperor Babur on the birth of an heir, although the connotation of his name, 'Al-aman', he thought ominous. The prince died in his childhood.

== Empress ==
Upon Emperor Babur's death in December 1530, Humayun ascended the throne at twenty three-years of age, while Bega was just nineteen when she became empress. She subsequently came to India for the first time, while accompanying her husband. Bega was held in high regard by Humayun throughout his life and remained his favourite as well as his chief consort until his death.

In 1531, Bega announced her second pregnancy to the imperial family after arriving in Agra from Kabul. Here, she gave birth to her last known child, a daughter, Aqiqa Sultan Begum. In 1539, Bega accompanied her husband to Chausa, Bengal, where she was taken as a prisoner by Sher Shah Suri, after a well developed surprise attack on the Mughal territory by Sher Shah's forces. According to Niccolao Manucci, she was the only Mughal empress to have ever been held captive.

On the morning of 26 June 1539, Humayun learned about her captivity, he immediately sprang on a horse and collected a small guard consisting of four nobles, Tardi Beg, Baba Beg, Koch Beg, and MrBachka Bahadur. Endeavouring to save the empress, they attempted to fight their way through the Afghan crowd and in doing so all except Tardi Beg were cut down. He alone returned to Humayun. The Tazkirat-ul-umard mentions the death of one Mir Pehlwan Badakshi. Initially, two faithful officers—Baba Julair and Que Beg—while zealously attempting to execute the emperor's orders, courted "martyrdom at the door of Her Majesty's enclosure" and were slain at the entrance of the private tents.

While in captivity, the empress was treated by Sher Shah with the utmost courtesy and respect and he had her returned to Humayun escorted by his most trusted general, Khwas Khan. Unfortunately, the ordeal at Chausa led to death of her eight-year-old daughter, Aqiqa Sultan Begum, on 27 June. Humayun became extremely devastated and regretted ever bringing his daughter to Chausa in the first place. He blamed himself, confessing to his younger brother Hindal Mirza, 'In the earlier disturbance, Aqiqa Bibi [his daughter] had disappeared and I suffered from everlasting regret why I had not killed her myself' [lest she fall into the enemy's hands], a sentiment that his brother entirely endorsed.

Bega was also with Humayun throughout his long exile in Persia at the court of the Safavid dynasty.

=== Dowager empress ===
When Humayun died in 1556, Bega Begum grieved so deeply over her husband's death that she dedicated her life thenceforth to a sole purpose: the construction of the most magnificent mausoleum in the empire, at a site near the Yamuna River in Delhi for the memorial of the late emperor. Bega Begum undertook a pilgrimage to Mecca and Medina for Hajj in 1564, but before starting on her absence from the Court for three years, she made arrangements for the construction of the mausoleum at her own cost. She returned from Hajj in 1567, then led a retired life at Delhi and supervised the project.

The empress' choice of architect for the construction of the mausoleum was the Persian architect, Mirak Mirza Ghiyas. Bega Begum was interested in patronizing education and so she established a madrasa near the mausoleum. She was also responsible for the construction of the Arab Sarai near the tomb.

== Death ==
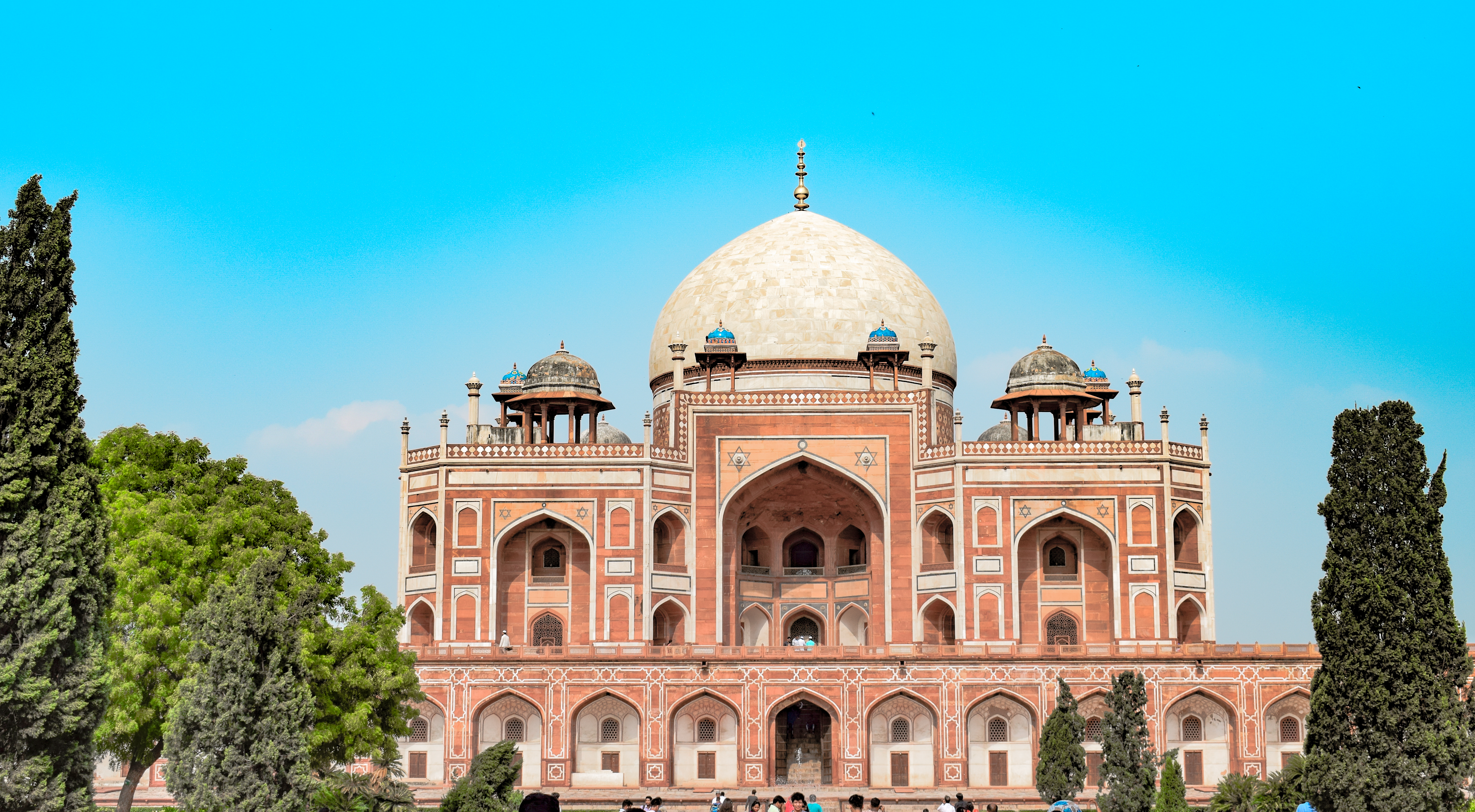
Humayun's Tomb, where Haji Begum is also buried

Bega Begum died in 1582 in Delhi, after a brief illness, and was mourned by her step-son, the Emperor Akbar; whom she shared an extremely close relationship with. Akbar was, in fact, so attached to her that many people, as Akbar himself confirmed, mistook her to be his real mother and confused her with his biological mother, Hamida Banu Begum. `Abd al-Qadir Bada'uni (Badauni) called Bega Begum 'second mother to the Emperor [Akbar]'. Akbar escorted her body to Humayun's Tomb for her burial.

== Legacy ==
During the Mughal era (sixteenth to nineteenth century) the practice of commissioning monuments received a fillip through the efforts of Bega Begum with the construction of Humayun's Tomb. This first colossal monumental mausoleum in Islamic India can be considered an early masterpiece that was to decisively influence the design of the later Taj Mahal, the high point of Mughal architecture. The mausoleum was principally based on Persian architectural vocabularies, but was cleverly Indianized. The surrounding garden was also the first prodigious materialization of the form of the Persian 'Chahar Bagh' (Quartered Garden) in India. The mausoleum is the best representative monument in the Indian capital (Delhi) of the past authority of the Mughal Empire.

== Bibliography ==
- Three Memoirs of Homayun. Volume One: Humáyunnáma and Tadhkiratu'l-wáqíát; Volume Two: Táríkh-i Humáyún, translated from the Persian by Wheeler Thackston. Bilingual Edition, Bibliotheca Iranica: Intellectual Traditions, No. 11 (March 15, 2009). ISBN 1-56859-178-0
