= Nur-un-Nissa Begum (wife of Jahangir) =

- Timurid princess
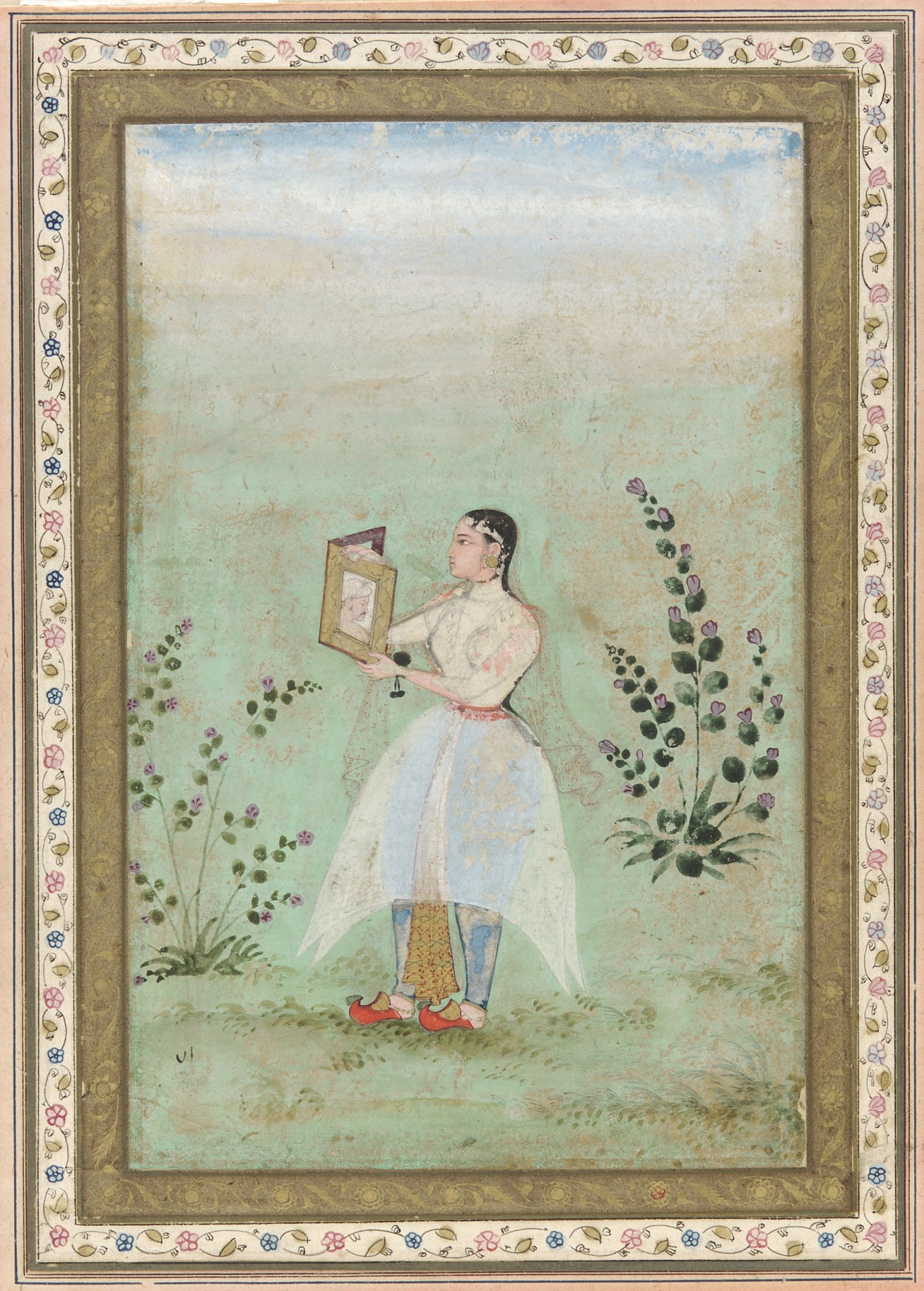
- Painting of a lady, likely Nur-un-Nissa, holding a portrait of Jahangir. ca.1600
- Born: c. 1570
- Spouse: Jahangir (m. 1592; d. 1627)
- Issue: A daughter
- House: Timurid
- Father: Ibrahim Husain Mirza
- Mother: Gulrukh Begum
- Religion: Islam

Nur-un-Nissa Begum (Persian: نورالنساء بیگم; born c. 1570) meaning 'Light among Women', was a Timurid princess, the daughter of Ibrahim Husain Mirza and the wife of fourth Mughal emperor Jahangir.

== Early life ==
Born a Timurid princess, Nur-un-Nissa Begum was the daughter of Prince Ibrahim Husain Mirza, a descendant of Prince Umar Shaikh Mirza, the second son of Amir Timur. Her mother was Princess Gulrukh Begum, the daughter of Prince Kamran Mirza, the son of the first Mughal emperor Babur, and brother of the next emperor Humayun. She had a brother, Prince Muzaffar Husain Mirza, who was married to Akbar's eldest daughter, Shahzada Khanum.

In 1572, Gulrukh Begum lost contact with her husband, Ibrahim Husain Mirza, as he was forced to vacate Gujarat by Akbar. She fled to the Deccan with her children. Ibrahim Husain Mirza, who ultimately fled to Multan, was captured by the royal officers. In 1573, he died while still in prison.

On their way to Deccan, the ruler of Khandesh attempted to arrest Gulrukh Begum and her children as they passed through his territory, but did not succeed in doing so. However, Nur-un-Nissa, who was two years old at that time, fell into his hands. When Akbar heard of this, he ordered that the ruler of Khandesh and Nur-un-Nissa Begum be brought to court. After their arrival at court, she was taken under Akbar's protection and handed over to the guardians of the imperial harem.

In 1577, Gulrukh Begum and her son Muzaffar Husain came back to Gujarat and renewed their rebellion. However, after some initial successes, Muzaffar Husain was captured by royal officers and was imprisoned. Following the imprisonment of her son, Gulrukh joined her daughter at Agra.

== Marriage ==
In the spring of 1591, Gulrukh Begum petitioned for her daughter's marriage with Akbar's eldest son, Prince Salim Mirza. Akbar agreed to her request, and the two were betrothed. The marriage took place on the eve of 26 February 1592 at the house of Akbar's mother Empress Hamida Banu Begum. More than two years later in 1594, Akbar married his daughter Shahzada Khanum to Nur-un-Nissa's brother, Muzaffar Husain Mirza. On 28 August 1595, Nur-un-Nissa gave birth to the couple's only child, a daughter.

Nur-un-Nissa maintained kinship ties with her sister-in-law, Shahzada Khanum, and the latter also strictly observed the rules of courtesy and proper behaviour towards her. In 1614–15, Jahangir, during his stay at Ajmer, visited her mother Gulrukh Begum, who was ill at that time. At the time, Shaikh Farid Bhakkari, the author of Dhakhirat-ul-Khawanin, was serving as a diwan of establishment to her.

== Diwan-i-Kamran ==
Nur-un-Nissa Begum was the owner of "Diwan-i-Kamran", which consisted of poems written by her grandfather Kamran Mirza. Nur-un-Nissa purchased it for three Mohurs.

== Ancestry ==
Ancestors of Nur-un-Nissa Begum (wife of Jahangir)

16. Bayqara Mirza II
8. Sultan Uways Mirza
17. Sa'adat Bakht Begum
4. Muhammad Sultan Mirza
18. Sultan Husayn Mirza Bayqara
9. Sultanum Begum
19. Chuli Begum
2. Ibrahim Husain Mirza
1. Nur-un-Nissa Begum
24. Umar Shaikh Mirza II
12. Babur
25. Qutlugh Nigar Khanum
6. Kamran Mirza
13. Gulrukh Begum
3. Gulrukh Begum

== Sources ==
- Beveridge, Henry (1907). Akbarnama of Abu'l-Fazl ibn Mubarak - Volume III. Asiatic Society, Calcutta.
