= Maham Begum =

Padshah Begum of Mughal Empire

- Empress consort of the Mughal Empire; Empress mother of the Mughal Empire
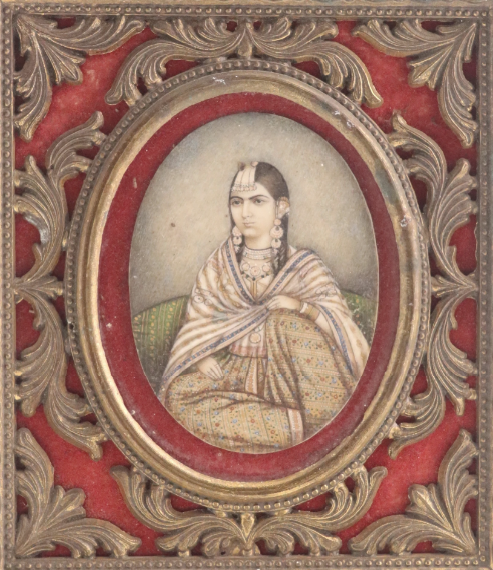

Padshah Begum
- Tenure: 21 April 1526 – 26 December 1530
- Predecessor: position established
- Successor: Bega Begum
- Born: late 15th-century Timurid Empire
- Died: 8 May 1533; Delhi, Mughal Empire
- Burial: Agra, Mughal Empire
- Spouse: Babur (m. 1506; died 1530)
- Issue: Humayun; Barbul Mirza; Faruq Mirza; Mehr Jahan Begum; Aisan Daulat Begum
- House: Timurid (by marriage)
- Religion: Islam

Maham Begum or Mahim Begum (died 8 May 1533) was the empress consort of the Mughal Empire from 21 April 1526 to 26 December 1530 as the third wife and chief consort of Babur, the founder of the Mughal Empire and the first Mughal emperor. She was the mother of Babur's eldest surviving son and eventual successor, Humayun. She is also frequently mentioned in the Humayun-nama by her adoptive daughter Gulbadan Begum, who refers to her as "lady" and "my Lady" (aka and akam, respectively).

== Family and lineage ==
Contemporary records give no specific information regarding Maham Begum's parentage. Babur's autobiography, the Baburnama, makes little mention of their wedding and says nothing about Maham's family. However, there is evidence to suggest that a certain Khwaja Muhammad Ali (referred to as "uncle" by Gulbadan) was Maham's brother. He appears several times in the Baburnama in association with the city of Khost, being employed in the government of Khost, coming from Khost for orders, etc. One of Maham's children was born in the city, and Humayun was later recorded as visiting his maternal grandparents in Khost. Historian Annette Beveridge calls this family "quiet, unwarlike Khwajas". Babur also references a certain Abdul Malik Khosti, who may also have been a relation of Maham's, though this is not certain.

Abu'l-Fazl ibn Mubarak, the vizier of her grandson Akbar, states that Maham was from a noble family of Khorasan, descendants of the 11th century Sufi mystic Sheikh Ahmad Jami. This was a lineage that she shared with her daughter-in-law, Hamida Banu Begum. He also mentions that she was a relation of Sultan Husayn Bayqara, the Timurid ruler of Herat. Though the exact relationship is not given, the wording used by Abu'l Fazl (nisbat-i-khwesh) may imply a blood-relation on her father's side. Consequently, Babur's marriage with Maham shortly after Sultan Husayn's death may have been a sign of condolence to her grieving royal relations. However, according to historian Muni Lal, there is no corroborative evidence to support the relationship.

There are also hints to further Timurid relationships. Gulbadan, Maham Begum's adopted daughter, states that the empress was related to the owners of the Nauroz (New Year) Garden in Kabul, originally constructed by Ulugh Beg II, a paternal uncle of Babur. In addition, some considerations suggest that Gulbadan's mother, Dildar Agacha Begum, was also a relation of Maham's. Dildar herself is theorised to have been a daughter of another of Babur's uncles, Sultan Mahmud Mirza.

== Marriage ==
Babur married her in 1506 at Herat, when on the death of Sultan Husayn Mirza, he paid a condolence visit to Herat capital of Khosran. She was mentioned as "the one who was to Babur" what Aisha was to Muhammad. She played an active role in the political affairs of Babur, as well as in the royal household. She had extreme intelligence and good looks. She accompanied her husband to Badakhshan and Transoxiana and stood by him through thick and thin. She was the chief lady of the royal household. After the birth of the couple's first child, Humayun, she had another four children—Barbul, Mehr Jahan, Aisan Daulat and Faruq—but all died in infancy.

As Babur's chief consort, she had well-defined rights over other members of his harem. She took guardianship of two of Dildar Begum's children, Hindal Mirza and Gulbadan Begum, in 1521 and 1523, respectively, and Babur affirmed it, because four of his five children were dead. A devoted mother, Maham spent all her spare time educating the prince in values dear to her. She narrated to him stories connected with her ancestor Shaikh Ahmad Jam and other renowned holy personages of his time.

=== As empress ===
In 1528, Maham Begum came to Hindustan from Kabul. When she reached Aligarh, Babur sent two litters with three horsemen. She went on post haste from Aligarh to Agra. Babur had intended to go as far as Aligarh to meet her. At evening prayer time, someone came and informed Babur that he had just passed Maham Begum on the road, four miles out. Babur did not wait for a horse to be saddled, but set out on foot. He met her near the house of Maham's advance camp. She wished to alight, but he would not wait; he joined her train and walked to his own house. Nine troopers with two sets of nine horses and the two extra litters which the Emperor had sent, and one litter which had been brought from Kabul, and about a hundred of Maham Begum's servants mounted on fine horses. After staying three months at Agra, Maham Begum went to Dholpur with Babur.

Maham Begum was the chief queen and the only one privileged to sit by the side of Babur on the throne of Mughal Empire. She was powerful, moody and spoiled, and it seems Babur denied her nothing. It is worth noting that "Babur speaks of his favorite wife, Maham Begum’s edict as a farman." During Humayun's illness, Babur walked round him and turned his face. He also exclaimed that he loved Humayun because he was the son of his favourite wife, saying, "Although I have other sons, I love none as I love your Humayun. I crave that this cherished child may have his heart's desire and live long, and I desire the kingdom for him and not for the others, because he has not his equal in distinction."

== As empress dowager ==
After Humayun was restored to health, Babur became ill and died in 1530. Humayun ascended the throne at twenty-three years of age. Maham Begum made an allowance of food twice daily, in the morning an ox and two sheep and five goats, and at afternoon prayer time five goats. She gave this from her own estate for two and a half years.

After Humayun's return from Chunar, Maham threw a great feast. They lit up the bazaars and then she gave orders to the elites and soldiers to decorate their places and make their quarters beautiful. After this illumination became common in India. She gave special robes of honour to 7,000 persons. The festivities lasted several days.

== Death ==
In April 1533, Maham was attacked by a disorder of the bowels. On 8 May, she died.

== Popular culture ==
Maham Begum was portrayed by Sahher Bambba in the Hotstar web series The Empire released on 27 August 2021.

== Bibliography ==
- Amini, Iradj (June 1, 2013). The Koh-i-noor Diamond. Roli Books. ISBN 978-9-351-94035-7.
- Chandrababu, B. S.; Thilagavathi, L. (2009). Woman, Her History and Her Struggle for Emancipation. Bharathi Puthakalayam. ISBN 978-8-189-90997-0.
- Erskine, William (January 1, 1994). History of India Under Baber. Atlantic Publishers & Dist. ISBN 978-8-171-56032-5.
- Lal, Muni (1997). Babar: Life and Times. Vikas Publishing House. ISBN 978-0-706-90484-0.
- Lal, Ruby (2005). Domesticity and power in the early Mughal world. Cambridge University Press. ISBN 978-0-521-85022-3.
- Luniya, Bhanwarlal Nathuram (1969). Some Historians of Medieval India. Lakshmi Narain Agarwal.
- Mehta, J. L. (1986). Advanced Study in the History of Medieval India. Sterling Publishers. ISBN 978-8-120-71015-3.
- Mukhia, Harbans (2004). The Mughals of India. Malden, MA: Wiley-Blackwell. ISBN 9780631185550.
- Nath, Ram (1982). History of Mughal architecture. Vol. 1. Abhinav. p. 113. ISBN 978-0-391-02650-6.
- Nath, Renuka (January 1, 1990). Notable Mughal and Hindu women in the 16th and 17th centuries A.D. Inter-India Publications. ISBN 978-8-121-00241-7.
- Pawar, Kiran, ed. (1996). Women in Indian history: social, economic, political and cultural perspectives. Vision & Venture.
- Schimmel, Annemarie (2004). The Empire of the Great Mughals: History, Art and Culture. Reaktion Books. ISBN 978-1-861-89185-3.
- Smith, Bonnie G. (2008). The Oxford Encyclopedia of Women in World History: 4 Volume Set. Oxford University Press. ISBN 978-0-195-14890-9.
- Wade, Bonnie C. (July 20, 1998). Imaging Sound: An Ethnomusicological Study of Music, Art, and Culture in Mughal India. University of Chicago Press. ISBN 978-0-226-86840-0.

Maham Begum Mughal Empire
Regnal titles
| Preceded by Position established | Padshah Begum; 20 April 1526 - 27 April 1535 | Succeeded by Bega Begum |
