= Shahzada Khanum =

- Princess of the Mughal Empire
- Born: 21 November 1569; Akbarabad, Mughal Empire
- Died: Unknown; Mughal Empire
- Spouse: Muzaffar Husain Mirza
- Dynasty: Timurid Dynasty
- Father: Akbar
- Religion: Islam

Khanum Sultan Begum (Persian: خانم سلطان بیگم; born 21 November 1569), better known as Shahzada Khanum (Persian: شھزادہ خانم) was a Mughal princess, the second surviving child and eldest daughter of Mughal Emperor Akbar.

== Biography ==
Born on 21 November 1569, Shahzada Khanum was the eldest daughter of the Mughal Emperor Akbar. Her mother was a royal concubine, on whose death on 13 May 1599, she was deeply grieved, and Akbar "soothed her somewhat by sympathy and counsels." Akbar received the news of her birth when he reached Gwalior, named her Khanum Sultan and ordered rejoicings. She was placed under the care of her grandmother, Hamida Banu Begum.

She was well respected by her older half-brother, Jahangir who remarked – "Among all my sisters, in integrity, truth, and zeal for my welfare, she is without her equal; but her time is principally devoted to the worship of her creator."

Her husband was Muzaffar Husain Mirza, the son of Prince Ibrahim Husain Mirza, a descendant of Prince Umar Sheikh Mirza, second son of Amir Timur. His mother was Princess Gulrukh Begum, the daughter of Prince Kamran Mirza, son of the first Mughal emperor Babur, and brother of the next emperor Humayun. He had a sister named Princess Nur-un-Nissa Begum, married to Emperor Jahangir in 1592. The marriage took place on 2 September 1594 in the quarters of Hamida Banu.

Shahzada maintained relations of kinship with her sister-in-law, Nur-un-Nissa, and strictly observed the rules of courtesy and proper behaviour towards her.
