= Shahar Banu Begum =

- Shahzadi of Bijapur
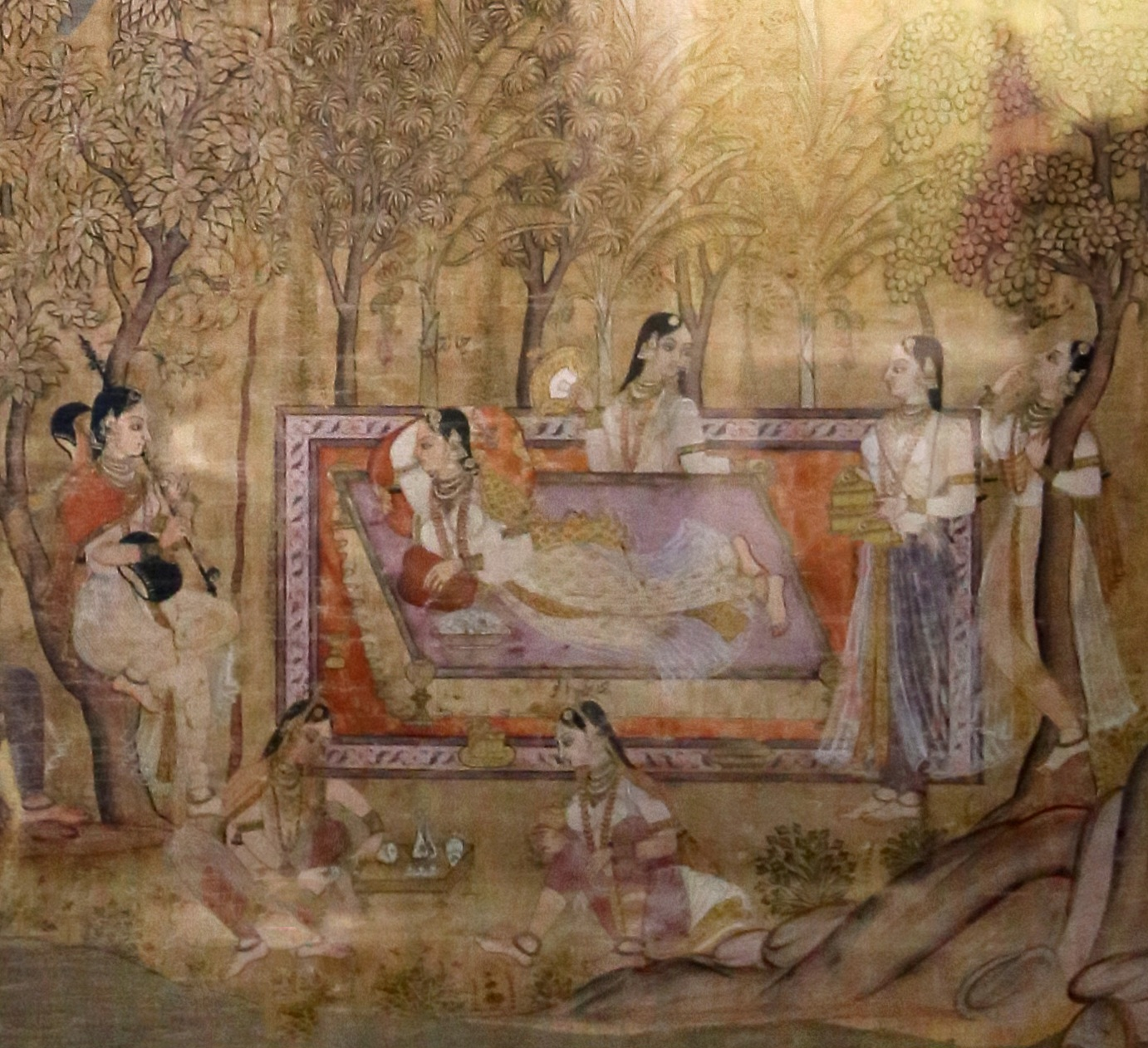
- Depiction of Shahar Banu Begum, c.17th century

Empress consort of the Mughal Empire
- Tenure: 14 March 1707 – 20 June 1707
- Born: c. 1663; Bijapur, India
- Spouse: Muhammad Azam Shah (m. 1672; d. 1707)
Names
- Shahar Banu
- House: Adil Shahi (by birth); Timurid (by marriage)
- Father: Ali Adil Shah II
- Mother: Khurshida Khanum
- Religion: Islam

Shahar Banu Begum (c. 1663 – ?) was Empress consort of the Mughal Empire from 14 March 1707 to 8 June 1707 as the third (and last) wife of Emperor Muhammad Azam Shah. She is popularly known by the titles Padishah Bibi and Padshah Begum.

By birth, Shahar Banu was a princess of the Adil Shahi dynasty of Bijapur and the daughter of Ali Adil Shah II and his consort Khurshida Khanum. She was the sister of Sikandar Adil Shah.

== Family and lineage ==
Shahar Banu Begum was born a princess of the Adil Shahi dynasty of Bijapur and the daughter of Ali Adil Shah II and his consort Khurshida Khanum. Shahar's paternal grandparents were Mohammed Adil Shah, her father's predecessor and his Queen consort Taj Jahan Begum. Shahar's siblings included her two brothers, the princes Hussain and Sikandar, the latter succeeding her father as King in 1672 at the age of four.

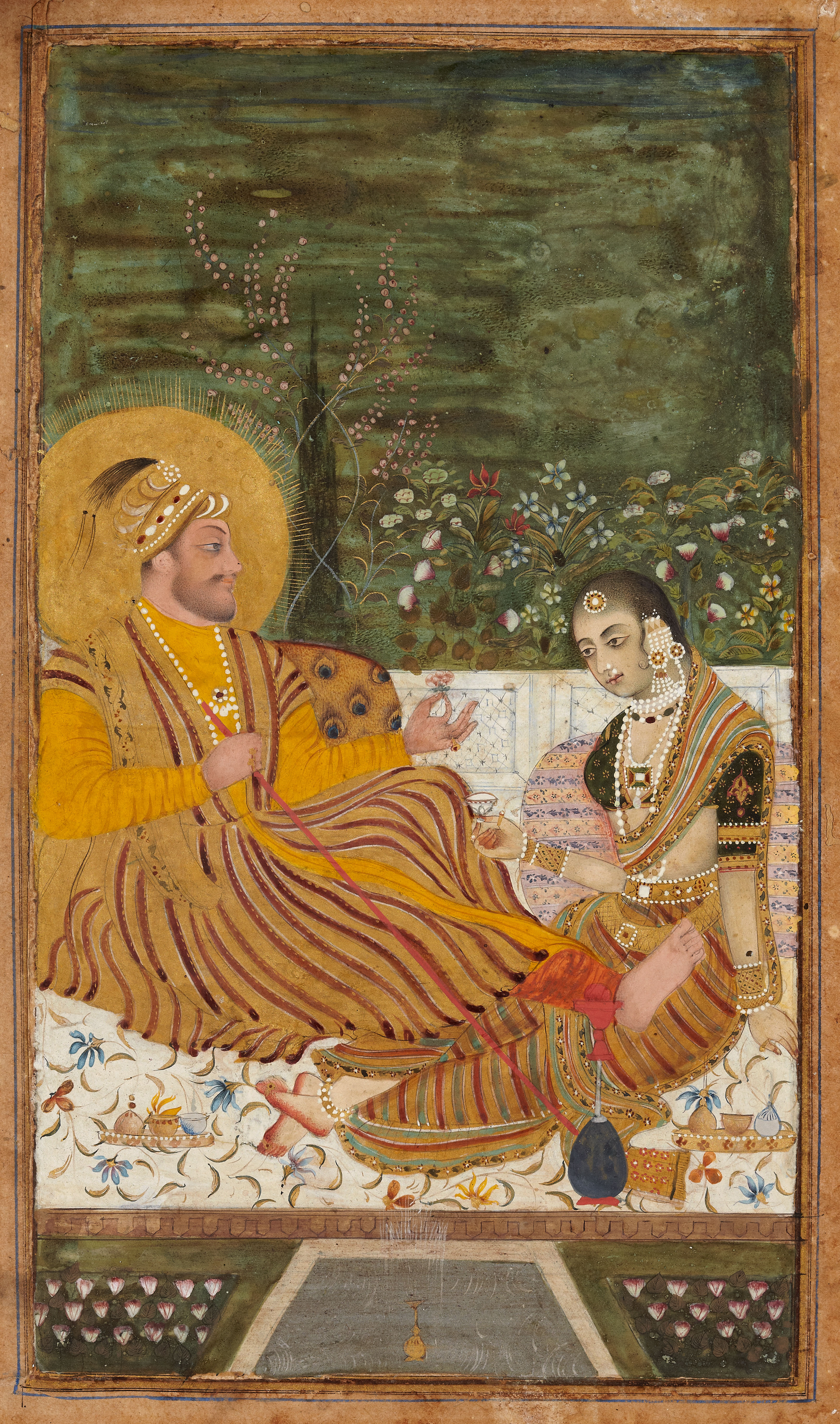
Sultan Ali Adil Shah of Bijapur with an unnamed consort, 1660-75

By all accounts, Shahar was greatly loved by the people of Bijapur as well as by her family. She was very beautiful as well as intelligent. The princess was courageous and devoted to her kingdom for she herself played a great part in her state's defense in 1679 when she was forcibly married for a political alliance.

== Marriage ==
Ali Adil Shah died on 24 November 1672, and with him departed the glory of the Kingdom of Bijapur. He was succeeded by his infant son, the four-year-old Sikandar Adil Shah, a period of anarchy ensued which ended only with the extinction of the dynasty and the independence of the Kingdom in 1686. The weakness and humiliation of Bijapur during this period is illustrated by the defection of 10,000 Bijapuris to the rival Mughal camp and the compulsory submission of Sikandar's sister, Shahar, to the Mughal harem. The promise to hand over the princess to the Mughals was made by Sikandar's regent, Khawas Khan, who was later assassinated for his treachery by his successor Abdul Karim. A peace treaty between Bijapur and the Mughals was signed by the terms of which Princess Shahar was to be wed to the imperial prince, Muhammad Azam Shah, the eldest son and heir-apparent of the reigning Mughal emperor Aurangzeb and his consort Dilras Banu Begum.

The idol of her family and the people of Bijapur, the princess left the city of her birth on 1 July 1679, amidst the wailings of her family and her dear ones to enter her future husband's hated seraglio for it was her willing sacrifice for the welfare of the Bijapuri state. She arrived at the Emperor's court on 4 March 1680 and was married to Muhammad Azam on 26 July 1681. The emperor tied the sehra and Qazi Sheikh-ul-lslam celebrated the marriage in the jama masjid (congregational mosque) of Khas & Am. In accordance with the example of Muhammad (at his marriage with Khadija), the mehr was fixed at 500 dirhams.

== Role in Mughal-Bijapur relations ==
Shortly after her marriage, Shahar was induced by her father-in-law, Aurangzeb, to pacify relations between the Mughals and Bijapur by addressing a letter to Sharza Khan, the new regent of her brother, to dissuade him from allying with the Marathas and to join the Mughals with the common objective of crushing them. The princess, recently married to Prince Azam, complied and sent a personal appeal to Sharza Khan on 18 July, saying, "Help the imperialists loyally for the good of the Bijapuri state. Conquer the infidels possessions." But no reply came. The Bijapuri grandees had secretly aligned with the Maratha king Sambhaji and strengthened him with an alliance.
