= Al-aman Mirza =

Mughal prince (1528–1536)

Al-Aman
- Shahzada of the Mughal Empire
- Born: November 1528; Badakshan, Mughal Empire (present-day Afghanistan)
- Died: 1536 (aged 7–8)
- House: Mughal dynasty
- Dynasty: Timurid dynasty
- Father: Humayun
- Mother: Bega Begum

Al-aman (Persian: الامان‌میرزا; November 1528 – 1536) was a Mughal prince and the eldest son of the Mughal Emperor Humayun and his first wife and chief consort Bega Begum.

== Birth ==
Al-aman Mirza was born in Badakshan, present-day Afghanistan, and was his father's first child and eldest son. Upon the prince's birth, his grandfather, the Emperor Babur, heavily congratulated Humayun and his wife, but criticized the couple for naming the child 'Al-aman', a name which, according to him, was grammatically incorrect and ominous in its connotation. Babur commemorated the birth of his first grandson both by mentioning it and by preserving his own congratulatory letter to Humayun in his memoir, the Baburnama.

Being the Emperor's eldest son, Al-aman Mirza was the heir-apparent to his father but died in childhood.
