= Saliha Banu Begum =

Padshah Begum of the Mughal Empire

- Empress consort of the Mughal Empire
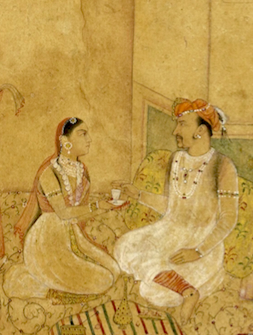
- Saliha Banu Begum and Jahangir, c.1620

Padshah Begum
- Tenure: 1608 – 10 June 1620
- Predecessor: Hamida Banu Begum
- Successor: Nur Jahan
- Died: 10 June 1620; Agra, Mughal Empire
- Spouse: Jahangir (m. 1608)
- House: Timurid (by marriage)
- Father: Qaim Khan
- Religion: Islam

Saliha Banu Begum (Persian: صالحہ بانو بیگم; d. 10 June 1620) was the chief consort of Emperor Jahangir. She was the Padshah Begum for the most part of the reign of her emperor husband until her death in the year 1620.

== Family ==
Saliha Banu Begum was the daughter of Qaim Khan, and the granddaughter of Muqim Khan, the son of Shuja'at Khan from Akbar's time.

== Marriage ==
Jahangir married her in 1608, in the third year of his reign. As a result, her brother Abdur Rahim's position was greatly enhanced. He was awarded the title of Tarbiyat Khan. His son, Miyan Joh, whom Saliha had taken for her son, was killed on the banks of the river Jhelum by Mahabat Khan when the latter behaved insolently towards Jahangir.

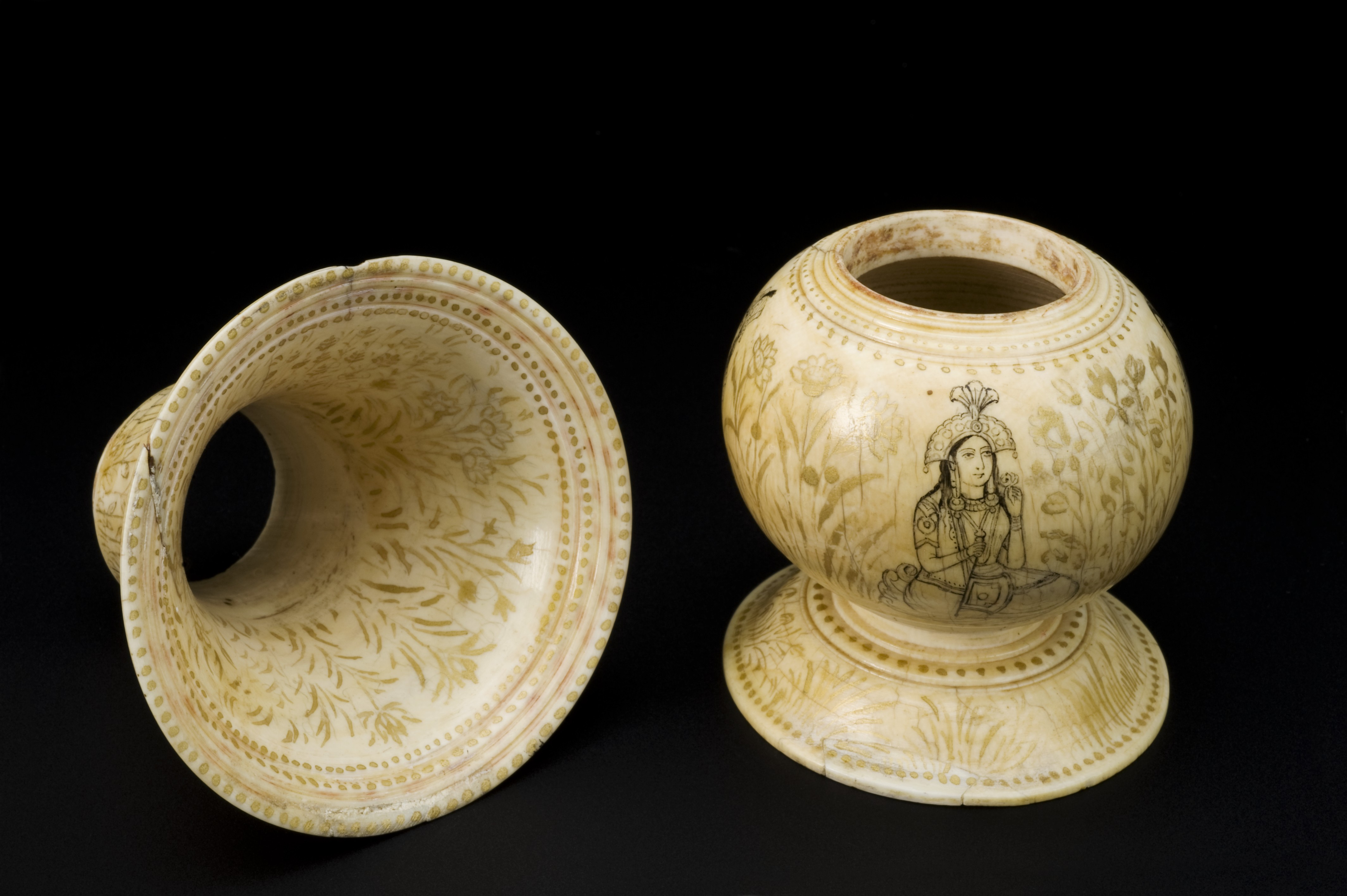
Depiction of a wife of Jahangir, possibly Saliha

She held the titles of Padishah Mahal ("Sovereign of the Palace") and Padishah Banu ("The Sovereign Lady"). She was, reportedly, Nur Jahan's only powerful rival for Jahangir's affections. However, Nur Jahan was a formidable rival who had dominated not only Jahangir but also governmental affairs. Williams Hawkins, a representative of the English East India Company noted her among Jahangir's chief wives. He said the following:

Hee (Jahangir) hath .... three hundred wives whereof four be chiefe as queenes, to say, the first, named Padasha Banu, daughter to Kaime Chan (Qaim Khan); the second is called Noore Mahal (Nur Jahan), the daughter of Gais Beyge (Mirza Ghiyas Beg); the third is the daughter of Seinchan (Zain Khan Koka); the fourth is the daughter of Hakim Humaun (Mirza Muhammad Hakim), who was brother to his father Ekber Padasha (Akbar)

Saliha Banu Begum was reportedly to be well versed in Hindi poetry.

== Death ==
Saliha Banu Begum died on 10 June 1620. Jahangir noted that her death had been foretold by the astrologer Jotik Rai; grief stricken at her loss, he nevertheless marveled at the accuracy of the prophecy, which had been taken from his own horoscope.

== See also ==
- Padshah Begum

== Bibliography ==
- Awrangābādī, Shāhnavāz Khān; Prasad, Bani; Shāhnavāz, 'Abd al-Hayy ibn (1979). The Maāthir-ul-umarā: being biographies of the Muḥammadan and Hindu officers of the Timurid sovereigns of India from 1500 to about 1780 A.D. Janaki Prakashan.
