= Padshah Begum =

Mughal Empire title

Padshah Begum of the Mughal Empire
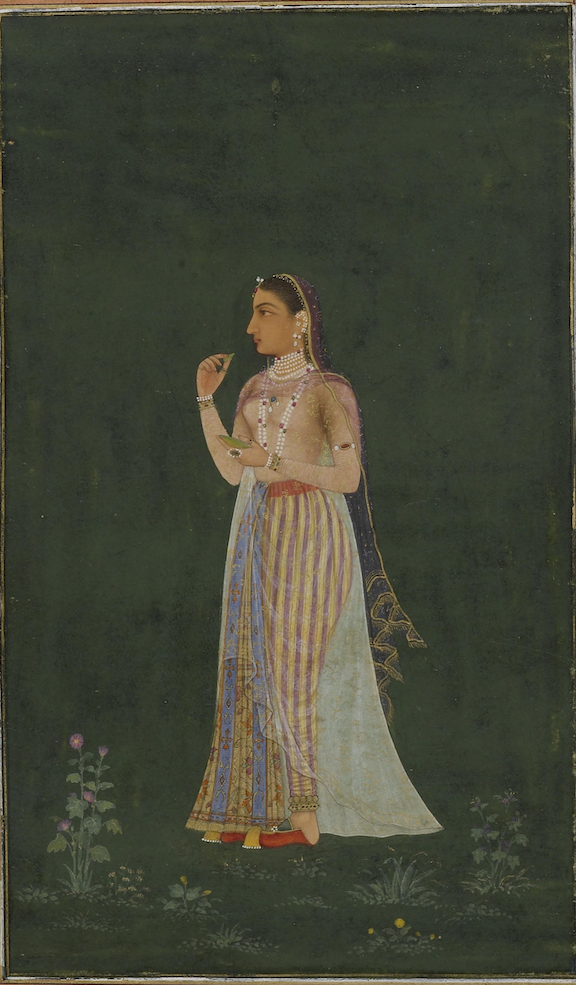
- Mughal princess Jahanara, Padshah Begum during the reigns of Shah Jahan and Aurangzeb
- Style: Her Imperial Majesty
- Residence: Agra Fort
- Appointer: Mughal Emperors
- Formation: 21 April 1526
- First holder: Maham Begum
- Final holder: Zeenat Mahal
- Abolished: 14 September 1857

Padshah Begum (Persian: پادشاه بیگم) was a superlative imperial title conferred upon the empress consort of the Mughal Empire and was considered to be the most important title in the Mughal harem or zenana. This title is generally equivalent to "Empress" or "First Lady" and signifies that its holder was entrusted with a portion of the emperor's authority and status.

== List of Padshah Begum ==
Padshah Begum	Tenure		Notes
Padshah Begum	From	Until	Notes
Maham Begum	1526	1530	Wife of Babur
Bega Begum	1530	1540	Wife of Humayun
Bega Begum	1555	1556	Wife of Humayun
Hamida Banu Begum	1556	1604	Mother of Akbar
Saliha Banu Begum	1608	1620	Wife of Jahangir
Nur Jahan	1620	1627	Wife of Jahangir
Mumtaz Mahal	1628	1631	Wife of Shah Jahan
Jahanara Begum	1631	1658	Daughter of Shah Jahan; Sister of Aurangzeb
Jahanara Begum	1669	1681	Daughter of Shah Jahan; Sister of Aurangzeb
Roshanara Begum	1658	1669	Daughter of Shah Jahan; Sister of Aurangzeb
Zinat-un-Nissa Begum	1681	1721	Daughter of Aurangzeb
Badshah Begum	1721	1789	Daughter of Farrukhsiyar; Wife of Muhammad Shah
Zeenat Mahal	1840	1857	Wife of Bahadur Shah Zafar

== Etymology ==
Padeshah, Padshah, Padishah, or Badishah is a superlative royal title, composed of the Persian pād (master) and shāh (king), which was adopted by several monarchs claiming the highest rank, equivalent to that of an ancient Persian notion of "The Great" or "Great King", and later adopted by post-Achaemenid and Christian Emperors. Its Arabized pronunciation as Badshah was used by Mughal emperors, and Bashah or Pasha was used by Ottoman Sultans.

Begum, begam, baigum or beygum is a female royal and aristocratic title from Central and South Asia. It is the feminine equivalent of the title baig or bey, which in Turkic languages means chief or commander. It usually refers to the wife or daughter of a beg.

== Historical usage ==
The title of 'Padshah Begum' could only be bestowed upon the chief or principal wife, a sister, mother, or a favored daughter of the Mughal emperor and could not be held by more than one lady simultaneously. This was evidenced by the fact that Emperor Jahangir's wife, Nur Jahan, did not use this until the death of his chief wife, Saliha Banu Begum (the Padshah Begum).

Where the consorts of the Mughal emperors were concerned, the title could only be bestowed upon the chief wife of the emperor. The title was first bestowed upon Maham Begum, who was the chief wife of Emperor Babur. It was held by Bega Begum during the reign of Humayun. Akbar, bestowed this title over his mother, Hamida Banu Begum who bore it until her death 1604. Emperor Jahangir bestowed this title upon his chief wife, Saliha Banu Begum, and then to her successor (after her death), Nur Jahan. Emperor Shah Jahan bestowed this title upon his chief wife, Mumtaz Mahal but after she died, he bestowed it upon his daughter Jahanara Begum. Shahar Banu Begum was briefly called Padshah begum during the short reign of her husband Azam Shah, but it is unknown if the title was actually given to her. Emperor Muhammad Shah bestowed this title upon his chief wife Badshah Begum.

The title was also bestowed upon the daughter of the emperor, such as Emperor Shah Jahan's daughter, Princess Jahanara Begum, and Emperor Aurangzeb's daughter, Princess Zinat-un-Nissa, both of whom bore the title throughout their lives.

In some cases, the title was also bestowed upon the sister of the emperor. Aurangzeb bestowed the title on his sisters Roshanara Begum and Jahanara Begum. When a Timurid Shahzadi held the title it meant "Empress amongst princesses".

== In popular culture ==
- Badshah Begum, a 2022 Pakistani television drama based on the concept of Padshah Begum.

== See also ==
- Padshah
- Begum
- Mughal Empire
- List of Mughal empresses
