= Zainab Sultan Begum =

- Timurid princess Queen consort of the Ferghana Valley; Queen consort of the Kabul
- Died: c. 1506–07
- Spouse: Babur (m. 1504)
- House: Timurid (by birth)
- Father: Sultan Mahmud Mirza
- Mother: Khanzada Begum
- Religion: Islam

Zainab Sultan Begum was Queen consort of Ferghana Valley and Kabul as the second wife of Emperor Babur. Like two of her husband's other wives, Aisha Sultan Begum and Masuma Sultan Begum, she was a first cousin of Babur.

She was one of the first Mughal cousins to marry among the own family, which later became a common practice, which would be especially be followed by Humayun, the second Mughal emperor who succeeded Babur after his death in 1530.

== Family and lineage ==
Zainab Sultan Begum was born a Timurid princess and was the fifth daughter of Sultan Mahmud Mirza, who was Babur's paternal uncle. Her mother was the granddaughter of Mir Buzurg, and the daughter of a brother of Khanzada Begum, her father's first wife. Her father was a son of Abu Sa'id Mirza, the Emperor of the Timurid Empire.

Zainab's paternal uncles included Umar Sheikh Mirza, the ruler of Ferghana Valley, who later became her father-in-law as well while her first cousins included her future husband, Babur, and his elder sister, Khanzada Begum. Her sister Ai Begum, who was married to Babur's brother Jahangir Mirza, became her sister-in-law.

== Marriage ==
Babur married her after annexing Kabul in October 1504. However she was not a favorite wife of the emperor because she was too proud of her parentage and failed to win Babur's affection. He also did not remember the year of her death correctly.

Babur has written about the marriage of Sultan Mahmud Mirza to Khanzada Begum who was the daughter of Mir of Tirmiz. After she died, he married her late wife's niece Khandaza Begum through whom he fathered five daughters and a son. This created Babur's hatred for his uncle, and subsequently he was reluctant to marry Zainab. It was due to the repeated pleas and insistence of Babur's mother that he married her as he could not resist the "good offers" of his mother for this marriage. Babur did not want to marry her, because according to him, she was "not very congenial".

Historians however claim that Zainab Sultan Begum was the most influential lady in Babur's harem (due to her lineage), who had authority in controlling its activity though she was not a favourite wife of the first Mughal emperor.

== Death ==
Zainab Sultan Begum died childless two or three years after her marriage, that is in 1506 or 1507. Contemporary family members write that she died of small pox.
