= Hindal Mirza =

Mughal prince (1519–1551)

Hindal Mirza هندل میرزا
- Shahzada of the Mughal Empire; Mirza
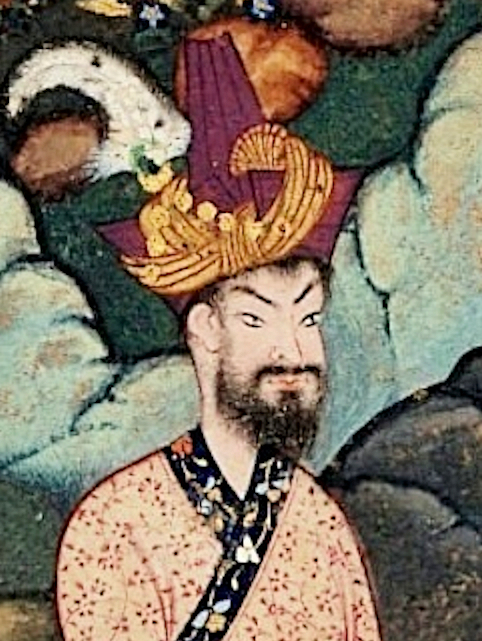
- 1546 portrait of Hindal Mirza

Ruler of Alwar, Mewat, Malwa and Ghazni
- Reign: 21 February 1531 – 20 November 1551
- Born: Abu'l-Nasir Muhammad; 4 March 1519; Kabul
- Died: 20 November 1551 (aged 32); Nangarhar, Sur Empire
- Burial: Gardens of Babur, Kabul
- Spouse: Sultanam Begum (m. 1537)
- Issue: Ruqaiya Sultan Begum
Names
- Abu'l-Nasir Muhammad Hindal Mirza ibn Mirza Zahir-ud-Din Muhammad Babur
- House: Mughal
- Dynasty: Timurid
- Father: Babur
- Mother: Dildar Begum (biological); Maham Begum (adoptive)
- Religion: Sunni Islam (Hanafi)

Abu'l-Nasir Muhammad (Persian: ابوالنصیر محمد; 4 March 1519 – 20 November 1551), better known by the sobriquet Hindal (Chagatai for 'Taker of India'), was a Mughal prince and the youngest son of Emperor Babur, the founder of the Mughal Empire and the first Mughal emperor. He was also the older brother of Gulbadan Begum (the author of Humayun-nama), the younger half-brother of the second Mughal emperor Humayun, as well as the paternal-uncle and father-in-law of the third Mughal emperor Akbar.

Hindal's long military career started at the age of ten, with his first appointment as a viceroy being in Badakshan, Afghanistan. The young prince subsequently proved himself to be a successful and courageous general. Thus, by the age of 19, Hindal was considered to be a strong and favourable contender for the Mughal throne as Humayun's successor by the imperial council, which despised his older brother. However, unlike his rebellious half-brother, Kamran Mirza, Hindal eventually pledged allegiance to Humayun and remained faithful to him till his untimely death in 1551, when he died fighting for the Mughals in a battle against Kamran Mirza's forces. He was survived by his wife and his only daughter, the princess Ruqaiya Sultan Begum, who married his nephew, Akbar, and became a Mughal queen in 1556.

== Early life ==
Abu'l-Nasir Muhammad was born on 4 March 1519 in Kabul to the first Mughal emperor Babur and his wife Dildar Begum. Upon hearing the news of his birth, Babur named his youngest son, Hindal (Turkish: "Indian subcontinent"), since the prince was born while he was on his way to conquer "Delhi Sultanate" which he felt was a good omen. Babur further commemorated the birth of his son in his memoir: the Baburnama. Two years after his birth, the prince and his sister, Gulbadan Begum, were placed in the care of Maham Begum, Babur's chief wife and the mother of Hindal's older half-brother, Humayun. Maham Begum had recently lost four children of her own in infancy, and wished to raise Hindal and his sister Gulbadan Begum in her own care.

Hindal's other siblings included his two sisters Gulrang Begum and Gulchehra Begum and a younger brother, Alwar Mirza, who died in his childhood. Among his siblings, Hindal was very close to his sister Gulbadan Begum. Gulbadan Begum's affection for him is further seen in how she writes about him in the Humayun-nama. Hindal had also been his father's favourite when Humayun lost favour with him at the time of his death in 1530. On his deathbed in Agra, Babur desperately asked for his youngest son, Hindal (who was fighting a campaign in Kabul at the time), instead of Humayun. This incident, hinted at the depth of the older prince's imperial disfavour.

=== Marriage and private life ===
In 1537, Hindal married his cousin, Sultanam Begum, in Agra. She was the daughter of Muhammad Musa Khwaja and the younger sister of Mahdi Khwaja, who was Babur's brother-in-law, being the husband of his sister, Khanzada Begum. Sultanam had been lovingly brought up by Hindal's childless aunt, Khanzada Begum, since she was a child and had been reared to become Hindal's wife in future.

In honour of their marriage, Khanzada Begum organized a grand feast, which is described in great detail in the Humayun-nama. The feast, known as the 'Mystic Feast' was a grand affair and in the words of Gulbadan Begum was "most splendid and entertaining", being attended by innumerable imperial and royal guests as well as high-ranking court amirs. Gulbadan further stated that such a wedding feast had not been organized previously for any other children of Babur. Mahdi Khwaja had presented his brother-in-law, Hindal, with a large amount of dowry and Khanzada Begum also gave extravagant gifts.

In 1541, when negotiations for Humayun's marriage with Hamida Banu Begum were going on, both Hindal and Hamida bitterly opposed the marriage proposal, possibly because they were involved with each other. It seems probable that Hamida was in love with Hindal, though there is only circumstantial evidence for it. In her book, the Humayun-nama, Hindal's sister and Hamida's close friend, Gulbadan Begum, pointed out that Hamida was frequently seen in her brother's palace during those days, and in the palace of their mother, Dildar Begum. Hamida's father, Shaikh Ali Akbar Jami, had also been one of Hindal's preceptors.

== Viceroyalty ==
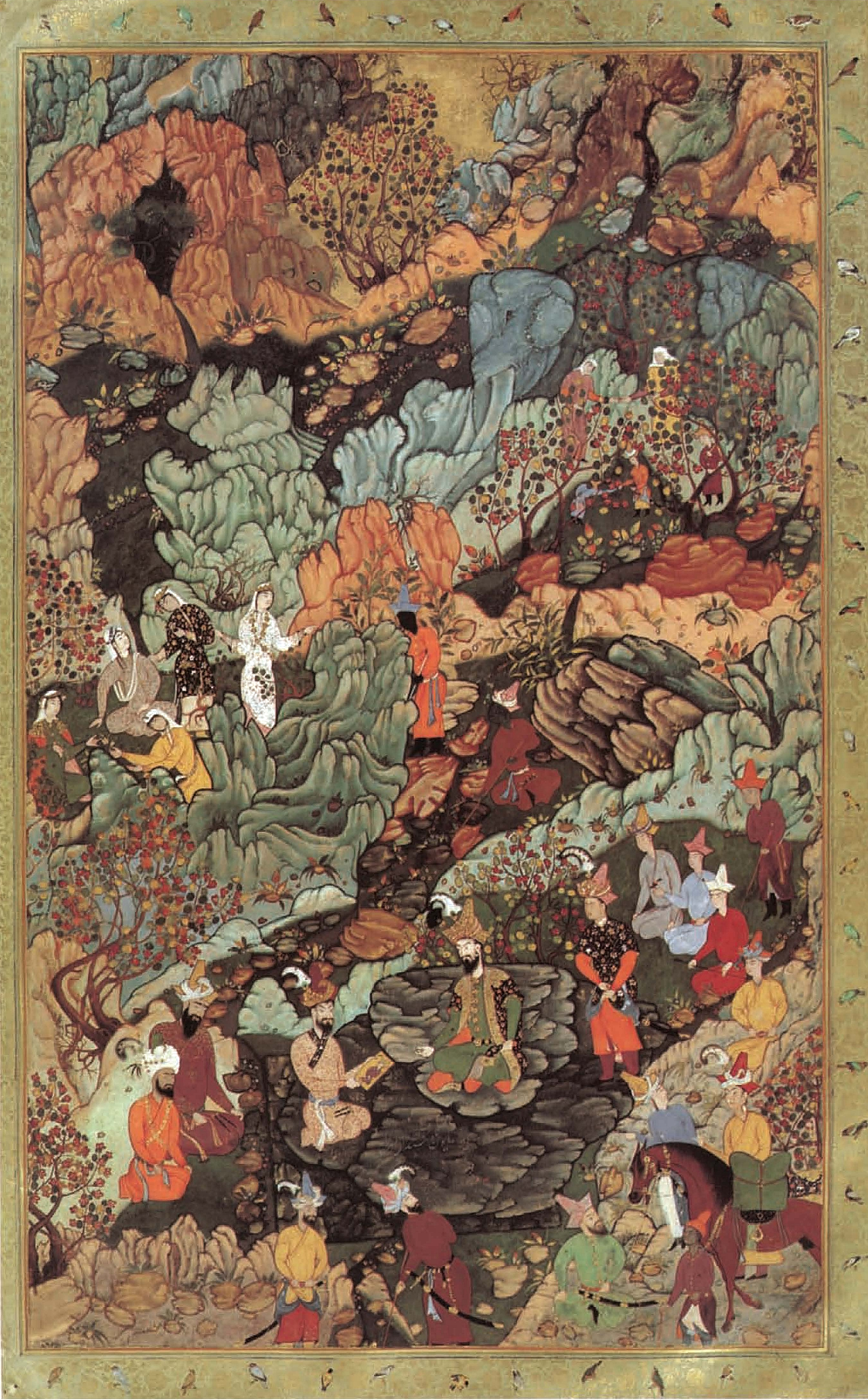
Hindal Mirza, presents young Akbar's portrait to Humayun, during Akbar's circumcision celebrations in Kabul, c. 1546 AD by Dust Muhammad

Hindal's first appointment as a viceroy was in Badakshan, Afghanistan, when the prince was merely ten years old. Hindal's older half-brothers Humayun and Kamran Mirza conferred and persuaded the young prince to take up the government of Badakshan. Upon invading India in 1525–6, Hindal was briefly awarded Badakshan again in 1529 by Babur. At the time of his father's death in 1530, the eleven-year-old Hindal was serving as the viceroy of Kabul, and was also the viceroy of Qandahar at a later time.

Upon Humayun's accession to the throne in the same year, Hindal was granted Babur's favourite retreat of Alwar, in addition to the governorship of Malwa. Further, Humayun granted the province of Ghazni and Mewat (among others) as Hindal's jagir, while Kamran was granted Qandahar. Hindal, however, attempted to withdraw into seclusion in Badakshan, seemingly in repudiation of Kamran Mirza's rebellion. When the Mughals conquered India again in 1541, one third portion of it was owned by Hindal.

== Siege of Kannauj ==
In 1537, Sher Shah Suri had gradually overrun all the countries on the southern or Behar side of the Ganges; and Muhammad Sultan Mirza, had raised the standard of revolt in the upper provinces. The long absence of the Emperor Humayun had latterly encouraged them to act with greater boldness and security. Muhammad Sultan, having gained possession of a great portion of the countries on the left bank of the Ganges, had fixed the seat of his government at Bilgram, opposite to Kannauj, and had gained sufficient strength to send his son, Ulugh Mirza, with a large force to besiege Juanpur; while Shah Mirza, another of his sons, reduced Kara-Manikpur. Kannauj too had fallen into his hands.

Hindal Mirza, whom Humayun had left in command at Agra, marched to quell this revolt, and soon retook Kannauj. As soon as Muhammad Sultan Mirza heard of his approach, he called in all his detachments, and was joined by Shah Mirza, while Ulugh Mirza wrote to say that he would hasten with all possible speed to meet him; at the same time urging him not to hazard a battle till his arrival. Muhammad Sultan and Shah Mirza, encamping on the left bank of the river, used every exertion to obstruct the passage of the imperial army. Hindal, however, eager to engage the enemy before Ulugh Mirza could join them, having discovered a fort ten miles above Kannauj, left his camp standing, and effected a passage, unobserved, with all his troops.

The two armies soon met face-to-face; but when they were on the point of engaging, a strong north-wester rising, blew such clouds of dust right in the eyes of the insurgents that they could not keep their position. The imperial army, who had the wind on their backs, availing themselves of their advantage, pressed hard upon their enemy, whose retreat was soon converted into a flight. Hindal, after taking possession of Bilgram and the surrounding country, pursued the remainder of the fleeing army, as they marched to form a junction with Ulugh Mirza. He overtook them at Oudh where Muhammad Sultan and his sons, having concentrated all their forces, halted to check his advance. The two armies lay opposite to each other for nearly two months, when news arrived that Humayun had left Mandu, and was on his way back to Agra. This decided Muhammad Sultan to bring on an action, as his only chance of safety. He marched out of his trenches; and engagement ensued, in which the imperial troops had the advantage. The insurgents, dispirited by their continued want of success, began to despair, and soon after dispersed. Muhammad Sultan Mirza, and three of his sons, fled to Kuch-Behar; while Hindal Mirza, following up on his advantage went on to Juanpur. Having soon after heard of Humayun's arrival at the capital, he left the army and joined his brother there.

== Revolt at Agra and proclamation as Emperor ==
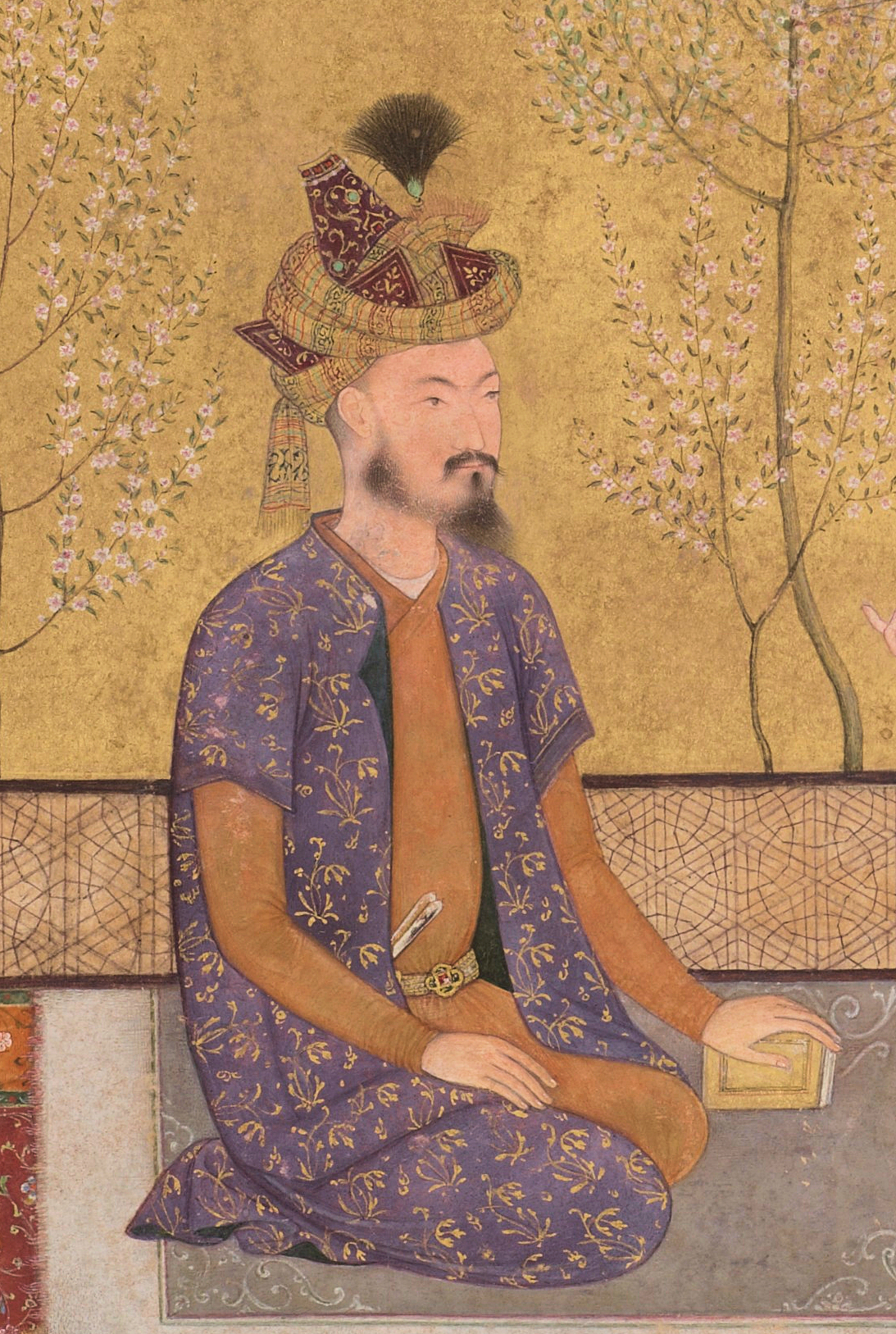
Hindal's older brother, the Emperor Humayun

In 1538, Humayun received reports from Agra that his younger half-brother, Hindal, had put to death Sheikh Bhul, soon after his arrival, had thrown of his allegiance, had assumed all the ensigns of sovereignty; and caused himself to be proclaimed Emperor. At first, the Emperor did not believe the news and found it unfounded and impossible, but he soon found out that it was no time to linger on. Humayun entered Bengal and proceeded to Gour, Hindal Mirza, instead of remaining to keep the rebels in check, and maintain the communications with grand army, taking advantage of the season, abandoned his post and set out for Agra, without leave. His absence, and the death of Hindu Beg, had encouraged and enabled Sher Shah Suri to pass the Ganges and take Benaras, defeat Yusuf Beg, and lay siege to Juanpur; besides cutting off all the communications of Humayun's army. Hindal, who was now twenty years old, misled by the counselors who so often surround an aspiring prince, and incite him to sacrifice every duty for his own ambitions, on his arrival to Agra, entered the city, took possession of the Emperor's palace, issued his orders as if vested with absolute power, and seemed to direct his views to the throne itself.

=== Siege of Jaunpur ===
Alarmed at the course which Hindal was pursuing, Humayun hastened down to Agra to meet the prince and represented to him in the strongest terms the danger to which he was exposing the power and the very existence of the Chughtai race in India. He pointed out that it was a moment when, instead of destroying everything by discord and disunion, it was essential that every friend of the House of Timur, should exert himself, to break the rapidly increasing power of Sher Khan and the Pashtuns. By such remonstrances, he prevailed upon Hindal to leave the city to cross over the Jamna into the Doab, and there collect whatever forces could be brought together, to march and raise the siege of Juanpur. The Emperor's cousin and brother-in-law, Yadgir Nasir Mirza, who commanded Kalpi, was induced by Mir Fakhir Ali to put his troops in motion so as to form a junction with those of Hindal in the territory of Karra, so that they might thence proceed in concert to Juanpur.

=== Possibility of accession ===
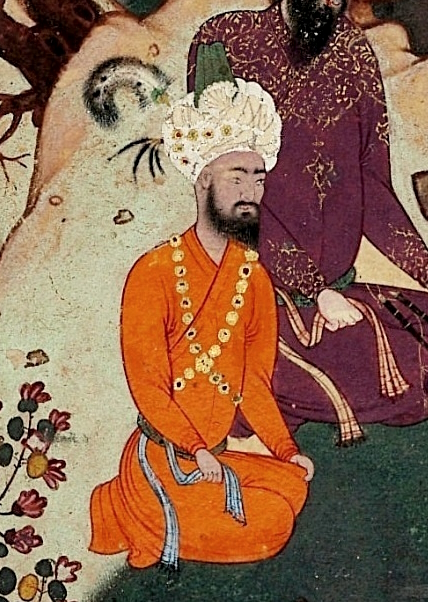
Possible contemporary depiction of Yadgar-Nasir Mirza, son of Nasir Mirza, a half-brother of Babur. 1546 in Kabul, by Dust Muhammad.

At this time, Zahid Beg, Khusrau Beg Kokiltash, Haji Muhammad Baba Khushke, and other discontented and turbulent nobles, who had fled from Bengal, arrived, and had secret communications with Nur-ud-din Muhammad Mirza, the governor of Kanauj, who had married Gulrang Begum, Hindal's sister, and who seems to have been privy to his designs. Nur-ud-din wrote to Hindal Mirza, announcing the arrival of these noblemen, and at the same time forwarded to him a petition from them, asking his favour and protection, and proffering their own duties and services. To this address the Mirza, who, in spite of his change of conduct, had still a strong leaning to his treasonable purposes, returned a gracious answer, which he gave to Muhammad Ghazi Taghai, one of his trusty adherents, by whom he at the same time wrote to inform Yadgar Nasir Mirza, and Mir Fakhir Ali, of the arrival of the Amirs.

The Amirs did not wait at Kanauj for his answer, but proceeded to Kol, a jagir of Zahid Beg's. Hindal's envoy, hearing of this movement, instead of first going to Yadgar, went straight to meet them. The conspirators, finding that Hindal was irresolute or insincere, and being themselves desperate, told the envoy, explicitly, that their mind was made up; that they had forever shaken off their allegiance to the Emperor; that, if Hindal would assume the imperial dignity, and read the khutba in his own name, they were to be his most faithful subjects. But if not, that they would straightway repair to Kamran Mirza, and make him the same offer, which would not be refused. The envoy, returning to Hindal, reported what had passed, and added in his own opinion; that the Mirza was so far committed as to have only one of two measures to adopt. He must either at once call in the Amirs, accede to their advice, and declare himself Emperor; or get them into his power, cast them into prison, and treat them as rebels. Hindal, whose mind was misled by high and dazzling projects, was not long of coming to a decision on this alternative. He agreed to accept to the proposal of the fugitive nobles and to raise the standard of rebellion.

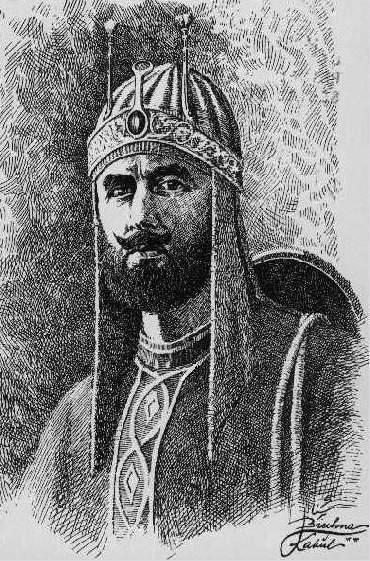
Sher Shah Suri, the usurper to the rule of Emperor Humayun

It was at this very juncture that Sheikh Bhul or Behlul, who had been sent by Humayun from Gour, on a mission to the Mirza, arrived near Agra. Sheikh Bhul was revered by Humayun, as his religious teacher and spiritual guide, and had acted as a councillor to Hindal himself. Hindal, on hearing of his approach, went out and received him with much honour. Bhul had been sent from Bengal by the Emperor, when he had first heard of the Mirza's defection, to reason with him on the folly of his proceedings. Bhul brought assurances from Humayun, not only of forgiveness for his past misconduct, but of every favour and exaltation for the future, that the affection and generosity of a prince and brother could bestow. The weak and wavering mind of Hindal was shaken by these remonstrances of duty and wisdom. He had not yet made any irrevocable manifestation of his rebellious intentions, and was once more persuaded to return to his allegiance, and to join in an active effort to drive the common enemy out of the field, free his sovereign from distress and peril. The very next day, he sent to make fresh requisitions from Muhammad Bakshi, the governor, of such a quantity of warlike stores and equipments, arms, cattle, money etc. as would enable him to put his army instantly in motion and to proceed to the relief of Juanpur.

=== Siege of Delhi ===
Unfortunately Nur-ud-din arrived while these measures were being expedited and he was able to destroy the whole effect of Sheikh Bhul's mission, and Hindal was persuaded once more to accept the support of the rebel nobles, for which they demanded the sacrifice of Sheikh Bhul as he had caused Hindal to break his former promises to them. They hoped that Hindal, involved in such a disgraceful crime, would irretrievably be separated from Humayun, whom they hated and despised. A frivolous charge of conspiracy with Sher Khan was laid and the Sheikh was executed under the orders of Nur-ud-din. Such a crime revolted the ladies of the harem and all the officers who had remained faithful to Humayun. It marked the destruction of Hindal's ambitious designs, for when he advanced on Delhi instead of marching to assist the Emperor, Yadgar Nasir and Fakhir Ali forestalled him by hasty marches and reached the city before he arrived. While Hindal was unsuccessfully besieging Delhi, his step-brother, Kamran Mirza, arrived from Punjab. After successfully capturing Kandahar, Kamran completed his domination over all of Afghanistan and Punjab. Now, in 1539, he moved towards Humayun's territory and Hindal, uncertain of his intentions, abandoned the siege of Delhi and withdrew to Agra.

Although Kamran was persuaded to leave Delhi untouched and to follow Hindal to Agra, his intentions were completely selfish. On Kamran's approach, Hindal withdrew to his own government at Alwar, but soon was persuaded to offer his submission, together with the rebel officers who were almost his sole adherents. The brothers set out as if to help march to Humayun's help, but the ambition of Kamran and the weakness of Hindal made them yield to the suggestion of nobles that if Sher Khan defeated Humayun, the Empire would fall to his brother and that if the Emperor won he could be persuaded to forgive them. So after a few marches they turned back to Agra just as Humayun's affairs reached a crisis.

== Siege of Sehwan ==
In the summer of 1541, Hindal had repeatedly asked for the Emperor's permission to attack and occupy the rich province of Sehwan in Sindh, but was not allowed, due to an ongoing negotiation between the Emperor and Shah Hussein regarding some procurement of resources. However, as soon as the negotiations were made, Hindal was at length authorized to reduce the district, and informed that the Emperor himself would soon visit the prince's camp. Shah Hussein had fortified the town of Sehwan, and now ordered the surrounding country to be laid waste. Humayun, alarmed by some intimations that had reached to him, of Hindal's having a design to desert from him and march to Qandahar, quitted for a short time the gardens of Baberlu and proceeded to Hindal's camp. Five days later, he reached Paat, which lies about twenty miles west of Indus and was met by Hindal.

Here, negotiations for Humayun's marriage with Hamida Banu Begum began, and Hindal was so furious at the prospect of his brother's marriage with Hamida that he subsequently threatened to quit the Emperor's service. Hindal was much offended by his brother's conduct as he felt that Humayun had come to Paat to "do him honour and not to look out for a young bride". Hindal's mother, Dildar Begum, who overheard this altercation, interposed, reproved her son and attempted to settle the dispute. But, as Hindal refused to apologize for the unseemly language he had used, Humayun left the house in high displeasure. Hindal, on the other hand, soon left for Afghanistan just as the Emperor's men began to increasingly desert him.

== Death ==
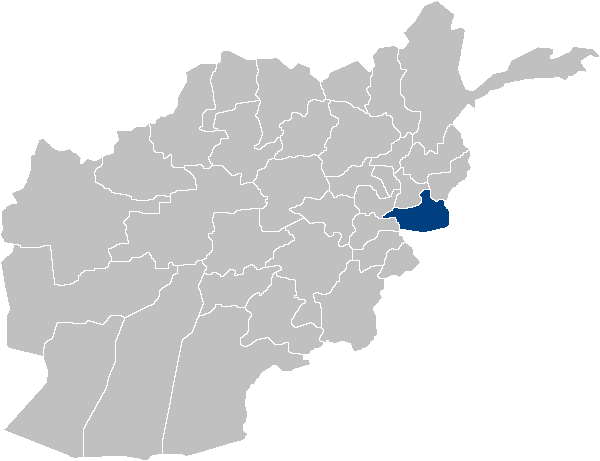
Nangarhar province location in present-day Afghanistan. The place where Hindal Mirza died.

On the eve of 20 November 1551, Hindal and Humayun had set camp in the province of Nangarhar, Afghanistan, the brothers learned that Kamran Mirza was intending to attack the imperial camp that night with a body of Khalil and Pashtun soldiers. Despite various security measures, about the end of the first watch of the night, an attack was made accordingly. The Emperor was on the rising ground; Hindal in the camp below. The onset of the attack was furious and continued hot for some time, each offer defending his own portions of work, some part of which, however, the enemy succeeded in scaling, and entered the enclosure. Some men of note were slain; all was confusion and uncertainty, friend and foes being mixed together and covered by the darkness of the night, but soon the imperialists recovered their superiority.

The assailants took to flight, but Hindal had fallen in the fray. "When the affair was over" says Jouher, "and his Majesty (Humayun) inquired for his brother Hindal, no one had the courage to tell him." Humayun then called out aloud from the height; but, although surrounded by three hundred persons, none answered. The Emperor ordered Abdal Wahab to go and bring news of the prince. Wahab went in search of the prince, but was shot by one of the imperial army's own match-lock men, who mistook him for an Afghan. Mir Abdal Hai was next sent, and brought back the melancholy intelligence, which he communicated by two verses of a poet. The Emperor instantly retreated to his pavilion, where he was overwhelmed with grief, till his Amirs came and consoled him, saying that his brother was blessed, in having thus fallen a martyr in the service of the Emperor.

It appears that Hindal, on hearing the news of the intended night-attack, had carefully visited all his trenches, after which he retired to his tent for some rest, when he was roused by the uproar and alarm occasioned by the onset of the Pashtuns. They had attacked the works on every side on foot, and a body had succeeded in getting over the prince's trenches in the dark night. Hindal started up, and hastened to meet and repel the assailants, having only his bow and arrow in hand. His men had hurried away in confusion, to protect their horses from being plundered, therefore none of Hindal's immediate servants were with him. He soon met a Pashtun face to face, and so near that it was necessary to get close with him. By main strength he had gained the upper hand, when his enemy's brother, Tirenda, a Mehmend Pashtun, came to his assistance, and slew the prince without knowing him.

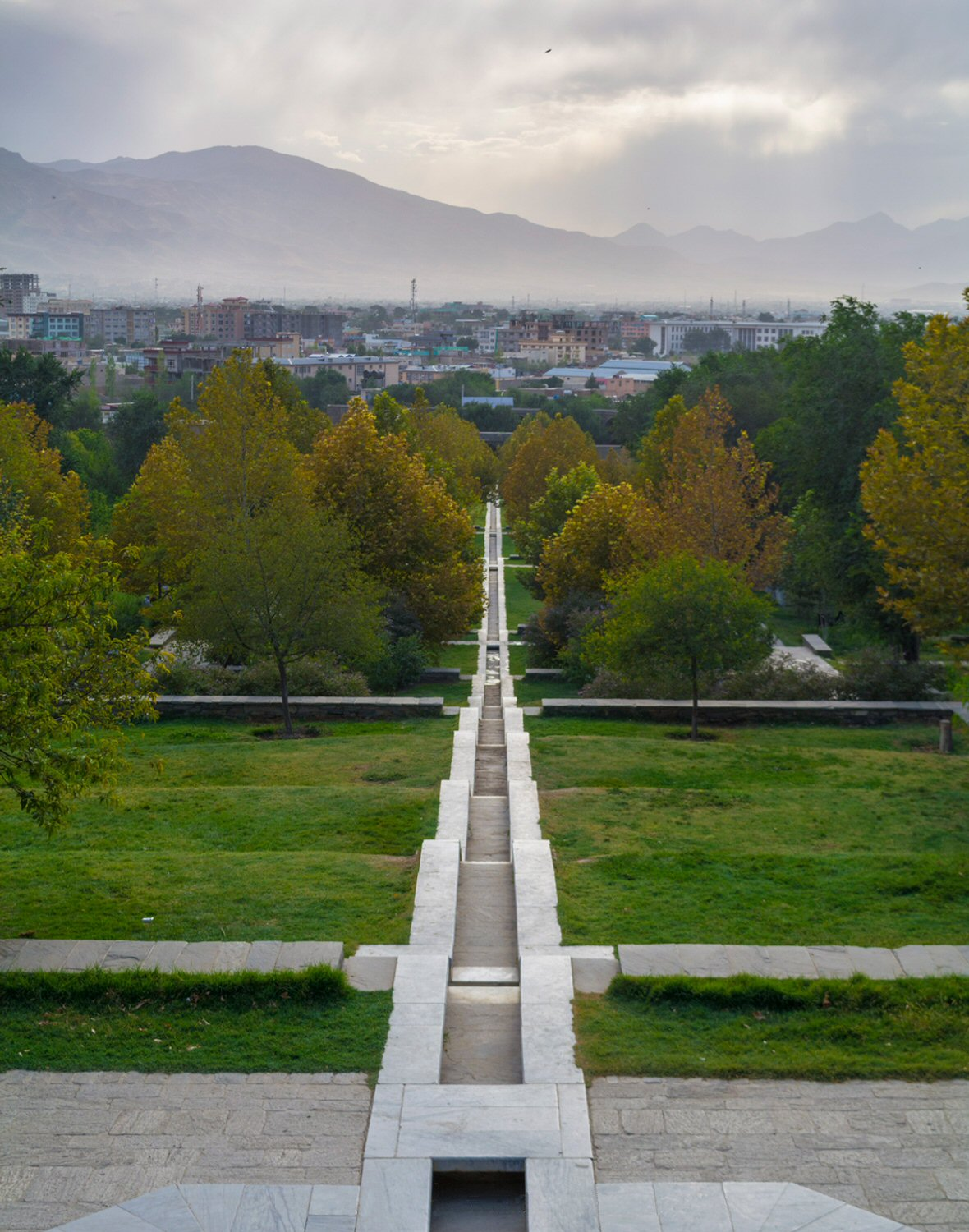
Inside the Gardens of Babur, located in Kabul, Afghanistan

When the battle was over, the Pashtuns brought Hindal's ornamented quiver and arrows, unknowing to him it belonged, and presented them to his brother, Kamran, as the spoils of a man of rank. Kamran no sooner saw the quiver, than he recognized it as his brother's, and dashed his turban on the ground in an agony of grief. Hindal's body was left for some time unnoticed, where it fell. After the first confusion, when the troops began to collect, and were returning to assail the Pashtuns, Khwaja Ibrahim, one of Hindal's servants when passing the prince's tent, saw, in the darkness of the night, a man in black armour lying on the ground. He did not stop at first, but pushed on towards the Pashtuns, till he recollected that Hindal had that evening put on a black cuirass. Turning back, he examined the body, and found that it was the prince's. His right hand had been cut off, and some fingers on his left, apparently in his attempt to defend his head; and a cross blow, that had fallen on his mouth, had nearly separated the head from the one ear to the other.

With great presence of mind, Ibrahim carried the body to the prince's pavilion, where he laid it down and covered it with a cloak, ordering the porters to admit no one as the prince was fatigued with his exertions, and had received a trifling wound; and desired that no noise or bustle should be allowed, that could disturb him. When the enemy was finally repulsed, Ibrahim, mounted a rising ground, and in the prince's name returned thanks to the troops for their exertions which had secured the victory of the Mughals. His conduct was warmly applauded by the Emperor. Hindal's death bears testimony to the young prince's courage and pluck.

Hindal's remains were conveyed first to Jui-Shahi and after a time, to the Gardens of Babur in Kabul, where they were interred at the feet of his father, Emperor Babur. He was thirty-two years of age at the time of his death. Following the period of mourning, Humayun transferred Hindal's followers, estates, military command, and the province of Ghazni, one of his jagirs, to the nine-year-old Prince Akbar, appointing him as its viceroy. Around the same time, out of affection for the memory of his brother, Humayun arranged the betrothal of Hindal's daughter, Ruqaiya Sultan Begum, to Akbar. Contemporary and later sources clarify that the transfer of Hindal's followers, estates, military command, and Ghazni formed part of Akbar's elevation within the Mughal imperial system, rather than a marital inheritance arising from his betrothal to Ruqaiya.

== In popular culture ==
- Hindal Mirza is a principal character in Alex Rutherford's historical novel Empire of the Moghul: Brothers at War (2010).

== See also ==
- Timurid dynasty

== Bibliography ==
- Begum, Gulbadan (1902). The History of Humayun (Humayun-Nama). Royal Asiatic Society. ISBN 81-87570-99-7.
- Eraly, Abraham (2000). Emperors of the Peacock Throne: The Saga of the Great Mughals. Penguin Books. ISBN 978-0-14-100143-2.
- Erskine, William (1854). A History of India Under the Two First Sovereigns of the House of Taimur, Báber and Humáyun, Volume 2. Longman, Brown, Green, and Longmans. ISBN 1-108-04619-3.
- Lal, Muni (1978). Humayun. Vikas Publ. House. ISBN 978-0-7069-0645-5.
- Wheeler, Mortimer (1953). The Cambridge History of India: The Indus civilization. Supplementary volume. Cambridge University Press. ISBN 978-0-14-100143-2.
