= Kamran Mirza =

Shahzada of the Mughal Empire (c. 1509–1557)

Kamran Mirza کامران میرزا
- Shahzada of the Mughal Empire; Mirza
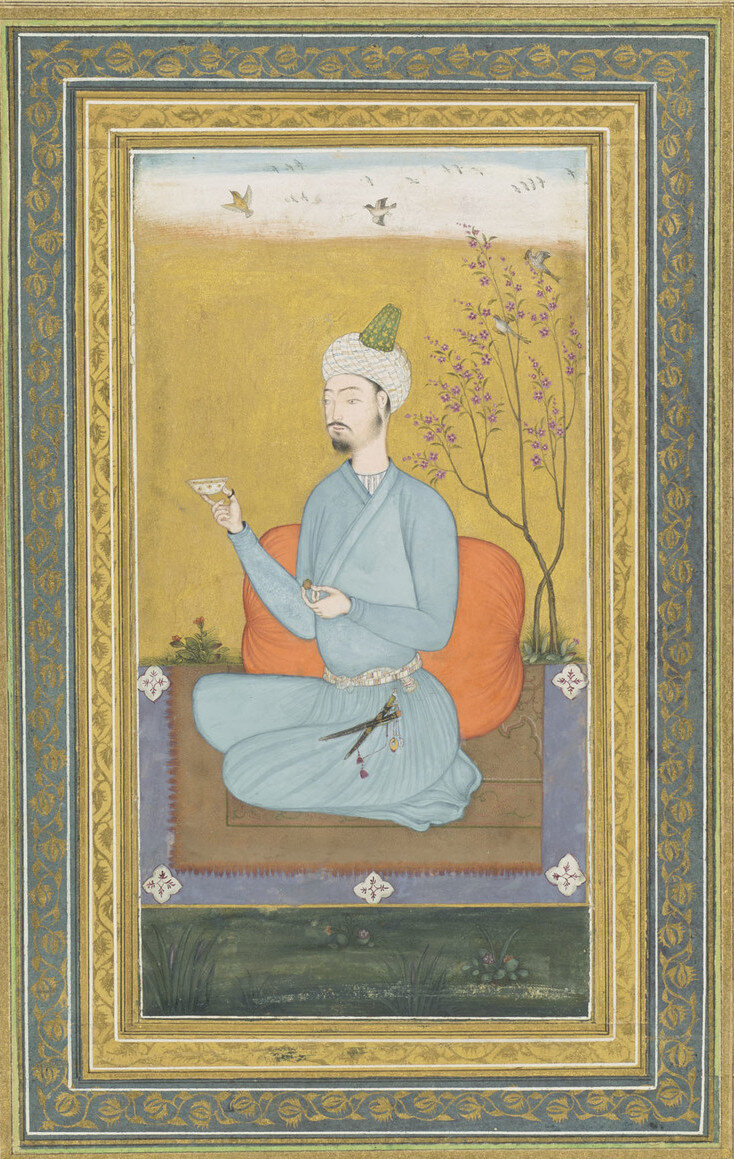
- Portrait of Kamran, c. 1600–1605

Mughal Ruler of Kabul and Kandahar
- Reign: 1531 – 1553
- Born: c. 1509; Kabul, Timurid Empire (present-day Afghanistan)
- Died: 16/18 October 1557 (aged 47–48); Makkah, Ottoman Empire (present-day Saudi Arabia)
- Spouse: Gulrukh Begum (m. 1528): Muhtarima Khanum; Hazara Begum; Mah Begum; Mihr Afroz Bega; Daulat Bakht Aghacha; Mah Chuchak Begum (m. 1546)
- Issue: Ibrahim Sultan Mirza; Habiba Sultan Begum; Hajji Begum; Aisha Sultan Begum; Gulizar Begum; Gulrukh Begum
Names
- Kamrangir Mirza ibn Mirza Zahir-ud-Din Muhammad Babur
- House: Mughal dynasty
- Dynasty: Timurid dynasty
- Father: Babur
- Mother: Gulrukh Begum
- Religion: Sunni Islam (Hanafi)

Kamran Mirza (Persian: کامران میرزا; c. 1509 – 16/18 October 1557) was the second son of Babur, the founder of the Mughal Empire and the first Mughal Emperor. Kamran Mirza was born in Kabul to Babur's wife Gulrukh Begum. He was half-brother to Babur's eldest son Humayun, who would go on and inherit the Mughal throne, but he was full-brother to Babur's third son, Askari. A divan written in Persian and Chagatai is attributed to him.

== Early life ==
Kamran Mirza was born around 1509 to Babur and Gulrukh Begum, a lady of the Begchik Mughals. Kamran spent his early childhood in Kabul, where Babur's household was based during the years before the conquest of India.

Kamran received the traditional Timurid aristocratic education, which included theology, Persian literature, history, calligraphy, martial arts, and equestrian skills. Babur personally oversaw the moral and intellectual formation of his sons. In 1522, he composed a didactic masnavi titled Dar-e-Fiqha Mubaiyan, commonly referred to as Mubin, containing approximately 2,000 verses in Persian. This work was written specifically for Kamran's instruction in Islamic law, reflecting Babur's ambition to raise a pious and principled ruler.

Babur also regularly sent him valuable books from his Indian conquests, including scholarly texts, commentaries, and poetic works, in an effort to cultivate Kamran's literary interests.

== Rise to power ==
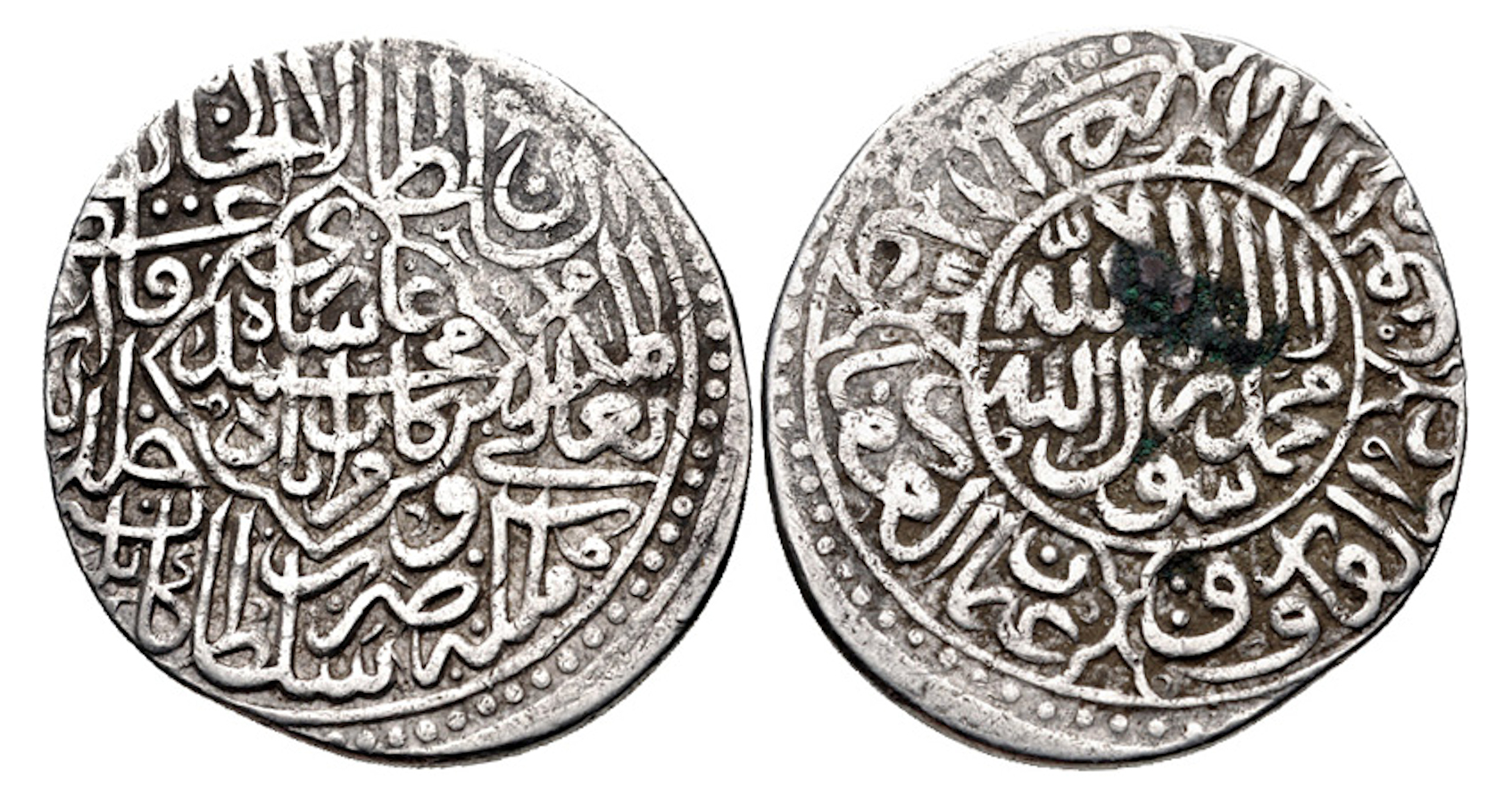
Coinage of Kamran Mirza. Kabul mint

Kamran was granted the governorship of Qandahar and Kabul in 1522. After Babur's death in 1530, the throne passed to Humayun, but Kamran retained his territories and began to expand his power independently. He marched into Punjab and took control of Lahore and Multan, two vital regions. This arrangement, rooted in the Timurid tradition of appanage governance, enabled Kamran to build his own military, court, and administration, parallel to the emperor's own. Initially, Humayun accepted this arrangement and even issued coins bearing both of their names, suggesting a joint rule or symbolic unity. However, Kamran soon began striking coins in his own name alone and assumed the royal title of Badshah, a clear assertion of sovereignty.

At first, Kamran provided limited support to Humayun in military campaigns, including the siege of Chunar in 1531. However, as his personal power grew, his cooperation waned. He increasingly pursued his own ambitions, often acting at cross-purposes with Humayun’s imperial policies. The relationship between the two brothers rapidly deteriorated during the 1540s, especially after the rise of Sher Shah Suri. During this critical period, Kamran refused to assist Humayun against Sher Shah, seeking instead to preserve his own territory and possibly claim the throne himself. Kamran assumed the title Padshah-i Ghazi, and a royal farman in the National Museum, New Delhi bears a seal dated 1539–40, with all references to Humayun omitted, indicating his assumption of sovereignty. After Humayun was defeated at the battle of Kannauj in 1540 and fled eastward, Kamran attempted to strike his own deals with Sher Shah, further isolating his brother.

== Conflict with Humayun ==
Following Humayun’s exile to Persia in 1543, Kamran emerged as the most powerful Mughal in the subcontinent. However, his own campaigns lacked coherence, and his attempts to take control of Delhi faltered. Meanwhile, Humayun, with Safavid assistance, returned to Kabul in 1545 and expelled Kamran from the city. Kamran briefly regained Kabul the following year, but was decisively defeated in successive battles. He also briefly reigned over Lahore and the surrounding territories as an independent ruler. His authority extended through key portions of the northwest subcontinent, though he never succeeded in establishing stable rule due to continuous infighting and local resistance. Over the next several years, Kamran made desperate attempts to regain territory and legitimacy. He allied with Afghan nobles, raised rebellions, and tried to resist Humayun's increasingly consolidated power, but without success.

== Capture and blinding ==
By 1553, after multiple defeats and betrayals, Kamran was captured by Ghakkar chieftains and handed over to Humayun. Humayun’s nobles demanded Kamran's execution, but Humayun—honoring Babur’s dying injunction not to harm his brothers—chose instead to have him blinded.

According to court chronicler Jauhar, Kamran endured the blinding with great fortitude, reciting prayers during the ordeal. His only request was that the executioners not press too hard on his knees.

== Exile and death ==
After being blinded, Kamran requested permission to go on pilgrimage to Mecca. Humayun granted the wish, and Kamran was exiled to the Hijaz, where he died on 16/18 October 1557.

== Personal life ==
=== Literary contributions ===
Apart from his political career, Kamran was a gifted poet who wrote extensively in Persian. His Diwan contains ghazals, rubaiyat, qata’at, and masnavis. He drew upon classical Persian poetic traditions and made skillful use of devices such as talmeeh (allusion), iste’ara (metaphor), tajnis (paronomasia), tashbih (simile), and eihaam (pun).

Kamran’s poetic themes revolve around mysticism, divine love, and reflections on political downfall. In many ghazals, he indirectly references betrayal and longing—possibly mirroring his own life experiences.

Two primary manuscripts of Kamran’s Diwan are preserved: one at the Khuda Bakhsh Oriental Library in Patna and another at the Raza Library in Rampur. Additional verses are found in literary anthologies such as Haft Iqlim, Makhzan-ul-Gharaib, Bayaz-ul-Ashaar, and Subh-e-Gulshan.

=== Architecture ===
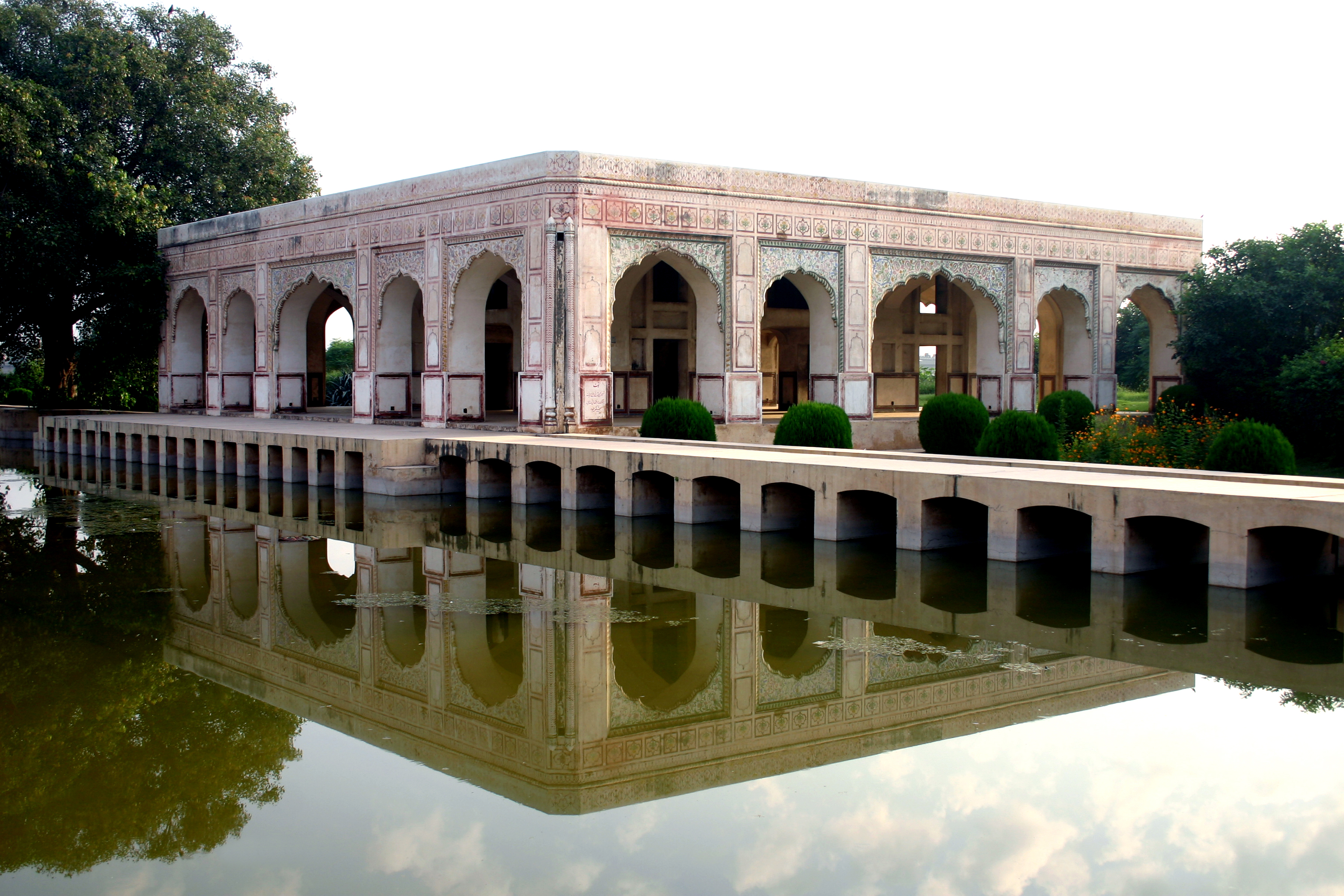
Kamran ki Baradari

A significant architectural structure built for Kamran exists today in Lahore. It is called Kamran ki Baradari. Bara means twelve and dar means doors. Kamran ki baradari was a twelve-door building on the bank of River Ravi. The river changed its course over time, with the result that the Baradari stands not on the bank but in the waters as an island while the gardens have deteriorated.

=== Family ===
Consorts

Kamran had seven wives:

- Gulrukh Begum (m. 1528), daughter of his maternal uncle, Amir Sultan Ali Mirza Taghai, a Begchik Mughal, and sister of Abdullah Khan Mughal;
- Muhtarima Khanum (died 1584), daughter of Shah Muhammad Sultan Jagatai, Sultan of Kashghar, by his wife, Khadija Sultan Khanum, fourth daughter of Sultan Ahmad Khan Jagatai;
- Hazara Begum, niece of the Hazara chief, Khizr Khan;
- Mah Begum, daughter of Sultan Wais, a Qibchaq Mughal, ruler of Kulab, and sister of Chakr Ali Beg, Haidar Beg and Haram Begum;
- Mihr Afroz Bega, mother of Hajji Begum;
- Daulat Bakht Aghacha, mother of Aisha Sultan Begum;
- Mah Chuchak Begum (m. 1546; d. 1558), daughter of Shah Husayn Arghun, ruler of Sindh, by his wife, Mah Chuchak Begum, daughter of Mirza Muhammad Muqim Beg Arghun;

Sons

Kamran had one son:

- Ibrahim Sultan (Abu'l-Qasim) Mirza (killed 1568);

Daughters

Kamran had five daughters:

- Habiba Sultan Begum, married in 1545 to Yasin Daulat Aq Sultan, son of Aiman Khwajah Sultan, son of Ahmad Alaq, the Khan of Moghulistan, divorced in 1551–52;
- Hajji Begum (died 1583) — with Mihr Afroz Bega, went on the pilgrimage to Mecca in October 1575;
- Aisha Sultan Begum — with Daulat Bakht Aghacha, went to Taloqan with her father in 1550. In 1551, she and her mother were in flight for Kandahar, but were captured at the Khimar Pass, and brought in by Humayun's people;
- Gulrukh Begum (died 1617), married to Ibrahim Husain Mirza, third son of Sultan Muhammad Mirza, of Azampur, sometime Governor of Sambhal. They had a son, Muzaffar Husain Mirza, who married Shahzada Khanum, daughter of emperor Akbar; and a daughter, Nur-un-Nissa Begum, who married the emperor Jahangir;
- Gulizar Begum, went on the pilgrimage to Mecca in October 1575;

== Notes ==
1. One of these daughters married Mirza Abdurrahman Beg, a Dughlat Mughal and nephew of Mirza Muhammad Haidar Dughlat, and the other married Fakhr-ud-Din Mashhadi, who died in 1578/79.

== Sources ==
- Baqa, Shabistan (2005). A Critical Edition of Diwan-e-Mirza Kamran (Persian Text) with Introduction and Notes (PDF) (PhD Thesis). Aligarh Muslim University.
- Begum, Gulbadan (1902). Humayun-nama: The history of Humayun. Translated by Annette S. Beveridge. Royal Asiatic Society.
- Faruqui, Munis D. (27 August 2012). The Princes of the Mughal Empire, 1504–1719. Cambridge University Press. ISBN 978-1-139-53675-2.
