= Hamida Banu Begum =

Padshah Begum of Mughal Empire (1527–1604)

- Empress consort of the Mughal Empire; Empress mother of the Mughal Empire
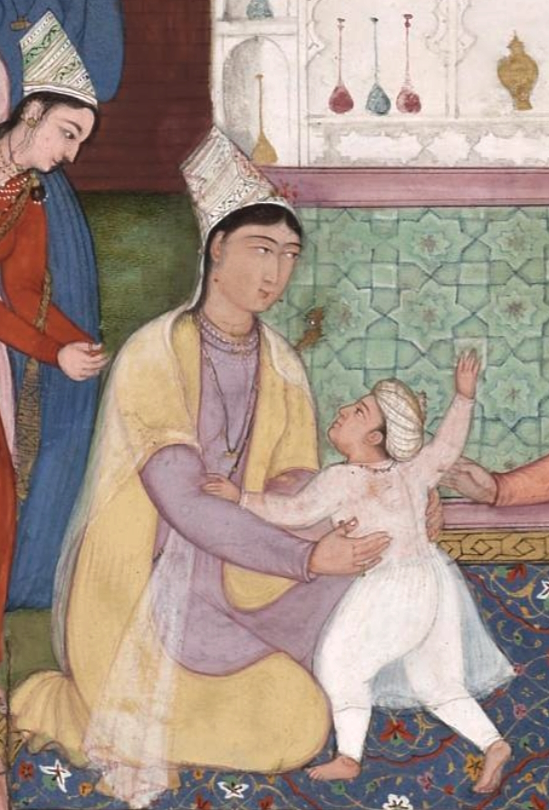
- Young Akbar Recognizes His Mother, from an Akbarnama (1596-1600)

Padshah Begum
- Tenure: 27 January 1556 - 29 August 1604
- Predecessor: Bega Begum
- Successor: Saliha Banu Begum

Empress mother of Mughal Empire
- Tenure: 11 February 1556 – 30 August 1604
- Predecessor: Maham Begum
- Successor: Mariam-uz-Zamani
- Born: c. 1527; Paat, Arghun dynasty (present-day Pakistan)
- Died: 29 August 1604 (aged 76–77); Agra, Mughal Empire (present-day India)
- Burial: 30 August 1604; Humayun's Tomb, Delhi
- Spouse: Humayun (m. 1541; d. 1556)
- Issue: Akbar; Two daughters
- Father: Shaikh Ali Akbar Jami
- Religion: Shia Islam
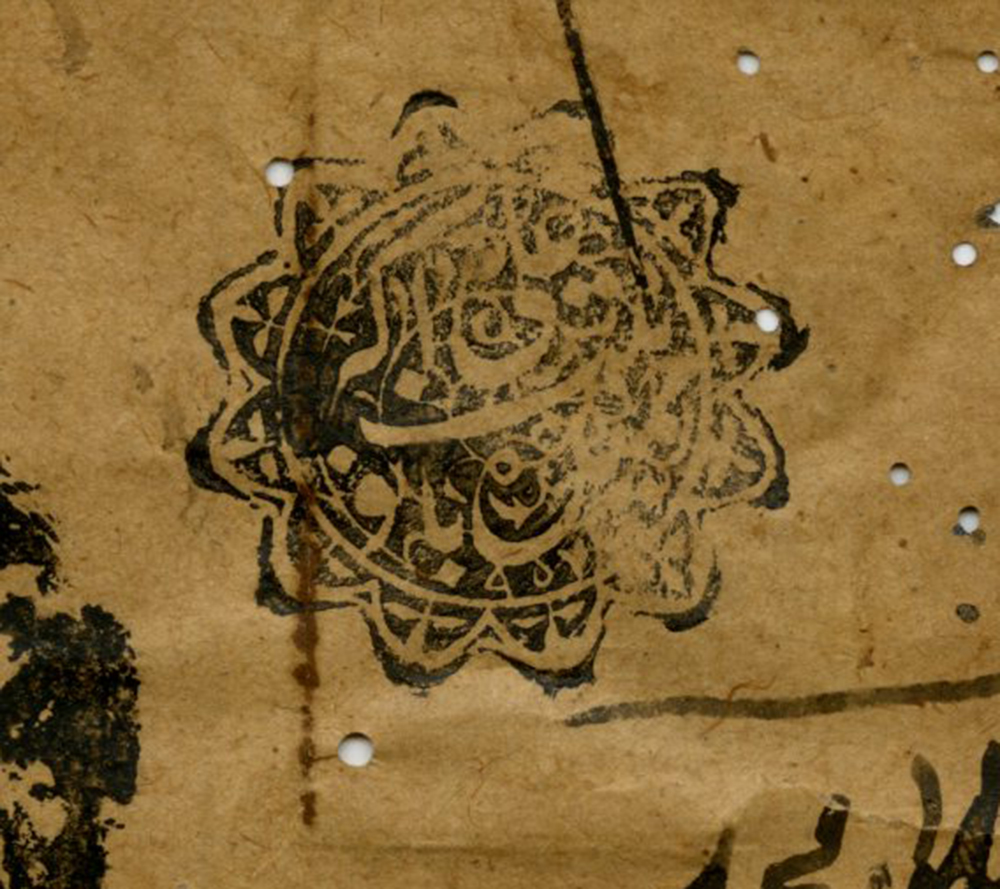
- Signature

Hamida Banu Begum (Persian: حمیده بانو بیگم; c. 1527 – 29 August 1604) was the empress consort of the second Mughal emperor Humayun and the mother of his successor, the third Mughal emperor Akbar. She was bestowed the title of Mariam Makani (lit. 'Dwelling with Mariam'), by her son, Akbar. She also bore the title of Padshah Begum during the reign of Akbar.

== Family ==
Hamida Banu Begum was born c. 1527 to a family of Persian descent. Her family was a prestigious pīr family long settled in the Sindh. Her father, Shaikh Ali Akbar Jami, a Shia, was a preceptor to Mughal prince Hindal Mirza, the youngest son of the first Mughal emperor, Babur. Ali Akbar Jami was also known as Mian Baba Dost, who belonged to the lineage of Ahmad Jami Zinda-fil. As suggested by her lineage, Hamida was a devout Muslim. She had a younger half-brother named Khwaja Muazzam. (Note: Khwaja Muazzam murdered his wife in 1564, for which Akbar had him imprisoned in Gwalior Fort. He died there a few years later.)

== Meeting with Humayun ==
She met Humayun, at the age of fourteen while visiting the household of Hindal Mirza during a banquet hosted by his mother, Dildar Begum, a widow of Babur and Humayun's stepmother, in Alwar. Humayun was then living in exile after being driven from Delhi by Sher Shah Suri, who sought to restore Afghan rule in Delhi.

When negotiations for Humayun's marriage with Hamida Banu Begum were going on, both Hamida and Hindal bitterly opposed the marriage proposal, possibly because they were involved with each other. It seems probable that Hamida was in love with Hindal, though there is only circumstantial evidence for it. In her book the Humayun-nama, Hindal's sister and Hamida's close friend, Gulbadan Begum, pointed out that Hamida was frequently seen in her brother's palace during those days, and even in the palace of their mother, Dildar Begum.

Initially, Hamida refused to meet the emperor; eventually after forty days of pursuit and at the insistence of Dildar Begum, she agreed to marry him. She refers to her initial reluctance in the Humayunama,

I shall marry someone; but he shall be a man whose collar my hand can touch, and not one whose skirt it does not reach.

== Marriage ==
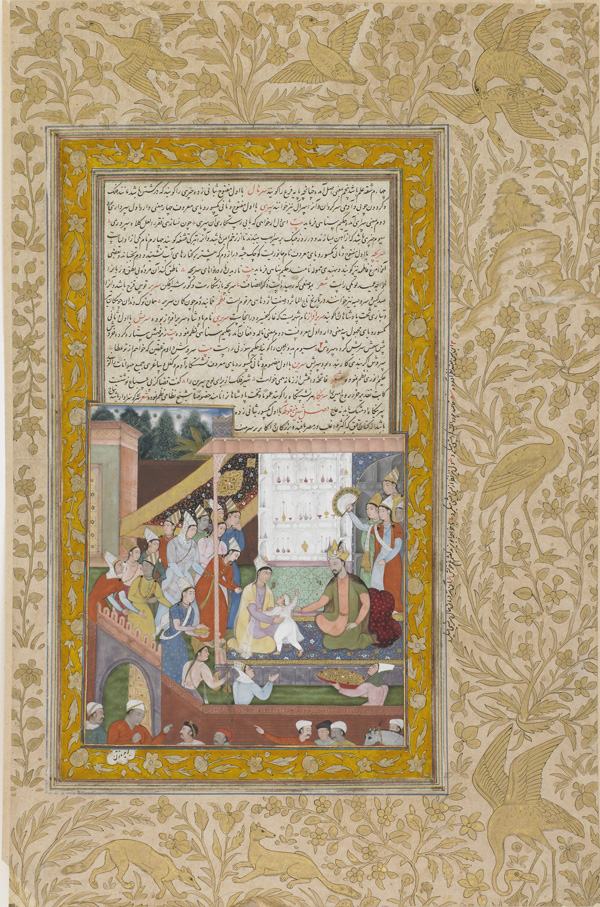
Young Akbar recognizes his mother. An illustration from the Akbarnama.

The marriage took place on a day chosen by the Emperor, an avid astrologer himself, employing his astrolabe, at mid-day on a Monday in September 1541 (Jumada al-awwal 948 AH) at Patr (known as Paat, Dadu District of Sindh). This was the town in which Hamida Banu Begum was born. It was in the very same town of Paat, many years ago, that Hamida’s parents Ali Akbar Jami and Mah Afroze Begum were also marriedThus, she became his junior wife, after Bega Begum (later known as Haji Begum, after Hajj), who was his first wife and chief consort. The marriage became "politically beneficial" to Humayun, as he got help from the rival Shia groups during times of war.

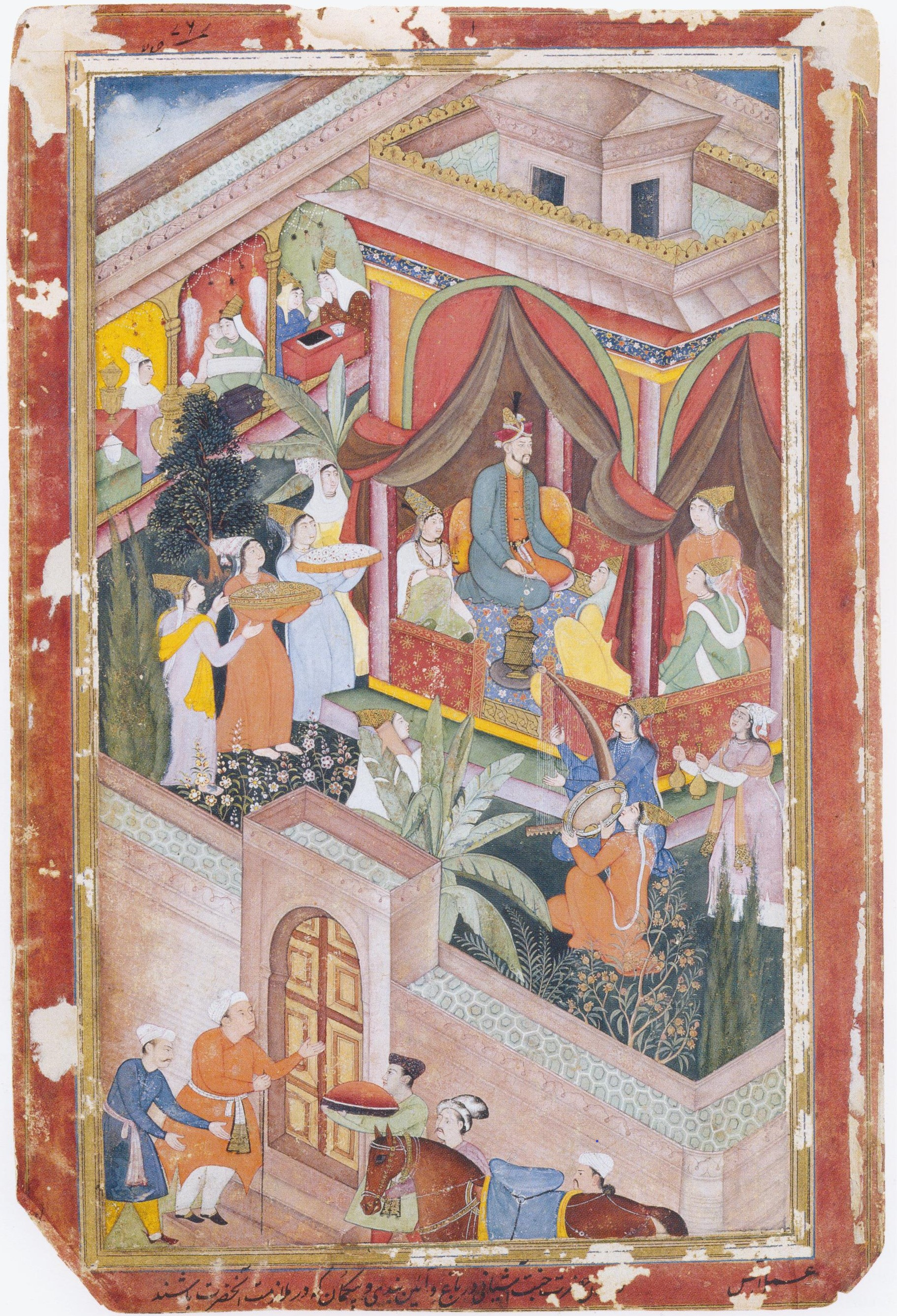
Wedding celebrations of Humayun and Hamida in 1541

A year after a perilous journey through the desert, on 22 August 1542, she and Emperor Humayun reached Umerkot ruled by Rana Prasad, a Hindu Sodha Rajput, at a small desert town, where the Rana gave them asylum. Two months later, she gave birth to the future Emperor, Akbar, early in the morning on 15 October 1542 (fourth day of Rajab, 949 AH); he was given the name Humayun had heard in his dream at Lahore – the Emperor Jalal-ud-din Muhammad Akbar.

In coming years, she took on numerous tough journeys to follow her husband, who was still in flight. First, in the beginning of the following December, she and her new born went into camp at Jūn, after traveling for ten or twelve days. Then in 1543, she made the perilous journey from Sindh, which had Qandahar for its goal, but in course of which Humayun had to take hasty flight from Shal-mastan, "through a desert and waterless waste". Leaving her little son behind, she accompanied her husband to Persia, here they visited the shrines of her ancestor, Ahmad-e Jami and Shiites shrine, of Ardabil in Iran, the place of origin of Safavid dynasty, which helped them immensely in the following years. In 1544, at a camp at Sabzawar, 93 miles south of Herat, she gave birth to two daughters, who died on the return journey from Persia. Thereafter, she returned from Persia with the army given to Humayun by Shah of Iran, Tahmasp I, and at Kandahar met Dildar Begum, and her son, Mirza Hindal. Thus it was not until 15 November 1545 (Ramdan 10th, 952 AH) that she saw her son Akbar again: the scene of young Akbar recognizing his mother amongst a group of women has been keenly illustrated in Akbar's biography, Akbarnama. In 1548, she and Akbar accompanied Humayun to Kabul.

== Akbar's reign ==
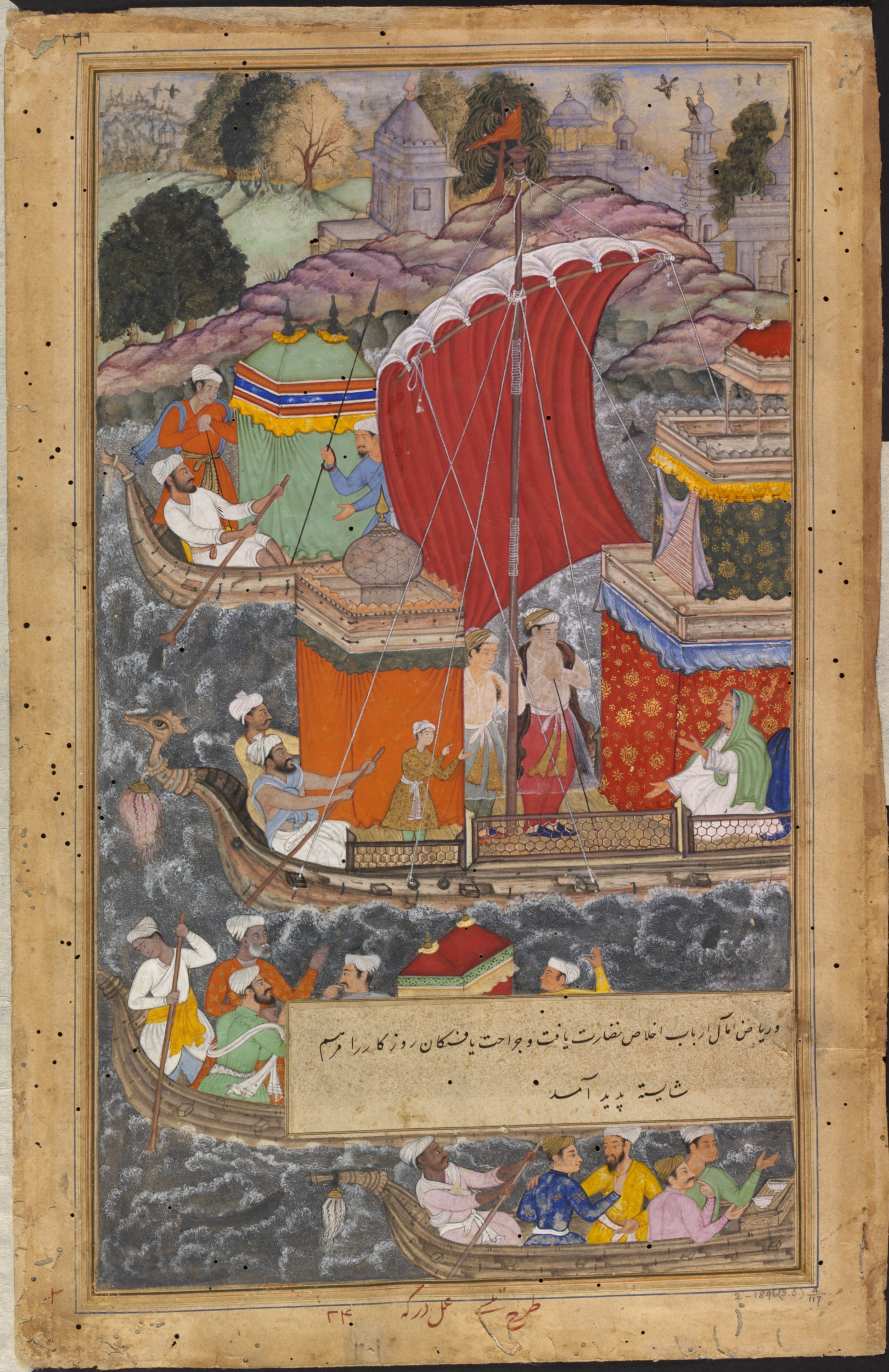
Akbar's mother travels by boat to Agra. An illustration from the Akbarnama.

During the reign of Akbar, there are many instances where imperial ladies interfered in matters of the court to ask pardon for a wrongdoer. She used her influence to secure a pardon for state offenders.

Meanwhile, Sher Shah Suri died in May 1545, and after that his son and successor, Islam Shah died too in 1554, disintegrating the Suri dynasty rule. In November 1554, when Humayun set out for India, she stayed back in Kabul. Though he took control of Delhi in 1555, he died within a year of his return, by falling down the steps of his library at Purana Qila, Delhi, in 1556 at the age of 47, leaving behind a thirteen-year-old heir, Akbar, who was to become one of greatest emperors of the empire. Hamida Banu joined Akbar from Kabul, only during his second year of reign, 1557 CE, and stayed with him thereafter, she even intervened in politics on various occasions, most notably during the ouster of Mughal minister, Bairam Khan, when Akbar came of age in 1560.

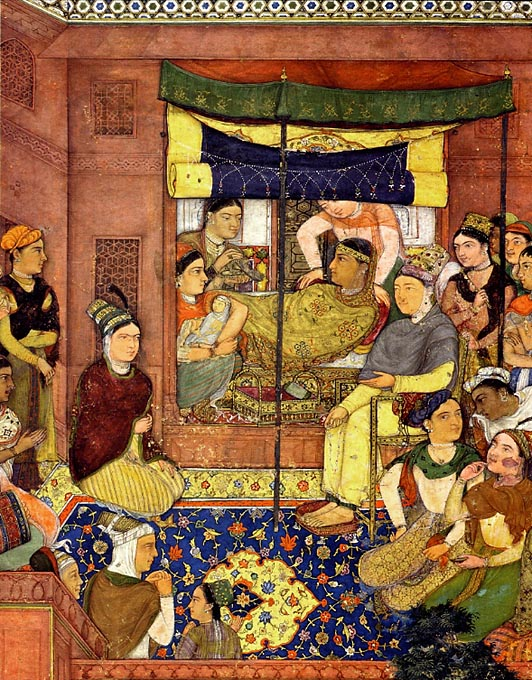
Painting from Jahangirnama describing the birth of prince Salim where Mariam Makani is seated beside Mariam-uz-Zamani, her daughter-in-law and mother of prince Salim.

In later years, she raised her granddaughter, Shahzada Khanam.

== Death and aftermath ==
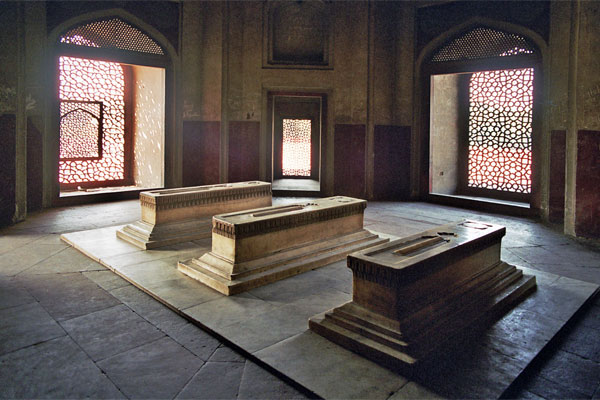
Cenotaph of Hamida Banu Begum along with that of Dara Shikoh and others, in a side chamber of Humayun's Tomb, Delhi.

She was buried at Humayun's Tomb after her death on 29 August 1604 (19th Shahriyar, 1013 AH) in Agra, just a year before the death of her son Akbar and almost half a century after death of her husband, Humayun. Throughout her years, she was held in high regard by her son Akbar, as English traveler Thomas Coryat recorded, Akbar carrying her palanquin himself across the river, during one of her journeys from Lahore to Agra. Later when Prince Salim, future emperor Jahangir, revolted against his father Akbar, she took upon the case of her grandson, and a reconciliation ensued thereafter, even though Salim had plotted and got Akbar's favorite minister Abu'l-Fazl killed. Akbar shaved his head and chin only on two occasions, one at the death of foster-mother Jiji Anga and another at the death of his mother.

She was given the title, Maryam-makānī, dwelling with Mary as she was considered, 'epitome of innocence' by Akbar. She has been referred to as "Hazrat" in court chronicles of her son, Akbar and her grandson, Jahangir. Details of her life are also found in Humayun Nama, written by Gulbadan Begum, sister of Humayun, as well as in Akbarnama and Ain-i-Akbari, both written during the reign of her son, Akbar.

== In popular culture ==
=== Films and television ===
- She is portrayed by Nargis in the 1945 Indian epic film Humayun.
- In Jodhaa Akbar, a 2008 Indian epic film, directed by Ashutosh Gowariker, the character of Hamida Bano was portrayed by Poonam Sinha.
- From 18 June 2013, Zee TV started airing a TV series titled Jodha Akbar with Rajat Tokas and Paridhi Sharma in the lead. Hamida Banu Begum is portrayed as a main character and is played by Chhaya Phadkar.
- Rishina Kandhari portrayed Hamida Banu Begum in the 2017 Indian television series Akbar Rakht Se Takht Ka Safar.
- Aruna Irani portrayed Salima in Colors TV's 2018 fictional drama Daastan-E-Mohabbat Salim Anarkali.
