= The Empire (Indian TV series) =

Indian period drama web series

- Promotional poster
- Genre: Drama; Historical fiction
- Created by: Nikkhil Advani
- Based on: Empire of the Moghul by Alex Rutherford
- Screenplay by: Bhavani Iyer; Mitakshara Kumar; Dialogues; A M Turaz; Mitakshara Kumar
- Directed by: Mitakshara Kumar
- Starring: Shabana Azmi; Kunal Kapoor; Drashti Dhami; Dino Morea; Aditya Seal; Sahher Bambba; Rahul Dev
- Composers: Music; Shail Hada; Background Score; Ashutosh Phatak
- Country of origin: India
- Original language: Hindi
- No. of seasons: 1
- No. of episodes: 8

Production
- Producers: Monisha Advani; Madhu Bhojwani
- Cinematography: Nigam Bomzan
- Editors: Atanu Mukherjee; Sagar Manik
- Production company: Emmay Entertainment

Original release
- Network: Disney+ Hotstar
- Release: 27 August 2021

The Empire is an Indian period drama television series created by Nikkhil Advani and directed by Mitakshara Kumar based on the novel series Empire of the Moghul by Alex Rutherford for Disney+ Hotstar. The series was premiered on Disney+ Hotstar on 27 August 2021.

The first season of the series opened generally favourable reviews with praise for the show's visuals, sets, costumes and the performance of the main cast, with a positive consensus on Shabana Azmi's portrayal of Ësan Dawlat and criticism for poor VFX in a few scenes.

== Premise ==
The series depicts upon the fall of the Timurid Empire and the rise of the Mughal Empire, starting from Babur. The story begins from Farghana where the young prince Babur is crowned as emperor at a young age after the death of his father, Umar Sheikh. His grandmother Aisan Daulat Begum guides him in his rule. He begins his campaign for the conquest of North India through hardships, betrayals and struggles amongst his court members. He was then defeated by Muhammad Shaybani Khan, and as a part of a deal to save their life, his elder sister, Khanzada had to marry Shaybani. She then falls in love with Shaybani, but she ultimately chooses her brother over him, tricks him and becomes a cause of his death.

Babur then travels to Hindustan, defeats Ibrahim Khan Lodi in the Battle of Panipat, and establishes the Mughal Dynasty. Amongst his wives' battle for the heir to the imperial throne, Babur finally selects Humayun as his successor.

== Cast ==
- Shabana Azmi as Aisan Daulat Begum / "Shah" Begum
- Kunal Kapoor as Babur
  - Mehroos Mir as Young Babur
- Dino Morea as Muhammad Shaybani
- Drashti Dhami as Khanzada Begum
  - Gracy Goswami as Young Khanzada Begum
- Aditya Seal as Humayun
- Sahher Bambba as Maham Begum
- Rahul Dev as Wazir Khan
- Khalid Siddiqui as Umar Shaikh Mirza II
- Imaad Shah as Qasim
- Gireesh Sahdev as Baisanghar
- Charu Shankar as Qutlugh Nigar Khanum
- Aayam Mehta as Aitbaar
- Toranj Kayvon as Gulrukh Begum
- Swattee Thakur as Nishqa
- Kalliroi Tzaifeta as Roxanna
- Akansha Sareen as Razia
- Megha Kaul as Dildar Begum
- Salina Prakash as Aq Quzi Begum
- Madhuri Pandey as Nusrat
- Naved Aslam as Qambar Ali
- Karan Pandit as Kamran Mirza
- Anuj Singh Duhan as Aslam Nawaz
- Digvijay Purohit as Zulfikar Anwar
- Akshay Nagori as Jibran

== Episodes ==
No.	Title	Directed by	Written by	Original release date
1	"Not the King but the Kingmaker"	Mitakshara Kumar	Screenplay; Bhavani Iyer; Mitakshara Kumar; Dialogues; A M Turaz; Mitakshara Kumar; Sanjay Bhardwaj "Lankesh"	August 27, 2021
After King of Ferghana Umar Shaikh's death, young Babur assumes responsibility for an entire kingdom while scheming vultures outside and inside Ferghana's walls circle the throne.
2	"The Panther's Prowl"	Mitakshara Kumar	Screenplay; Bhavani Iyer; Mitakshara Kumar; Dialogues; A M Turaz; Mitakshara Kumar; Sanjay Bhardwaj "Lankesh"	August 27, 2021
Ferghana has fallen under Shaibani Khan who imprisons Esan, Khanzada and Kutlugh. Back in Samarkand, its impregnability dawns on Babur, but a street boy may be able to help him.
3	"The Separation"	Mitakshara Kumar	Screenplay; Bhavani Iyer; Mitakshara Kumar; Dialogues; A M Turaz; Mitakshara Kumar	August 27, 2021
4	"Alliances"	Mitakshara Kumar	Screenplay; Bhavani Iyer; Mitakshara Kumar; Dialogues; A M Turaz; Mitakshara Kumar	August 27, 2021
5	"The Roar of the Lion"	Mitakshara Kumar	Screenplay; Bhavani Iyer; Mitakshara Kumar; Dialogues; A M Turaz; Mitakshara Kumar	August 27, 2021
6	"Requiem"	Mitakshara Kumar	Screenplay; Bhavani Iyer; Mitakshara Kumar; Dialogues; A M Turaz; Mitakshara Kumar	August 27, 2021
7	"Panipat"	Mitakshara Kumar	Screenplay; Bhavani Iyer; Mitakshara Kumar; Dialogues; A M Turaz; Mitakshara Kumar	August 27, 2021
8	"The Beginning"	Mitakshara Kumar	Screenplay; Bhavani Iyer; Mitakshara Kumar; Dialogues; A M Turaz; Mitakshara Kumar	August 27, 2021

== Production ==
=== Development ===
Nikhil Advani accepted the idea of creating the show being brought up by Star India. Bhavani Iyer was initially tapped to write the screenplay for the digital adaptation on the show, with A. M. Turaz penning the dialogue. The show focuses on Babur for the first season.

Speaking about the series with Scroll.in, Advani said, “What we know about the Mughal Empire is its men, but the highlight of the series is the active role women played in the backroom politics and manipulations [...] Women had the remote controls.”

=== Casting ===
Ronit Roy, Dia Mirza and Shabana Azmi were initially cast in the lead roles (in September 2018). However, Ronit and Dia left the series for unknown reasons, and they were replaced by Kunal Kapoor and Drashti Dhami respectively. Rahul Dev was confirmed to be part of the cast in July 2020.

=== Filming ===
Principal photography took place in Jaipur in February 2020. The shoot was suspended due to the COVID-19 pandemic in March 2020, and it was later resumed after the lockdown in September 2020. After shooting a large portion on sets, the filming was moved to Wai, Maharashtra to recreate wilderness scene. A huge set for Uzbekistan was recreated in Mumbai.

== Release ==
The series premiered on Disney+ Hotstar on 27 August 2021.

=== Promotion ===
The first teaser was released in July 2021 by Disney+ Hotstar and the trailer was released in August 2021.

== Reception ==
Saraswati Datar of The News Minute welcomed the series by writing that "The Empire is an ambitious and sincere attempt to tackle a brand-new genre in the Indian OTT space, and it prompted me to go find out more about Babur than what textbooks had taught us."

Lehren's Bharathi Pradhan praised the performances of actors Shabana Azmi, Rahul Dev, Drashti Dhami, Kunal Kapoor and Dino Morea and added "when Babur's sister, well played by Drashti (Dhami), adds her bit to the tome titled ‘Baburnama,’ you know history is always part fiction. Take it with a pinch of salt." In a similar review, Shubham Kulkarni of Koimoi wrote "The Empire is a huge step in creating extravagant shows for the Indian OTT. There is everything a period drama lover craves for. Go in and get to witness the saga that talks about love, war and betrayal. But [...] watch it with the word ‘fiction’ in your mind. It doesn’t intend to educate you.

Writing for Film Companion, Rahul Desai called The Empire “a weak cocktail of fact and fiction”. He criticised the “diplomatic identity” and “free fictionalization” of the Mughal story. Rohan Nahaar of Hindustan Times wrote that “a potentially engaging story of palace intrigue is wasted in Disney+ Hotstar's consistently dull adaptation of Alex Rutherford's Mughal era novels.”

Sampada Sharma of The Indian Express wrote that the show "excels in the aesthetic department. From the intricately crafted sets, to the beautifully designed costumes, the show leaves you in awe but what it gains in aesthetics, it loses out in VFX." Additionally, Sharma criticised the length of the series but praised the performance of the cast by writing that "The Empire’s eight episodes feel a little too long, especially in places where there is song-and-dance. [...] Shabana Azmi has an aura about her that that evokes respect for her character. It is evident that a character like hers often wonders why she lives in a patriarchal world when clearly she is the smartest one around. Later in the series, Drashti Dhami’s Khanzada tries to take her legacy ahead."

Pradeep Menon of Firstpost appreciated the look and feel of the series writing that “the makers of The Empire deserve to be rewarded for the scale and the feel, with the chance to follow up with future seasons. But they desperately need to get their act together in terms of writing and casting.”

Vibha Maru of India Today praised the performance of the lead cast, saying that “Kunal Kapoor and Shabana Azmi rule this historical drama”.

Shefali Deshpande of The Quint wrote that "The Empire is an engaging story of family & the casualty that is war, The first thing that hits you is the breathtaking visuals. Barring the sometimes tacky VFX of the palaces, castles and buildings, the actual sets and some special effects are beautiful."

Appreciating the series, Shilajit Mitra of The New Indian Express wrote "In the Indian arena, The Empire beats out its contemporaries in scale and ambition. Some of the exterior shots and battlefield vistas are stunning to behold. [...] The action, too, is smoothly choreographed and rendered. I’ll look out for Season 2, just to see how they scale up from here. The Empire has found its feet."

Anuj Kumar of The Hindu appreciated the performances of the cast, the aesthetics and the series, in general, but opined that it skipped numerous significant historical events by writing that "we get to see the First Battle of Panipat, but the equally important Battle of Khanwa is glossed over. Similarly, for an emperor who grew up listening to multicultural poetry of Amir Khusro, his interaction with his new subjects, particularly the Sikhs, remain untouched [...] Babur’s bond with the new land and its rich flora and fauna — something he has written about extensively — remains out of the script. His love for opium and music has been airbrushed [...] how Babur crossed the mighty rivers curiously remains out of the canvas."

Hindu nationalist users on the Internet criticized the web series for glorifying Mughals, causing a grievance complaint to be filed against the web series. The grievance officer appointed under Information Technology (Guidelines for intermediaries and Digital Media Ethics Code) Rules 2021 received complaints against the web series., but he rejected those claims. Addressing this controversy, Nikkhil Advani told IANS:

"For me, the force field in this case has been the book. I am following the book. If you have an objection you need to understand that as a maker and storyteller I have been fascinated by the book and by the story they have told in the book"
