= Masuma Sultan Begum =

- Timurid princess Queen consort of the Ferghana Valley; Queen consort of the Samarkand
- Died: c. 1508; Kabul, Afghanistan
- Spouse: Babur (m. 1507)
- Issue: Masuma Sultan Begum
- House: Timurid (by birth)
- Father: Sultan Ahmed Mirza
- Mother: Habiba Sultan Begum
- Religion: Islam

Masuma Sultan Begum (d. c. 1508) was the Queen consort of Ferghana Valley and Samarkand as the fourth wife of Emperor Babur, the founder of the Mughal Empire and the first Mughal emperor.

Masuma was a first cousin of her husband and a Timurid princess by birth. She was the fifth and youngest daughter of Babur's paternal uncle, Sultan Ahmed Mirza, the King of Samarkand and Bukhara.

== Family and lineage ==
Masuma Sultan Begum was born a Timurid princess as the fifth and youngest daughter of Sultan Ahmed Mirza, the King of Samarkand and Bukhara, and his fifth wife Habiba Sultan Begum, niece of Sultan Husain Aghun. She had four elder half-sisters, among whom one, Aisha Begum, was a former wife of her husband Babur, and two more became her sisters-in-law.

She was the step-daughter of Mihr Nigar Khanum, sister of Babur's mother Qutlugh Nigar Khanum. She was also the half sister of Aisha Begum, the first wife of Babur, whom he later divorced, under the influence of their eldest sister Rabia Sultan Begum.

Her father was the eldest son and successor of Abu Sa'id Mirza, the Emperor of the Timurid Empire. Masuma's paternal uncles included Umar Sheikh Mirza, the ruler of Ferghana Valley, who later became her father-in-law as well while her first cousins included her future husband, Babur, and his elder sister, Khanzada Begum.

== Marriage ==
Following Babur's loss of Samarkand and Andijan, Habiba Sultan Begum, Masuma'a mother, brought Masuma to Herat. One day when Babur was visiting an elder relative on his expedition to Khosran, Masuma came there with her mother. Masuma fell in love with him. As Babur tells it, "At once I felt a rising in her great inclination towards me." Babur asked her hand in marriage. After an exchange of private messages, Babur's elder relative and Payanda Sultan Begum (wife of Sultan Husayn Mirza Bayqara) settled with Habiba Sultan Begum that the latter should bring her daughter to Kabul for Babur. Babur then moved to Kabul where he married her in 1507.

== Death ==
A year after her marriage she gave birth to a girl, at the time of whose birth she was taken ill, and died. Her daughter was given her name.
