= Fakhr-un-Nissa =

- Shahzadi of the Mughal Empire
- Born: 1501; Samarkand, Uzbekistan
- Died: 1501 (aged -1–0); Samarkand, Uzbekistan
- Burial: Gardens of Babur, Kabul, Afghanistan
- Dynasty: Timurid
- Father: Babur
- Mother: Aisha Sultan Begum
- Religion: Sunni Islam

Fakhr-un-Nissa (died 1501) was a Mughal princess as the eldest child of the first Mughal Emperor Babur and his Empress consort Aisha Sultan Begum.

Fakhr-un-Nissa was born in 1501 in Samarkand to the nineteen-year-old Babur and his first wife, Aisha Sultan Begum. Upon her birth, she was named Fakhr-un-Nissa ("Glory of Women"). The princess died a month or forty days after her birth, and her death grieved Babur the most as he dearly loved his daughter.

== Ancestry ==
Ancestors of Fakhr-un-Nissa

8. Abu Sa'id Mirza, Timurid Sultan (= 12)
4. Umar Shaikh Mirza II, King of Ferghana
9. Shah Sultan Begum
2. Zahir-ud-din Muhammad Babur, Mughal Emperor
10. Yunus Khan, Khan of Moghulistan
5. Qutlugh Nigar Khanum
11. Aisan Daulat Begum
1. Fakhr-un-Nissa
12. Abu Sa'id Mirza, Timurid Sultan (= 8)
6. Ahmad Mirza, Sultan of Samarqand and Bukhara
13. Daughter of Aurdu Bugha Tarkhan
3. Aisha Sultan Begum
Qataq Begum
