= Masuma Sultan Begum (daughter of Babur) =

- Shahdokht of Mughal Empire
- Born: c. 1508; Kabul (present-day Afghanistan)
- Spouse: Muhammad Zaman Mirza (m. 1517; d. 1539)
- House: Timurid
- Father: Babur
- Mother: Masuma Sultan Begum
- Religion: Sunni Islam

Masuma Sultan Begum (Persian: معصومه سلطان بیگم; born c. 1508) was a Mughal princess and the daughter of the first Mughal emperor, Babur. She is frequently mentioned in the Humayun-nama by her sister, Gulbadan Begum, who calls her sister 'Elder sister Moon' (mah chacha).

== Early life ==
Masuma Sultan Begum was the daughter of Babur and his fourth wife, also named Masuma Sultan Begum. Born in Kabul, she was named after her mother who died giving birth to her. In 1511, Babur entrusted Kabul to his younger brother Nasir Mirza and set out for Samarkand.

== Marriage ==
In 1517, when Masuma Sultan Begum was nine years old, Babur married her to the twenty-one year old Muhammad Zaman Mirza. He was the son of Badi' al-Zaman Mirza, and the grandson of Sultan Husayn Mirza Bayqara. His mother was the daughter of Tahamtan Beg, and the niece of Asad Beg. After Masuma Sultan Begum's marriage with him, Babur sent him to Balkh.

She became a widow at the age of thirty-one when Muhammad Zaman Mirza died in the Battle of Chausa, fighting for the Mughals against the Afghan ruler, Sher Shah Suri.

== Ancestry ==
Ancestors of Masuma Sultan Begum (daughter of Babur)

8. Abu Sa'id Mirza, Timurid Sultan (= 12)
4. Umar Shaikh Mirza II, King of Ferghana
9. Shah Sultan Begum
2. Zahir-ud-din Muhammad Babur, Mughal Emperor
10. Yunus Khan, Khan of Moghulistan
5. Qutlugh Nigar Khanum
11. Aisan Daulat Begum
1. Masuma Sultan Begum
12. Abu Sa'id Mirza, Timurid Sultan (= 8)
6. Ahmad Mirza, Sultan of Samarqand and Bukhara
13. Daughter of Aurdu Bugha Tarkhan
3. Masuma Sultan Begum
14. Brother of Sultan Husain Arghun
Habiba Sultan Begum
