= Aisha Sultan Begum =

- Timurid princess Queen consort of the Ferghana Valley; Queen consort of the Samarkand; Zan-i-Kalan
- Spouse: Babur (m. 1499; div. 1503)
- Issue: Fakhr-un-Nissa
- House: Timurid (by birth)
- Father: Sultan Ahmed Mirza
- Mother: Qutaq Begum
- Religion: Islam

Aisha Sultan Begum (Persian: عائشه سلطان بیگم) was Queen consort of Ferghana Valley and Samarkand as the first wife of Emperor Babur, the founder of the Mughal Empire and the first Mughal emperor.

Aisha was a first cousin of her husband and was a Timurid princess by birth. She was the daughter of Babur's paternal uncle, Sultan Ahmed Mirza, the King of Samarkand and Bukhara.

== Family and lineage ==
Aisha Sultan Begum was born a Timurid princess and was the third daughter of Sultan Ahmed Mirza (the King of Samarkand and Bukhara) and his wife Qutaq Begum. She was named 'Aisha' after Prophet Muhammad's wife, ‘Ā’ishah bint Abī Bakr.

Her father, Sultan Ahmed Mirza, was the eldest son and successor of Abu Sa'id Mirza, the Emperor of the Timurid Empire. Aisha's paternal uncles included Umar Sheikh Mirza, the ruler of Ferghana Valley, who later became her father-in-law as well. His children, Babur (her future husband), and his elder sister, Khanzada Begum, were thus, Aisha's first cousins.

== Marriage ==
In her infancy, Aisha was betrothed to her double first cousin, Babur, the son of Umar Sheikh Mirza and her aunt, Qutlugh Nigar Khanum. Their fathers were brothers and one of Ahmed's wives was Mihr Khanum, sister of Qutlugh. The engagement happened in 1488 in Samarkand, Uzbekistan, when Babur himself was only five years old. Aisha married Babur eleven years later in August 1499 at Khojand and subsequently joined him in Ferghana, where Babur had succeeded upon the death of his father as ruler of the valley of Ferghana.

The young queen found her husband a bashful, if not reluctant lover. Babur remained very shy of her in the beginning of their marriage and went to see her only once in ten or fifteen days. As Babur tells it, "Though I was not ill-disposed towards her [Aisha], yet, this being my first marriage, out of modesty and bashfulness, I used to see her once in ten, fifteen, twenty days." He soon bored even of this, and discontinued his visits altogether. Thereafter, Aisha's aunt and mother-in-law, Qutlugh Nigar Khanum, used to scold him with great fury ("many dunnings" as he says in his autobiography, translated by Annette Beveridge) and send him to visit her every few days. Babur was simply not interested in her, or in marriage, at this time. Aisha gave birth to Babur's first child after three years of marriage. This was a daughter, Fakhr-un-Nissa, born in 1501 at Samarkand but died after a month or forty days. Her death grieved Babur the most as he had grown dearly fond of his little daughter.

== Divorce ==
Though their relationship was much closer now, it seems that Aisha and Babur quarrelled and she left him before the overthrow of Tashkent in 1503. Babur states that his wife was misled by the machinations of her elder sister, Rabia Sultan Begum, who induced her to leave his house.
