= Battle of the Chirciq River =

- Part of Timurid-Moghul Wars
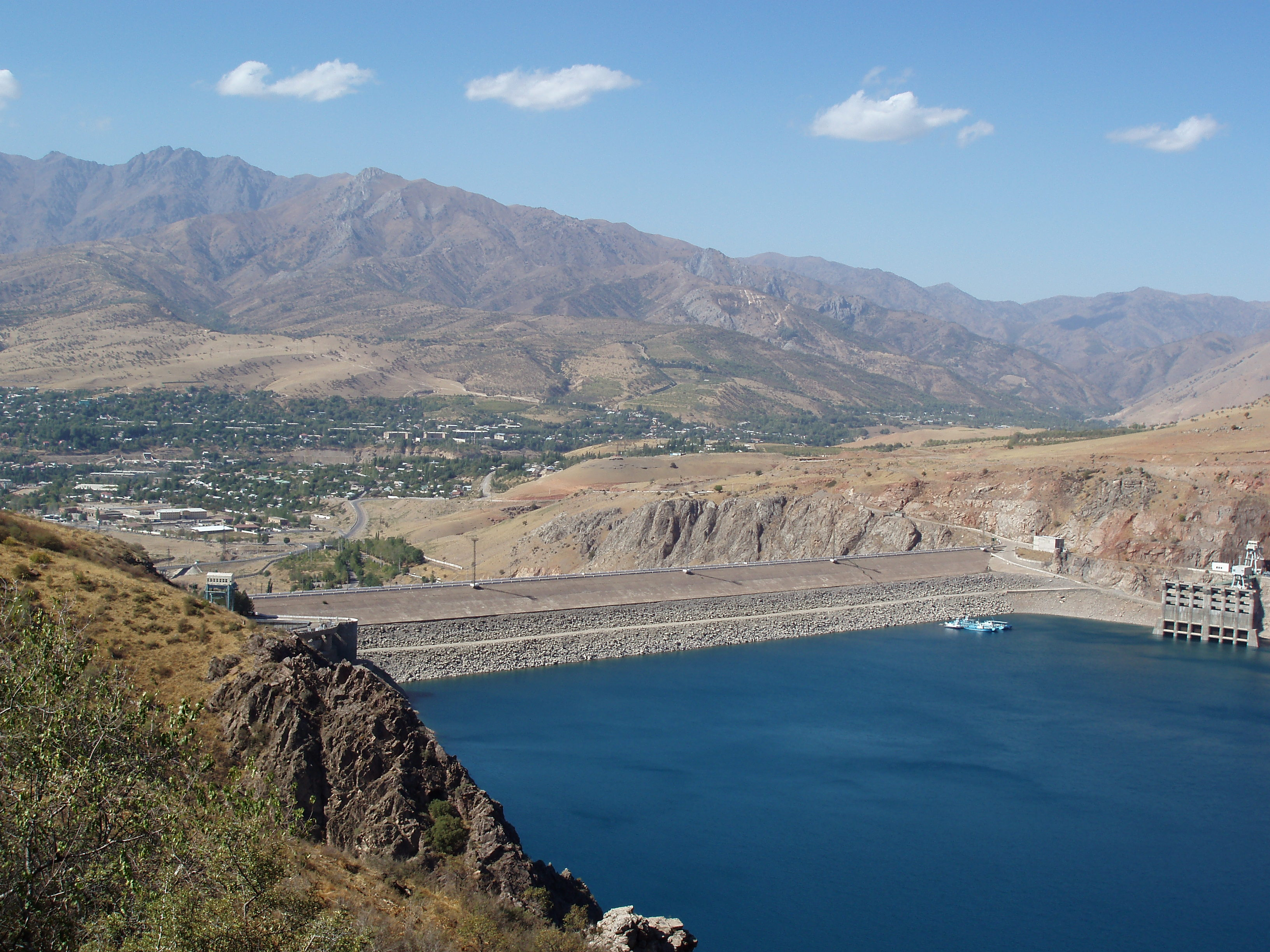
- modern day view of the dammed Chirciq River
Date	1488
Location	Chirciq River South East of Tashkent, Uzbekistan
Result	Decisive Moghul victory

Belligerents
(Chagatai Khanate) Chagatai Moghuls of Moghulistan	Timurids of Samarkand & Bukhara

Commanders and leaders
Sultan Mahmud Khan; Muhammad Shaybani Khan (defector)	Sultan Ahmed Mirza; Mir Abdul Ali Tarkhan; Muhammad Majid Tarkhan

The Battle of the Chirciq River was fought between Sultan Mahmud Khan of Moghulistan and Sultan Ahmed Mirza, the Timurid ruler of Samarkand & Bukhara in 1488 CE over the city of Tashkent. The Moghuls decisively defeated the Timurids as a result of the defection of 3,000 Uzbeks under the command of Muhammad Shaybani Khan.

== Background ==
Tashkent was conquered by Yunus Khan, the Khan of Moghulistan during the Timurid Civil Wars. After he died in 1487 CE, his son Sultan Mahmud Khan became the new Khan. With this change of power in Tashkent, the Timurids of Ferghana ordered by Umar Shaikh Mirza II decided to attack Tashkent and placed a strong army in the Ushtar Fort. However, Sultan Mahmud Khan marched quickly to besiege the fort and took it by assault. Next year, however, the Amirs of the Timurids of Samarkand & Bukhara compelled and convinced Sultan Ahmed Mirza to attack the Moghuls and take Tashkent, otherwise they will be a source of trouble for the region and its trade. Finally, the Mirza collected an army 150,000 strong, and led it against Tashkent.

== Battle ==
Sultan Mahmud Khan passed through the suburbs of Tashkent and stood facing the advancing Timurids. Between them flowed the Chirciq River which it was impossible to cross. The armies remained there for the next three days. In the army of the Mirza was Muhammad Shaybani Khan, the son of Shah Budagh Oghlan, the son of Abul-Khayr Khan ibn Dawlat Shaykh ibn Ibrahim Khan. Muhammad Shaybani Khan was not able to hold his own in the steppes, he betook himself to Transoxiana, and became a retainer of one of Sultan Ahmed Mirza's Amirs named Mir Abdul Ali. He was in this army, and had 3000 followers. When Sultan Ahmed Mirza had remained three days on the bank of the river, Muhammad Shaybani Khan sent to Sultan Mahmud Khan a message to ask if he would meet and confer with him. That same night they met and they agreed that on the morrow the Khan should attack Mir Abdul Ali, the master of Muhammad Shaybani Khan, who, on his part, undertook to throw the army into disorder, and then to take flight.

On the next day the Moghul army was drawn up in battle array, and the infantry passed the river; the cavalry also entered the stream, when the infantry of the Timurids began the battle. The Moghul army directed its force against Mir Abdul Ali. At this moment Muhammad Shaybani Khan turned and fled with his 3000 Uzbeks, and throwing himself on the baggage of the army, began to plunder. In fact, wherever this disordered rabble found themselves, their device was to fall upon the baggage, so that the army of Sultan Ahmed Mirza was put to flight. But since the Chirciq River, which the people of Tashkent at that time called Parak, was in front of them, most of his soldiers were drowned in it. The troops of Sultan Ahmed Mirza suffered a severe defeat, while he, discomfited and beaten, fled to Samarkand. Peace was again arranged between the Khan and Sultan Ahmed Mirza.

== Aftermath ==
This victory did much to raise Sultan Mahmud Khan in the estimation of the surrounding Sultans, who henceforward stood in great fear of him, and thus his position became secure. Sultan Mahmud Khan seized and threw into prison Muhammad Majid Tarkhan, who had been appointed Governor of Turkistan by Sultan Ahmed Mirza; and this Muhammad Majid Tarkhan was one of the principal causes of the peace, for he was a relation, on the mother's side, of Sultan Ahmed Mirza. As a reward for the services Muhammad Shaybani Khan rendered in the battle, the Khan made over Turkistan to him; and on this account disagreement arose between the Kazakh Khanate and Sultan Mahmud Khan, who had previously been on terms of friendship. The Kazakhs complained that he should not have given over a territory to their enemy, the Uzbeks; in consequence of this quarrel, between the Moghuls and the Kazakh Khanate, two battles took place, Sultan Mahmud Khan suffering defeat on both occasions.
