= Battle of Ulytau =

Battle between the Kazakh Khanate and Khanate of Bukhara

- Part of the Kazakh–Uzbek War (1509–1510) of Kazakh–Uzbek Wars
Date	1510
Location	Ulytau Region, Kazakhstan
Result	Kazakh victory

Belligerents
Kazakh Khanate	Khanate of Bukhara

Commanders and leaders
(Kazakh Khanate) Kasym Khan (Kazakh Khanate) Moyunsiz-Hassan	(Khanate of Bukhara) Muhammad Shaybani (Khanate of Bukhara) Timur Sultan (Khanate of Bukhara) Ubayd'Allah sultan (Khanate of Bukhara) Qanbar Mirza †

The Battle of Ulytau was a military battle during the Kazakh–Uzbek War of 1509–1510 in which the Kazakh Khanate defeated the Khanate of Bukhara in 1510. This led to Bukharan retreat from the Dasht-i-Kipchak region.

== Background ==
In winter of 1510, Muhammad Shaybani launched another campaign into the Dasht-i-Kipchak region. He set up camp near Sighnaq and sent his troops, led by Timur Sultan and Ubaydullah Sultan, towards the Ulytau region, where Kasym Khan of the Kazakhs were present. Kasym Khan did not engage in battle and retreated. Later, Shaybani's commanders settled in their abandoned camp after Kasym's retreat, and started sharing spoils. While Kasym Khan had led his troops to maneuver the Bukharan army.

== Course of the Battle ==
Soon, Kasym sent a detachment led by one of his biy, Moyunsiz-Hasan, which his detachment unexpectedly attacked the Shaybanid camp at the night. The Bukharans were unaware of the Kazakh attack and had not set any guards at the camp. As a result, their army was disorganized and was unable to mount an effective defense. This led a decisive victory for the Kazakh detachment.

The survivors of the Kazakh attack later fled to Muhammad Shaybani's headquarters, alerting Muhammad Shaybani of the Kazakh attack. Soon after, rumors spread that Kasym Khan's main forces were advancing, leading to Muhammad Shaybani's retreat from Dasht-i-Kipchak.

It was only by the end of winter that the remnants of the defeated Uzbek army managed to reach Transoxiana.
