= Battle of Sighnaq (1509) =

Part of the Kazakh-Uzbek Wars

- Part of the Kazakh–Uzbek War (1509–1510) of Kazakh–Uzbek Wars
Date	1509
Location	Sighnaq, Kazakhstan
Result	Uzbek victory

Belligerents
Kazakh Khanate	Khanate of Bukhara

Commanders and leaders
(Kazakh Khanate) Janysh Sultan (AWOL) (Kazakh Khanate) Ahmet Sultan (POW) (executed)	(Khanate of Bukhara) Muhammad Shaybani (Khanate of Bukhara) Suyunchkhwaja Khan (Khanate of Bukhara) Ubayd'Allah Sultan (Khanate of Bukhara) Quchqunji Sultan (Khanate of Bukhara) Hamza Sultan

The Battle of Sighnaq was a military battle between the Kazakh Khanate and the invading Khanate of Bukhara, during the Kazakh–Uzbek War of 1509–1510 in 1509.

== Background ==
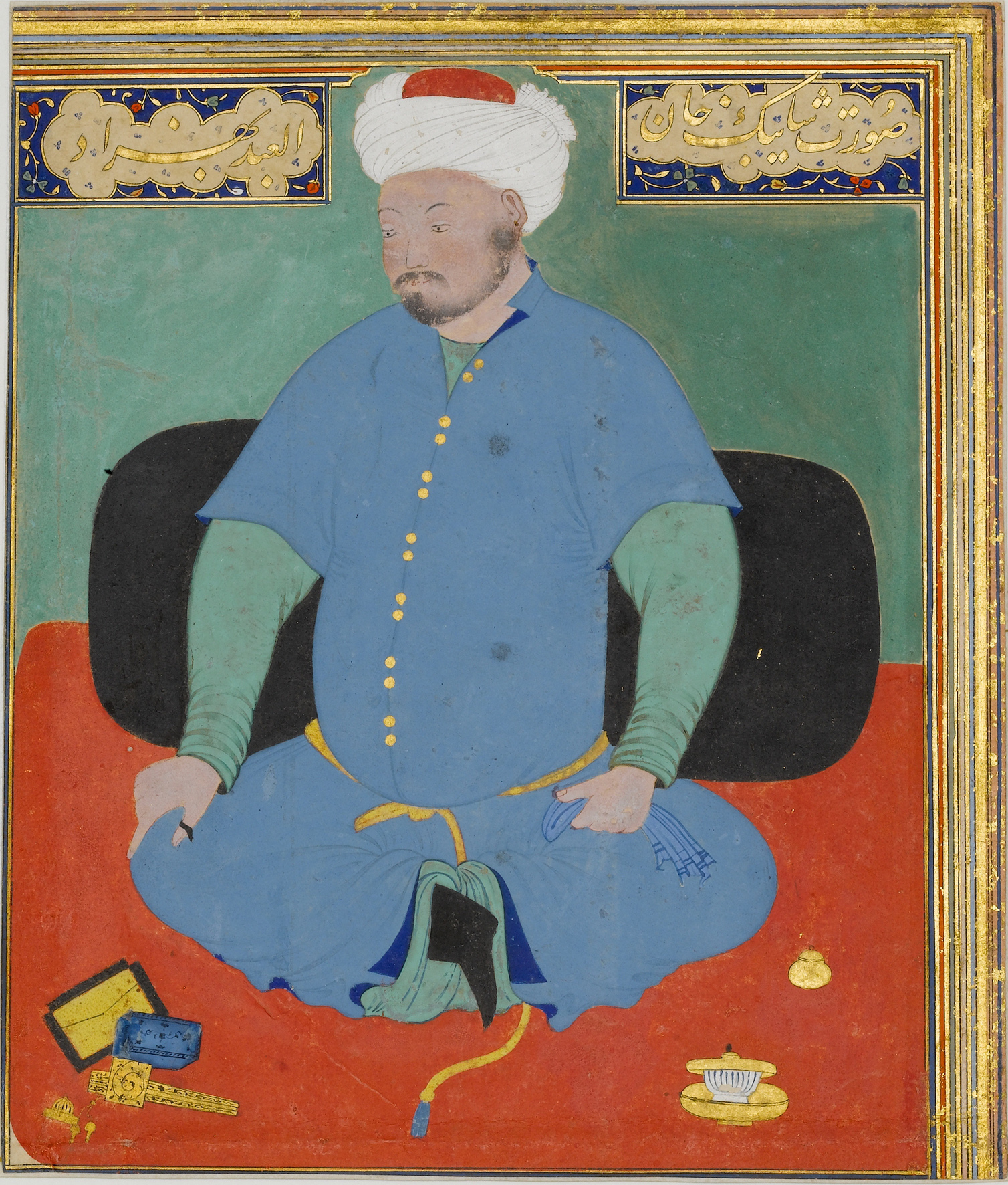
Portrait of the Bukharan Khan, Muhammad Shaybani.

In early 1509, a meeting was held in Bukhara, which Muhammad Shaybani of the Khanate of Bukhara gained the support from the Muslim clergy. Which agreed to invade the Kazakhs as a religious war. The Bukharan army soon invaded the Kazakhs in late January 1509. A force of 300,000 men soon reached the fortress of Arquq near Sighnaq. Later other Shaybanid force crossed the Syr Darya and joined Shaybani. In February 1509, the Syr Darya river had faced a heavy winter, halting the Bukharan advance until early March, where he reached the Kazakh ulus of Janysh Sultan.

== Course of the Battle ==
After Muhammad Shaybani stopped his army at Kara-Adbal and established a headquarter and had not joined the battle, he ordered a series of raids to Shaybanid commanders of: Suyunchoja Khan, Ubaydallah Sultan, Kuchkunji Sultan and Hamza Sultan to charge against the Kazakhs with targeting Janysh's uluses.

Janysh Sultan was falsely informed, believing only the forces of Suyunchoja Khan attacked. This caused him to lead an army and ambushed the forces of Ubaydallah. However, the personal guard of Muhammad Shaybani, which was significantly larger than the Kazakh army attacked the Kazakhs and inflicted heavy casualties among them. During which—the son of Janysh Sultan—Ahmet had been wounded and captured by the Kazakhs. He was later executed by Hamza Sultan in revenge for Janysh's raid against the Bukharans early the year.

== Bibliography ==
Atygaev, Nurlan (2023). КАЗАХСКОЕ ХАНСТВО: ОЧЕРКИ ВНЕШНЕПОЛИТИЧЕСКОЙ ИСТОРИИ XV-XVII BEKOВ [Essays on the Foreign Policy History of the 15th–17th Centuries] (in Russian). Almaty: Eurasian Research Institute. ISBN 978-601-7805-24-1.

Baipakov, K. M.; Kozybaev, M. K.; Kumekov, B. E.; Pishulina, K. A. (1997). История Казахстана (с древнейших времён до наших дней) [History of Kazakhstan (from ancient times to the present day)] (in Russian). Almaty: Atamura. ISBN 5-7667-4695-4.

Sultanov, T. I. (2006). Поднятые на белой Кошме. Ханы казахских степей [Raised on the White Felt. Khans of the Kazakh Steppes] (in Russian). Astana: Astana Damu-21. ISBN 9965-9522-8-0.
