= Muhammad Zaman Mirza =

Ruler of Gujarat and general

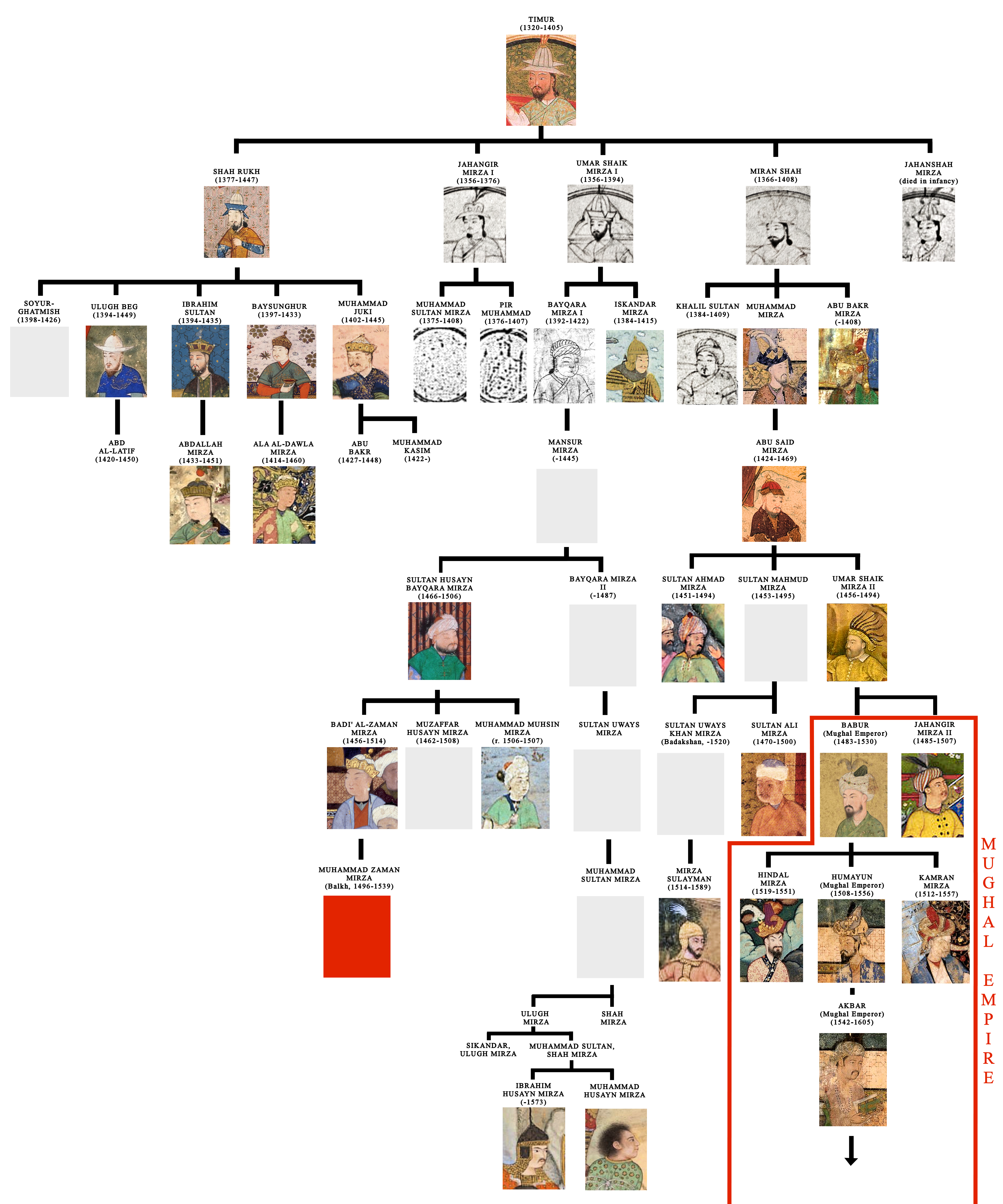
- Muhammad Zaman Mirza ( ) in Timurid genealogy
- Born: 1496
- Died: 1539 (aged 42–43)
- Spouse: Masuma Sultan Begum
- Dynasty: Timurid dynasty
- Father: Badi' al-Zaman Mirza
- Mother: Daughter of Tahamtan Beg

Muhammad Zaman Mirza (1496–1539) was a Timurid prince, and prominent military general to Mughal Emperors Babur and Humayun. He was proclaimed the ruler of Gujarat in 1537. Taking control of the royal treasury, he minted coinage in his own name (Sikka) but ruled as a sovereign for only a 16-month period before being ousted by rebel noble factions.

== Early life ==
Muhammad Zaman Mirza was the son of Badi' al-Zaman Mirza, the Timurid ruler of Herat. His mother was the daughter of Tahamtan Beg and the niece of Asad Beg. He was the grandson of Sultan Husayn Mirza Bayqara and Bega Sultan Begum. He was married to Masuma Sultan Begum, Babur's daughter by Masuma Sultan Begum, a daughter of Sultan Ahmed Mirza.

== Career ==
He tried to exert his independence early on but was imprisoned at Bayana by order of Emperor Humayun, but he managed to escape and took refuge in Gujarat Sultanate where Sultan Qutb-ud-Din Bahadur Shah welcomed him.

On December 23, 1534 while on board the galleon St. Mattheus, Sultan Qutb-ud-Din Bahadur Shah signed the Treaty of Bassein. Based on the terms of the agreement, the Portuguese Empire gained control of the city of Bassein, as well as its territories, islands, and seas. In 1535, Gujarat was occupied by the Mughals, and Bahadur Shah was forced to conclude an alliance with the Portuguese to regain the country, conceding Daman and Diu, Mumbai, and Vasai to the Portuguese. In February 1537, he was killed by the Portuguese while visiting them on a Portuguese ship anchored off the coast of Gujarat, and his body was dumped into the Arabian Sea.

Sultan Qutb-ud-Din Bahadur Shah had no legitimate son, hence there was some uncertainty regarding succession after his death. Muhammad Zaman Mirza, the timuird-Mughal prince and general made his claim on the grounds that Bahadur's mother had adopted him as her son. Sensing the risks in this declaration, some of the Gujarati nobles selected Sultan Qutb-ud-Din Bahadur Shah's nephew Miran Muhammad Shah I of Khandesh as his successor, but he died on his way to Gujarat. Finally, said nobles selected Mahmud Khan, son of Bahadur's brother Latif Khan as his successor and he was proclaimed ruler under the regnal name of Mahmud Shah III of Gujarat on May 10, 1538.

Afterwards, Muhammad Zaman Mirza made an agreement with the Portuguese in which he would yield Mangrol and Daman and a band of land along the entire coast, in return for their support but the Gujarati nobles defeated Muhammad Zaman Mirza in battle who fled to Delhi.

== See also ==
- Mughal Empire
- Babur
- Humayun
