= Muhammad Shaybani =

Uzbek leader and warrior (1451–1510)

Muhammad Shaybani محمد شیبانی
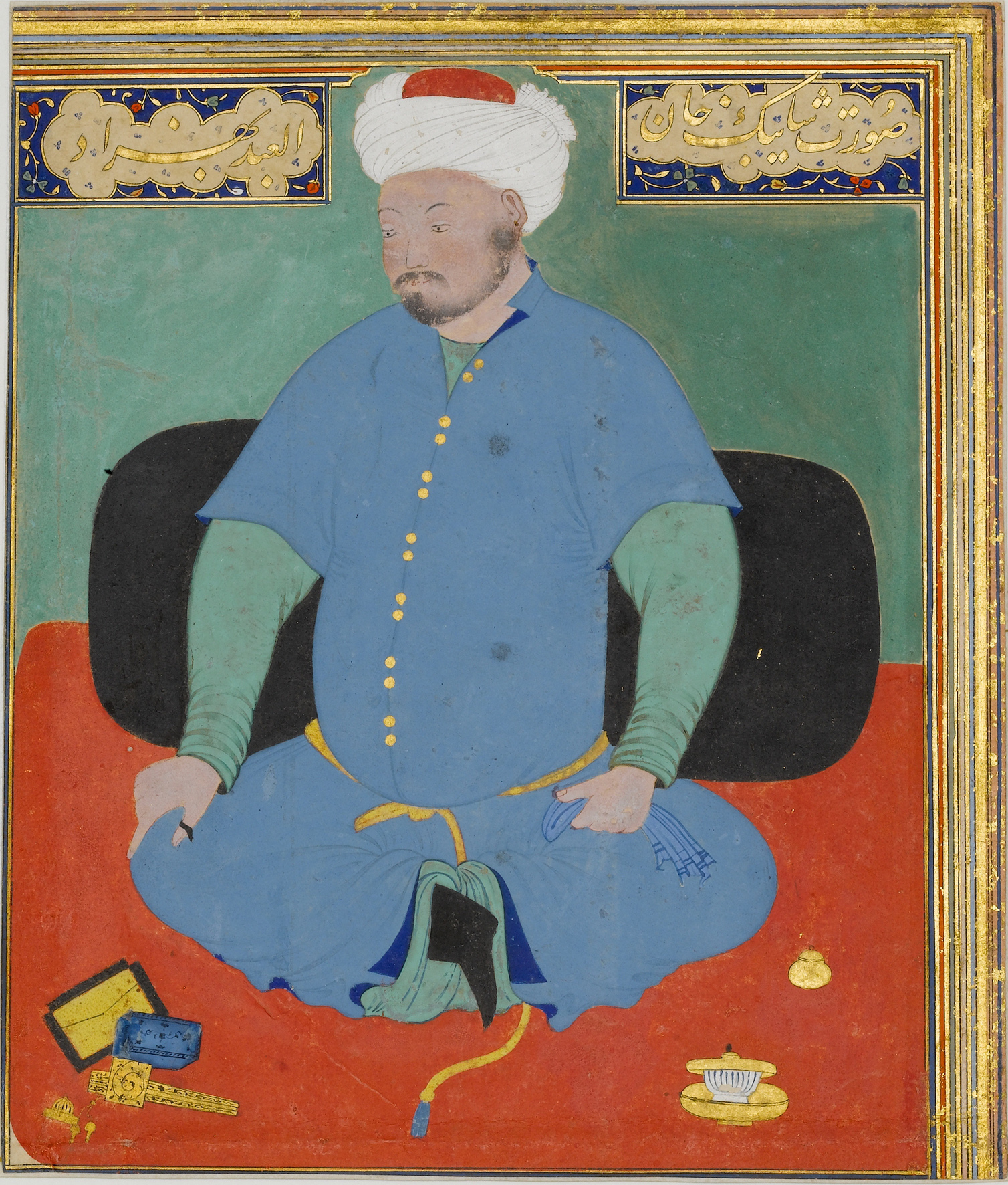
- Portrait by Kamāl ud-Dīn Behzād (c. 1507)

Khan of the Bukhara Khanate
- Reign: 1500 – 2 December 1510
- Predecessor: Sheikh Haidar (as Uzbek Khan)
- Successor: Jan Wafa Mirza
- Born: 1451; Central Asia
- Died: 2 December 1510 (aged 58–59); Merv, present-day Turkmenistan
- Spouse: Mihr Nigar Khanum; Khanzada Begum; Aisha Sultan Khanum; Khanzada Khanum a daughter Muhammad Mazidbeg; Sevinch Kutlug Aga a mother Muhammad Timur sultan
- Issue: Muhammad Temur Sultan; Khurram Shah Sultan; Sevinch Muhammad sultan
Names
- Abu'I-Fath Muhammad Shaybani Khan bin Shahbudak Sultan
- House: Borjigin
- Dynasty: Shaybanids
- Father: Shah Budag Sultan
- Mother: Aq Quzi Begum
- Religion: Sunni Islam
- Military career
- Conflicts: Timurid wars; Battle of the Chirciq River (1488); Siege of Samarkand (1497); Siege of Samarkand (1501); Battle of Sar-e-Pul (1501); Battle of Akhsi (1503); Kazakh wars; Kazakh invasion (1509-1510); Safavid wars; Battle of Marv (1510) †

Muhammad Shaybani Khan (Chagatai and Persian: محمد شیبانی; c. 1451 – 2 December 1510) (Note: Also known as Abul-Fath Shaybani Khan, Shayabak Khan, Shahi Beg Khan (originally named "Shibägh", which means "wormwood" or "obsidian").) was an Uzbek leader who consolidated various Uzbek tribes and laid the foundations for their ascendance in Transoxiana and the establishment of the Khanate of Bukhara. He was a Shaybanid or descendant of Shiban (or Shayban). He was the son of Shah-Budag, thus a grandson of the Uzbek conqueror Abu'l-Khayr Khan.

== Biography ==
The ruler of the Uzbek ulus Abu'l-Khayr Khan (1428–1468) had eleven sons, one of whom was Budaq Sultan, the father of Shaybani Khan. Shaybani Khan's mother's name was Aq Quzi Begum. Through his mother, Muhammad Shaybani was therefore the cousin of Janibek's son Kasym Khan, the latter of whom ultimately conquered most of Shaybani's territory to expand the Kazakh Khanate.

According to the historian Kamal ad-Din Binai, Budaq Sultan named his eldest son as Sultan Muhammad Shaybani, and gave him the nickname Shibägh "Wormwood".

According to sources, the genealogy of Shaybani Khan is as follows: Abu'l-Fath Muhammad Khan Shaybani, known under the name of Shakhibek Khan, son of Sultan Budaq, son of Abu'l-Khayr Khan, son of Daulat Shaikh-oglan, son of Ibrahim-oglan, son of Fulad-oglan, son of Munk Timur Khan, son of Abdal-oglan, son of Jochi-Buk Khan, son of Yis-Buk, son of Baniyal-Bahadur, son of Shiban, son of Jochi Khan, son of Genghis Khan.

In the Selected Chronicles from the "Book of Victories" (Chagatay: تواریخ گزیده نصرت‌نامه, romanized: Tavārīkh-i Guzīda-yi Nuṣratnāma), it is noted that the wife of the ancestor of Shaybani Khan, Munk Timur, was the daughter of Jandibek, who was a descendant of Ismail Samani.

Shaybani's father Budaq Sultan was an educated person on whose order extensive translations of Persian works into the Turkic languages were accomplished. Shaybani himself was fluent in both Persian and Turkic.

== Rise to power ==
Shaybani was initially an Uzbek warrior leading a contingent of 3,000 men in the army of the Timurid ruler of Samarkand, Sultan Ahmed Mirza under the Amir, Abdul Ali Tarkhan. However, when Ahmed Mirza went to war against Sultan Mahmud Khan, the Khan of Moghulistan, to reclaim Tashkent from him, Shaybani secretly met the Moghul Khan and agreed to betray and plunder Ahmed's army. This happened in the Battle of the Chirciq River in 1488 CE, resulting in a decisive victory for Moghulistan. Sultan Mahmud Khan gave Turkistan to Shaybani as a reward. Here, however, Shaybani oppressed the local Kazakhs, resulting in a war between Moghulistan and the Kazakh Khanate. Moghulistan was defeated in this war, but Shaybani gained power among the Uzbeks. He decided to conquer Samarkand and Bukhara from Ahmed Mirza. Sultan Mahmud's subordinate emirs convinced him to aid Shaybani in doing so, and together they marched on Samarkand.

== Foundation of Shaybanid Dynasty ==
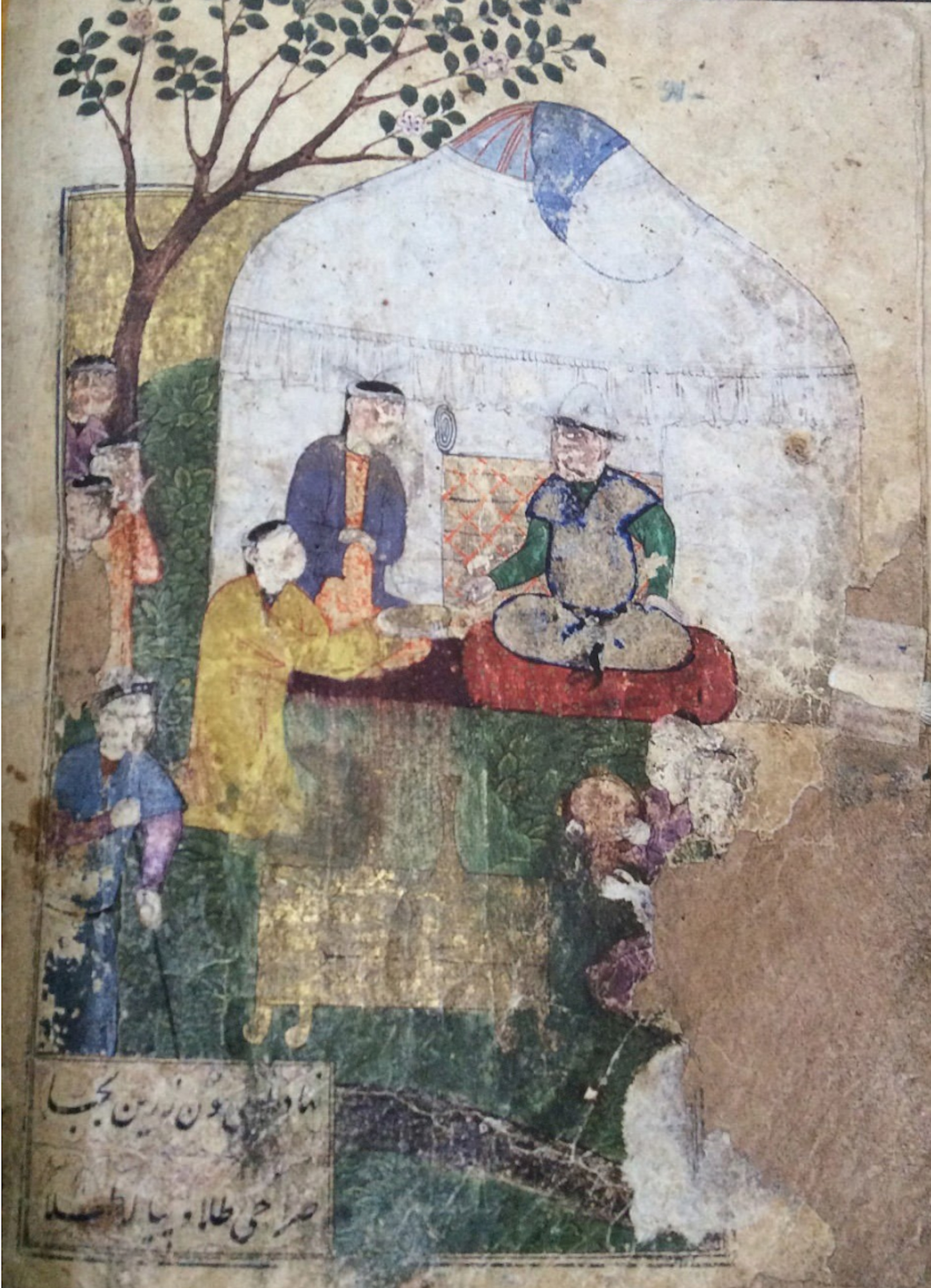
Muhammad Shibani Khan in front of his yurt (Fath-nama of Muhammad Shadi, ca. 1507 AD, Tashkent, Biruni Institute, ms. N° 5369)

Continuing the policies of his grandfather, Abu'l-Khayr Khan, Shaybani ousted the Timurids from their capital Samarkand in 1500. He fought successful campaigns against the Timurid leader Babur, founder of the Mughal Empire. In 1501 he recaptured Samarkand and in 1507 also took Herat, the southern capital of the Timurids. Shaybani conquered Bukhara in 1501 and established the Shaybanid Dynasty of the Khanate of Bukhara. In 1508–09, he carried out many raids northward, pillaging the land of the Kazakh Khanate. However, his armies suffered a major defeat from Kazakhs under Kasym Khan in 1510.

One day Shaybani visited Sheikh Mansour and he (Mansour) said to him: "I look at you, Uzbek, and I see that you desire to become a sovereign!". And then he ordered food to be served. When everything was eaten and the tablecloth was removed, Sheikh Mansour said: "As a tablecloth is collected from the edges, so you should start from the periphery of the state (kingdom)." Shaybani took this very unambiguous advice from his new mentor into account and eventually conquered the Timurid state.

— Sultanov T. I., Genghis Khan and Genghisids. - Moscow, 2006. p.139

== Foreign policy ==
Shaybani Khan maintained ties with Ottoman Empire and Ming China. In 1503, his ambassadors arrived at the court of the Ming emperor. Aligning with the Ottoman sultan Bayezid II (1481–1512), Shaybani Khan opposed the Shia Safavid Shah Ismail I.

== Religious policy ==
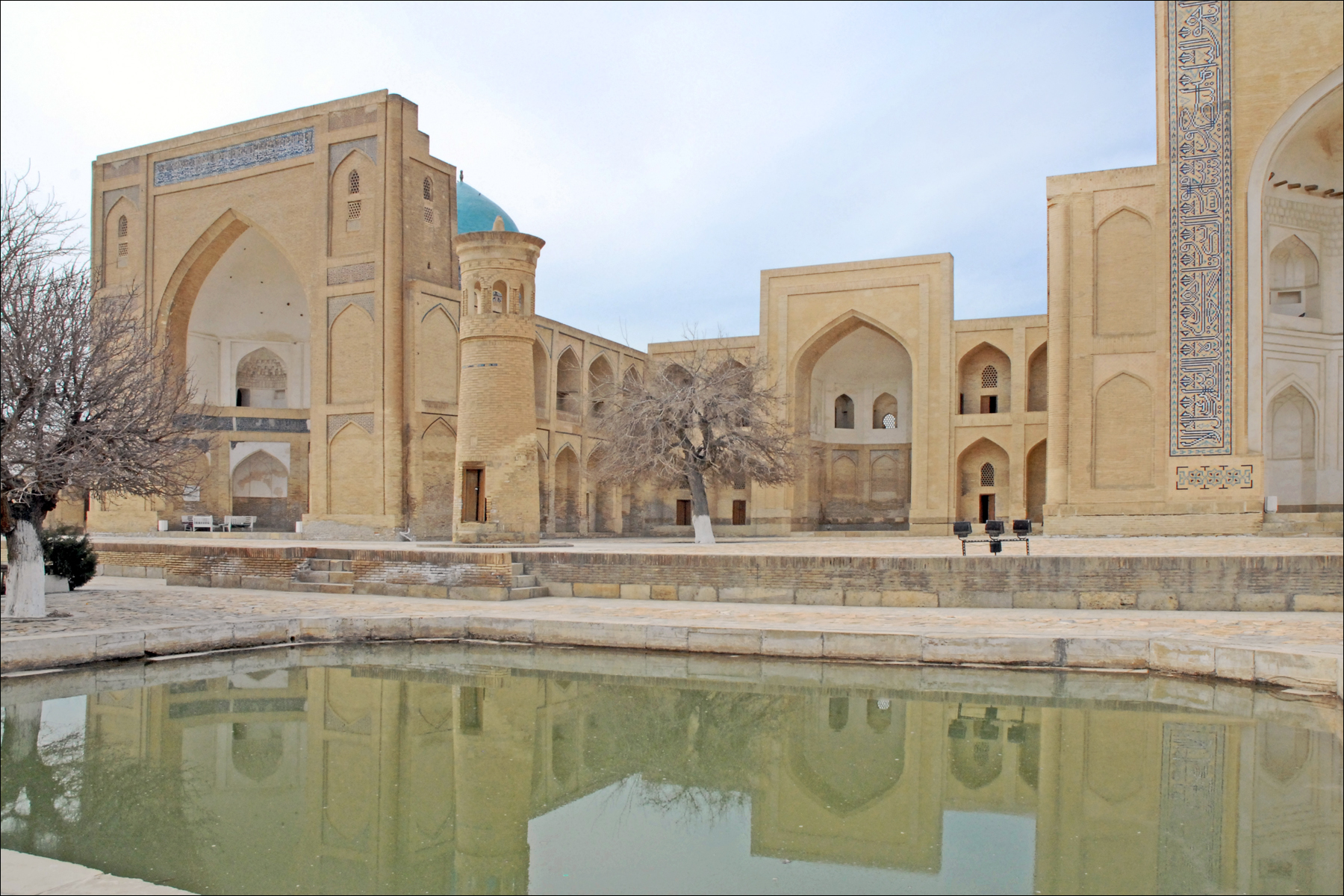
Chor-Bakr memorial complex, built under Muhammad Shaybani c. 1510, Bukhara

Shaybani Khan did not make any distinction between Iranians and Turks based on ethnicity, but followed the hadith of Muhammad: "All Muslims are brothers".

One of the authoritative religious figures, a native of Yemen, Emir Sayyid Shams ad-Din Abdallah al-Arabi al-Yamani al Khadramauti (known as Mir-i Arab), enjoyed the patronage of Shaybani Khan, and constantly took part in the meetings of the divan (court) and accompanied the Khan in his campaigns.

Shayibani Khan wrote a prose essay called the Risale-yi maarif-i Shayibani in the Chagatai language in 1507 shortly after his capture of Khorasan and is dedicated to his son, Muhammad Timur (the manuscript is kept in Istanbul).

The manuscript of his philosophical and religious work: "Bahr ul-Khudo", written in the Central Asian Turkic literary language in 1508 is located in London.

== Later years ==
The last years of Shaybani Khan were not easy. In the spring of 1509, his mother died. After her funeral in Samarkand, he went to Qarshi, where he held a meeting with relatives and allowed them to disperse to their uluses (small countries). Ubaydullah's nephew went to Bukhara, Muhammad Temur to Samarkand, and Hamza Sultan to Gissar. Shaybani Khan went to Merv (now Mary, Turkmenistan) with a small detachment.

== Death ==
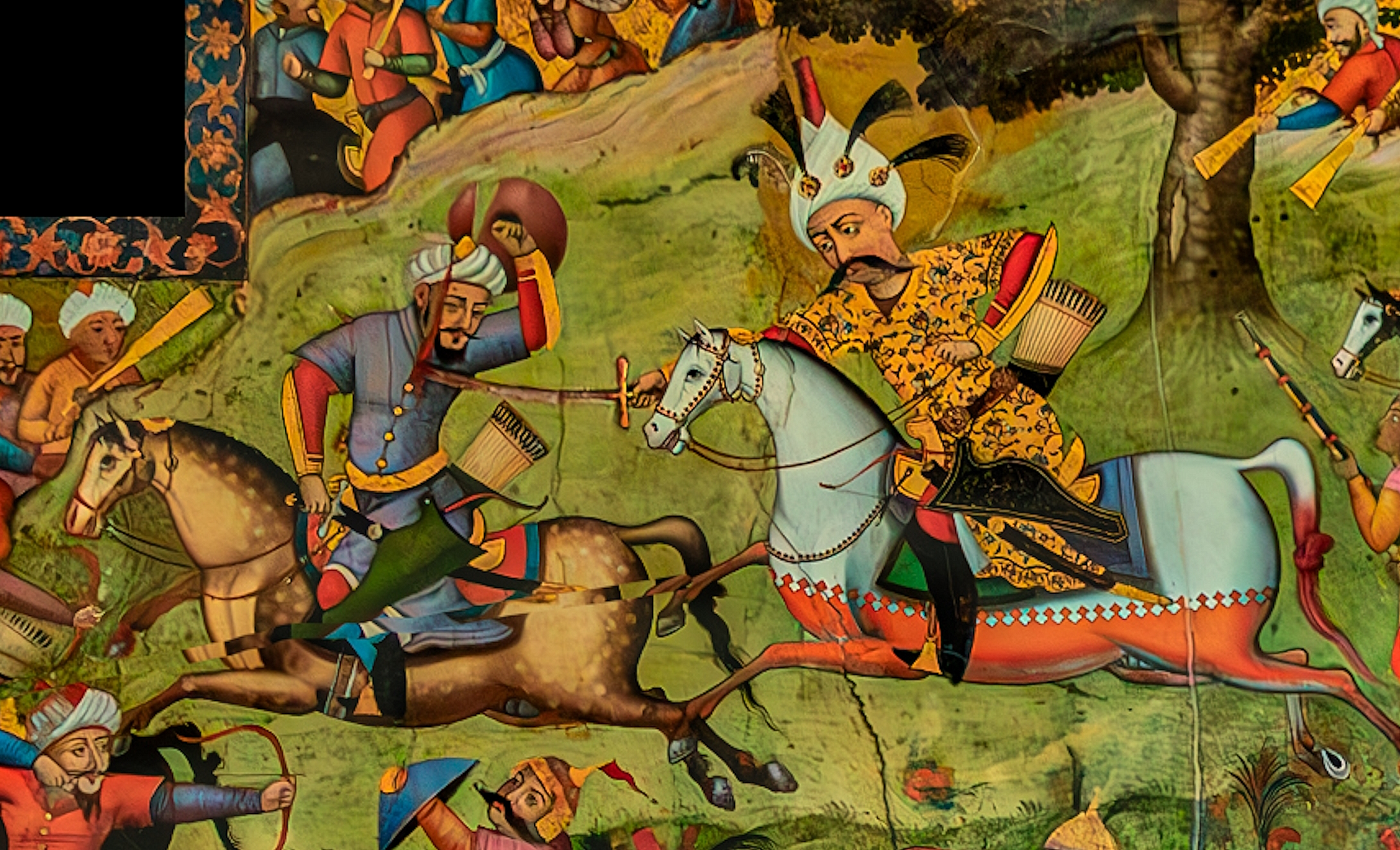
The battle between Ismail I (right) and Muhammad Shaybani (left) in 1510. Chehel Sotoun, Isfahan, painted circa 1647

In 1510, Shaybani Khan was in Herat. At this time, Ismail I, the Safavid emperor, having learned about the failures of Shaybani Khan and angered by his staunch support of Sunni Islam, moved against the Uzbeks and invaded western Khorasan, rapidly advancing towards Herat.

Shaybani Khan did not have a strong army at his disposal. During the military campaign against the Hazaras, he lost most of his cavalry. The main army was stationed in Transoxiana, so he, having consulted with his emirs, hastened to hide behind the walls of Merv. Safavid troops captured Astrabad, Mashhad, and Sarakhs. All Shaybani's emirs who were in Khorasan, including Jan Wafa, fled from the Qizilbash soldiers of Safavid Iran and arrived to Merv. Shaybani Khan sent a messenger to Ubaydullah Khan of the Khanate of Bukhara and the Timurids for help. Meanwhile, Ismail surrounded Merv and besieged the city for a whole month, but to no avail. Therefore, to lure the khan out of the city, he resorted to a feigned retreat.

According to some sources, one of the wives of Muhammad Shaybani Khan, Aisha Sultan Khanum, better known as Moghul Khanum, enjoyed great influence on her husband and his court. The sources say that at the Kengesh (council of the Khan), the question arose whether or not to come out of Merv and fight the retreating troops of Shah Ismail. The emirs of Shaybani Khan suggested waiting two or three days until the auxiliary forces arrived from Transoxiana. Mogul Khanum, who took part in the military council, said to the Khan: “And you are afraid of the Qizilbash! If you are afraid, I will take the troops myself and lead them. Now is the right moment, there will be no such moment again." After these words of Mogul Khanum, everyone seemed to be ashamed, and the Khan's troops went into battle, which resulted in their complete defeat and the death of Shaybani Khan.

In the Battle of Marv (1510), Muhammad Shaybani was defeated and killed when trying to escape. Shaybani Khan's army was surrounded by Ismail's 17,000-strong army and was defeated after fierce resistance. The remnants of the army ended up dying under enemy arrows.

At the time of Shaybani's death, the Uzbeks controlled all of Transoxiana, the area between the Syr Darya and Amu Darya. After capturing Samarkand from Babur, Shaybani had married Babur's sister, Khanzada Begum. Babur's liberty to leave Samarkand was made contingent upon his assent to this alliance. After Shaybani's death, Ismail I gave liberty to Khanzada Begum with her son and, at Babur's request, sent them to his court. For this reason, Shaybani was succeeded not by a son but by an uncle, a cousin, and a brother whose descendants would rule Bukhara until 1598 and Khwarezm (later named Khiva) until 1687.

The accounts of Babur, i.e. the Baburnama, state that Emperor Ismail beheaded Shaybani and had his skull turned into a bejewelled skull cup which was drunk from when entertaining; he later sent the cup to Babur as a goodwill gesture. The rest of Shaybani's body parts were either sent to various areas of the empire for display or put on a spike at the main gate of Samarkand.

== Personality ==
Shaybani Khan was fond of history in his youth. In 1475, he was specially presented with a book about the life of Alexander the Great imported from the Ottoman Empire: the 1194 Alexander Romance of Nizami Ganjavi. The medieval author Nisari recognized Shaybani Khan as a scholar of the Quran.

The manuscript of his philosophical and religious work Bahru’l-Huda, written in the Central Asian literary language Chaghatai in 1508, is in London. Shaybani Khan used various works on theology when writing his essay. It contains his views on religious issues. The author presents his idea of the basics of Islam: repentance for sins, showing mercy, and others. Shaybani Khan shows excellent knowledge of the rituals and daily duties of devout Muslims.

== Family ==
Consorts

Shaybani had several consorts:

- a mother of Muhammad Timur sultan
- a daughter of Muhammad Mazid Tarkhan
- Sevinch Kutlug Aga (m.1500), granddaughter of Darvesh Muhammad Tarkhan
- Zuhra Begi Agha (m. 1499–1500), an Uzbek lady and formerly a consort of Sultan Mahmud Mirza;
- Mihr Nigar Khanum (m. 1500 – div. 1501), daughter of Yunus Khan and Aisan Daulat Begum, former wife of Sultan Ahmed Mirza;
- Khanzada Begum (m. 1501 – div.), daughter of Umar Shaikh Mirza II and Qutlugh Nigar Khanum, and mother of Khurram Shah;
- Aisha Sultan Khanum (m. 1503), daughter of Mahmud Khan Chaghatai, and mother of Muhammad Rahim Sultan;
- Khanzada Khanum (m. 1507), daughter of Ahmad Khan of Haji Tarkhan and Badi-ul-Jamal Begum, and former wife of Muzaffar Husayn Mirza Bayqara;

Sons

He had three sons:

- Muhammad Temur Sultan, married firstly to Mihr Sultan Khanum, daughter of Kazakh Khan Burunduq, married secondly in 1500 to Sultanum Begum, daughter of Sultan Ahmed Mirza and Qatak Begum, married thirdly in 1503 to Daulat Sultan Khanum, daughter of Yunus Khan and Shah Begum, married fourthly in 1507 to Ruqaiya Agha, former wife of Badi' al-Zaman Mirza;
- Khurram Shah Sultan – with Khanzada Begum;
- Sevinch Muhammad sultan - . He had one son, Muhammad Yar sultan

== Notes ==
Regnal titles
Preceded by Haider Sultan	Khan of the Uzbeks; Khanate of Bukhara; 1500–1510	Succeeded by Kochkunju Muhammad bin Abul-Khayr Khan
