= A Pirate of Exquisite Mind =

2004 book by Diana and Michael Preston

- Author: Diana and Michael Preston
- Genre: Non-fiction
- Published: 2004

A Pirate of Exquisite Mind: The Life of William Dampier by Diana Preston and Michael Preston is a 2004 biography of William Dampier.

== Synopsis ==
William Dampier was the first person to circumnavigate the world three times, the first Englishman to explore Australia, a pirate, and a famous scientist.

== Reception ==
The book received positive reviews from critics. A review from Publishers Weekly called it "exhaustive" and wrote that "Dampier's scientific and historical legacy holds up better than his swashbuckling escapades, which, though exciting, hold slightly less novelty." In The New York Times, a review wrote "It is extraordinary to read, in Diana and Michael Preston's carefully researched book, of a swashbuckling English pirate who was primarily motivated by a thirst for knowledge."
