= Paradise in Chains =

2017 book by Diana Preston

- Author: Diana Preston
- Genre: Non-fiction
- Published: 2017

Paradise in Chains: The Bounty Mutiny and the Founding of Australia by Diana Preston is a 2017 nonfiction book about the Mutiny on the Bounty and its historical parallels.

== Synopsis ==
The book covers the mutiny on the Bounty against William Bligh in 1789 and the early history of New South Wales, including events like Mary Bryant's escape from an Australian penal colony.

== Reception ==
The book received mostly positive reviews from critics. Publishers Weekly wrote that "Preston’s heart is with the oceanic adventurers, and readers will be titillated by tales of derring-do, but those seeking a more comprehensive history of Australia or the South Pacific should look elsewhere." A review from the Journal of British Studies wrote that "provides a clear, accurate, and engrossing account of this perennially popular story." A review from The Times criticized the decision to include several unrelated events: "Preston is an able historian and a capable writer, but her stories are sadly diminished when crammed together without clear purpose into this little book."
