= Battle of Sar-e-Pul =

Military engagement

- Part of Timurid-Uzbek Wars
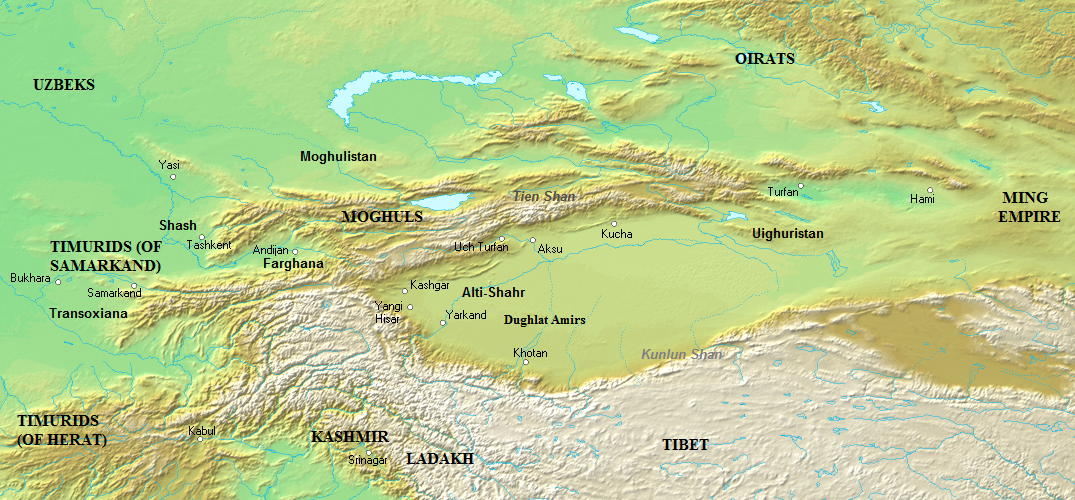
- Transoxiana & Turkestan
Date	April – May 1501 CE
Location	Transoxania, Central Asia
Result	Uzbek victory

Belligerents
Khanate of Bukhara	Timurids of Samarkand

Commanders and leaders
Muhammad Shaybani Khan; Ubaydullah Sultan Abul Ghazi; Sheikhein Mirza; Timur Sultan; Jani Beg Sultan; Kuchum Khan Uzbek; Siunjek Sultan; Mahmud Sultan; Gujenjeh Khan; Amir Yaqub; Jan Wafa Mirza; Hamza Sultan; Fazil Tarkhan; Mahdi Sultan	Zahir-ud-din Muhammad Babur; Muhammed Majid Tarkhan; Qamber Ali Bayg Sarik-bash Mirza; Ibrahim Tarkhan †; Ibrahim Saru †; Khalil Tambol †

After the Uzbeks were driven out of Samarkand in early 1501 CE, they regrouped in Bukhara. Muhammad Shaybani began to prepare for another attempt to take Samarkand in April - May 1501 CE. Babur, the Timurid leader, decided to meet this threat before it arrived at the city. The two armies met at Sar-e-Pul, where a decisive battle was fought which decided the fate of the Timurids and of the region, resulting in gradual conquest of Transoxiana, Khwarezm and Khorasan by the Uzbeks.

== Background ==
The Uzbeks though driven from Samarkand possessed the populous city of Bukhara and its fertile territory and could recruit their force by drawing repeated swarms of war hardened Uzbeks from the deserts plus all the Uzbeks expelled from other territories flocked to Bukhara. Compared with that, Samarkand recently suffered from misgovernment; from repeated revolutions and the ravages of hostile and of friendly armies. Its resources depleted, much of its wealth destroyed or removed and time was required to repair its losses and restore the credit and confidence of its inhabitants. As the military forces of the kingdom were at the moment very inadequate to its defense the young Babur sent ambassadors to all the neighboring princes to solicit assistance of which he received little. He was therefore forced to rely on his own limited resources.

== Initial Skirmishes ==
Muhammad Shaybani took the Fort Dabusi in Sughd (in Tajikistan). This triggered alarm bells in Babur’s mind and he decided to set out towards Bukhara to meet this challenge. In May 1501, he proceeded by slow marches on the road to Bukhara while Shaybani advancing in the opposite direction encamped about four miles from him. Babur fortified his camp with a palisade and ditch. Daily skirmishes took place between their advanced parties and pickets. Shaybani attempted a night surprise but found the camp too well fortified and guarded to carry out an attack and was forced to retire.

A battle however seemed inevitable and Babur's mind was evidently fixed on the preparations for it. Perhaps this state of excitement working on his military ardor rendered him too impatient for he resolved to hazard an engagement, though reinforcements to the amount of two or three thousand men would have joined him in the course of two days.

== The battle ==
The armies prepared for battle. Babur marched out with men in four divisions consisting of right wing and left, center and advance according to the fashion of the times. As they moved forward with their right flank on the River Kohik (Zeravshan River) which runs from Samarkand towards Bukhara, they were met by the enemy drawn up ready to receive them.

The hostile army was far the most numerous and the extremity of its right turned Babur's left flank and wheeled upon his rear. This compelled him to change his position by throwing back his left; in doing which, his advance, which was posted in front of the center and composed of his best men and officers, was necessarily thrown to the right. The battle was nevertheless manfully supported and the assailants in front driven back on their center. It was even thought at one time by Shaybani’s best officers, that the battle was lost and they advised him to quit the field. Meanwhile, however, the Uzbek's flanking division, having driven in Babur's left, attacked his center in the rear pouring in showers of arrows and the whole left of his line being thus forced in and thrown into disorder that with the center became a scene of inextricable confusion. Only ten or fifteen men remained around Babur. They seeing that all was over rode off towards the right wing which had rested on the river and on gaining its banks plunged in armed as they were. The Uzbeks were not able to follow them. Babur kept for some time along the right bank of the river and afterwards recrossing it higher up reached Samarkand the same evening.

== Aftermath ==
No defeat could be more complete; many of Babur's bravest and most experienced officers among others Ibrahim Tarkhan, Ibrahim Saru and Khalil Tambol the brother of Sultan Ahmed Tambol with numbers of his best soldiers perished. The Officers that survived persuaded that nothing could now resist Muhammad Shaybani, scattered in various directions. Muhammed Majid Tarkhan who had once more joined Babur fled to Khusroe Shah in Kunduz, some escaped to Uratippa. Qamber Ali and others after reaching Samarkand hastily removed their families from it as from a place doomed to destruction. A very few remained in the city following the fortune of their leader. Later Babur recalls the Uzbek tactic which he believes lead to their victory;

“One great merit of the Uzbeks in battle is the flank assault. They never do battle without using it. Another is that they all, officers and ordinary soldiers alike, from front to rear, charge at a gallop shooting arrows. In retreat they do not go off pell-mell but withdraw orderly”.
