= Empire of the Moghul =

Historical fiction literature series by Alex Rutherford

- The cover of The Tainted Throne.
- Raiders from the North (2009); Brothers at War (2010); Ruler of the World (2011); The Tainted Throne (2012); The Serpent's Tooth (2013); Traitors in the Shadows (2015)
- Author: Alex Rutherford
- Country: United Kingdom
- Language: English
- Genre: Historical fiction
- Publisher: Headline Review (UK)
- Published: 2009–2015 (initial publication)
- Media type: Print (hardback & paperback)
- No. of books: 6
- Website: empireofthemoghul.com

Empire of the Moghul is a series of historical fiction novels written by Alex Rutherford (the pen name for Diana and Michael Preston). The series consists of six volumes covering the rise and height of the Moghul Empire in medieval India.

== Books ==
Book	Place of publication	Publisher	Publication year	ISBN
Raiders from the North	London	Headline Review	2009	978-0-755-34752-0
Brothers at War	London	Headline Review	2010	978-0-755-34755-1
Ruler of the World	London	Headline Review	2011	978-0-755-34758-2
The Tainted Throne	London	Headline Review	2012	978-0-755-34761-2
The Serpent's Tooth	London	Headline Review	2013	978-0-755-34764-3
Traitors in the Shadows	London	Headline Review	2015	978-1-472-20590-2

=== Raiders from the North ===
The first book in the Empire of the Moghul series introduces Babur, a charismatic warrior and ruler of Ferghana, a kingdom north of Afghanistan, a leader determined to emulate his ancestors at all costs.

It is 1494, and the new ruler of Ferghana, twelve-year-old Babur, faces a seemingly impossible challenge. Babur is determined to equal his great ancestor, Tamburlaine, whose conquests stretched from Delhi to the Mediterranean, from wealthy Persia to the wild Volga. But he is dangerously young to inherit a crown and treasonous plots, tribal rivalries, rampaging armies and ruthlessly ambitious enemies will threaten his destiny, his kingdom, even his survival.

=== Brothers at War ===
The second novel in the series tells the thrilling story of the second great Moghul Emperor, whose fatal flaws threatened everything his dynasty had fought for.

The year is 1530, Agra, Northern India and Humayun is the newly-crowned second Moghul Emperor, is a fortunate man. His father, Babur, has bequeathed him wealth, glory and an empire which stretches a thousand miles south from the Khyber pass; he must now build on his legacy, and make the Moghuls worthy of their forebear, Tamburlaine. But, unbeknown to him, Humayun is already in grave danger. His half-brothers are plotting against him; they doubt that he has the strength, the will, the brutality needed to command the Moghul armies and lead them to still-greater glories. Perhaps they are right. Soon Humayun will be locked in a terrible battle: not only for his crown, not only for his life, but for the existence of the very empire itself.

=== Ruler of the World ===
This tells the story of the third great Moghul Emperor, Akbar, leader of a triumphant dynasty which contained the seeds of its own destruction. Ruler of a sixth of the world’s people, colossally rich and utterly ruthless, Akbar was a contemporary of Elizabeth I but infinitely more powerful. His reign began in bloodshed when he strangled his treacherous ‘milk-brother’, but it ended in glory. Akbar extended his rule over much of Asia, skillfully commanding tens of thousands of men, elephants and innovative technology, yet despite the unimaginable bloodshed which resulted his empire was based on universal religious tolerance.

However, Akbar’s homelife was more complicated. He defied family, nobles and mullahs to marry a beautiful Rajput princess, whose people he had conquered; but she hated Akbar and turned Salim, his eldest son, against him. What’s more, as any Moghul prince could inherit his father’s crown and become Emperor, his sons were brought up to be intensely competitive and suspicious of each other: to see each other as rivals for the greatest prize of all. And, as Salim grew to manhood, the relationship between father and son became tainted by rebellion and competition to be the greatest Moghul of them all.

=== The Tainted Throne ===
In 1606, Jahangir, the triumphant ruler of most of the Indian subcontinent, is doomed. No amount of wealth and ruthlessness can protect him from his sons’ desire for power at any cost. The glorious Moghul throne is worth any amount of bloodshed and betrayal; it drives son against father and brother against brother, and their acts of horrific violence are only matched by mind-boggling deceit. Once Jahangir raised troops against his own father. Now he faces a bloody battle with Khurram, the ablest of his warring sons.

Worse is to come. Just as the heirs of Timur the Great share intelligence, physical strength and utter ruthlessness, they also have a great weakness for wine and opium. Once Jahangir is tempted, his talented wife, Mehrunissa, is only too willing to take up the reins of empire. She’ll stop at nothing, not even seizing Khurram’s young sons, to keep the throne in her grip. And with Khurram and his half-brothers each still determined to be their father’s heir, the savage battle for the Moghul throne will be more ferocious than even Timur could have imagined.

=== The Serpent’s Tooth ===
The new Moghul Emperor Shah Jahan reigned over an empire of 100 million people. To gain his throne he followed the ‘throne or coffin’ traditions of his ancestors – descendants of Genghis Khan and Tamburlaine. Since the Moghuls took India, brother has fought brother and sons their fathers for the prize and Shah Jahan was no exception.

As his reign dawns, now is the time for Shah Jahan to secure his throne by crushing his enemies. Instead, devastated by the death of his beautiful wife Mumtaz, he becomes obsessed with building an epic monument to their perfect love – the Taj Mahal. His overwhelming grief isolates him from his sons and he does not see the rivalries, indeed hatreds, building between them. When he falls ill, civil war breaks out – ruthless, murderous and uncontrollable and the foundations of the empire itself shake.

=== Traitors in the Shadows ===
A new emperor, Aurangzeb, sits on India’s glittering Peacock Throne – the throne he seized from his father while the old emperor still lived. He has paid for it with blood: during the brutal civil war he hunted down and killed his brothers. Now he must return the Moghul Empire to the true path and achieve new glory. But the exercise of great power is isolating. With enemies everywhere, who should he trust? Certainly not his sons. He must rely on himself and the knowledge that there are more ways to subdue a man than on the battlefield. But as the years pass memories haunt him – memories of a father who never loved him and a mother who lies in the Taj Mahal; of murdered brothers and of sons and daughters locked in sunless prisons. He tells himself that everything he has done has been necessary – moral, even.

== Adaptations ==
=== Television ===
The Empire is an Indian television adaptation of the books created by Nikkhil Advani for Disney+ Hotstar. The first season of the series adapts first volume of the novel series and stars Kunal Kapoor, Drashti Dhami, Shabana Azmi, and Dino Morea among others. The first season debuted on 27 August 2021 on Disney+ Hotstar and Hotstar globally.
