= Alex Rutherford =

British writing duo

Alex Rutherford is the collective pen name of two writers, Diana Preston and her husband Michael Preston. "Rutherford" is known for the six-book historical fiction series Empire of the Moghul.

The Prestons studied at the University of Oxford in history and English respectively.

Their research into the building of the Taj Mahal led them to explore the early history of the dynasty which built it – the Mughal Empire. Over the years they have also retraced the steps of the Mughals from the Ferghana Valley in Kyrgyzstan – home to the first Moghul emperor, the boy-king Babur – to Iran and to the blue domes and minarets of Samarkand in Uzbekistan, across the red deserts to the Oxus River, over the Hindu Kush to Kabul and Afghanistan and down through the Khyber Pass to the plains of northern India. Empire of the Moghul consists of six books which is about the epic rise and fall of one of the world’s most powerful, opulent, and glamorous dynasties across 200 years.

Until the series they had done only serious non-fiction, and it was their first attempt at historical fiction. They decided to create a new persona to make a distinction between their earlier writing and this new series. "Rutherford" came from the Nobel Laureate Ernest Rutherford, and Alex was chosen as a name that could be male or female.

== Books ==
=== By Diana and Michael Preston ===
- Paradise in Chains: The Bounty Mutiny and the Founding of Australia
- A Pirate of Exquisite Mind: Explorer, Naturalist, and Buccaneer: The Life of William Dampier
- Taj Mahal: Passion and Genius at the Heart of the Moghul Empire
- A Teardrop on the Cheek of Time: The Story of the Taj Mahal

=== By "Alex Rutherford" ===
- Empire of the Moghul: Raiders from the North
- Empire of the Moghul: Brothers at War
- Empire of the Moghul: Ruler of the World
- Empire of the Moghul: The Tainted Throne
- Empire of the Moghul: The Serpent's Tooth
- Empire of the Moghul: Traitors in the Shadows
- Fortune's Soldier
- Fortune's Heir
