= Mihr Nigar Khanum =

- Princess of Moghulistan; Consort of Samarkand consort of Bukhara consort of the Shaybanid Empire
- Spouse: Sultan Ahmed Mirza; Muhammad Shaybani
Names
- Mihr Nigar
- House: Borjigin (by birth)
- Father: Yunus Khan
- Mother: Aisan Daulat Begum
- Religion: Sunni Islam

Mihr Nigar Khanum (Chagatai and Persian: مهر نگار خانم) was the first wife of Sultan Ahmed Mirza, the King of Samarkand and Bukhara. She was a princess of Moghulistan by birth and was the eldest daughter of Yunus Khan, the Great Khan of Moghulistan and his chief consort Aisan Daulat Begum. She was also the aunt of Emperor Babur, the founder of the Mughal Empire of India as well as its first Emperor.

In July 1500, after her husband's death, she was captured by Muhammad Shaybani, the Khan of the Uzbeks; and was forcibly married to him as part of the spoils.

== Family and lineage ==
Mihr Nigar Khanum was born a princess of Moghulistan and was the eldest daughter of Yunus Khan, the Great Khan of Moghulistan and his chief consort Aisan Daulat Begum. Her paternal grandfather was Uwais Khan, the Moghul Khan of Mughalistan and her father's predecessor. Mihr Nigar Khanum was, thus, a direct descendant of Genghis Khan, the founder and Great Khan (Emperor) of the Mongol Empire.

Her two younger sisters were Qutlugh Nigar Khanum and Khub Nigar Khanum. Qutlugh later married Umar Sheikh Mirza, the brother of Sultan Ahmed Mirza, Mihr Nigar's husband.

As the daughter of a Khan, Mihr Nigar was born with the title "Khanum".

== Marriages ==
=== Sultan Ahmed Mirza ===
Mihr Nigar Khanum was married to Sultan Ahmad Mirza, the eldest son and successor of Abu Sa'id Mirza. She remained in his harem until his death in 1494.

=== Shaybani Khan Uzbek ===
In early of July, 1500, she was captured by Shaibani and married by him. In 1500-1 she was divorced when he wished to marry Khanzada Begum, her niece. She then stayed awhile in Samarkand. In 1501-2 she went to Tashkand and joined the large family party which assembled there. In the middle of 1505, she came to Kabul with other kinsfolk, soon after the death of her mother and of her father, and during the ceremonial mourning of Babur for his mother. "Our grief broke out afresh," he writes.

Mirza Haidar gives a pleasant account of the welcome she accorded her generous and kindly nephew Babur in 1506–7, when he put down Khan Mirza Wais's rebellion in Kabul: "The Emperor leapt up and embraced his beloved aunt with every manifestation of affection. The khanum said to him: " Your children, wives, and household are longing to see you. I give thanks that I have been permitted to see you again. Rise up and go to your family in the castle. I too am going thither."

In 1507, when Khan Mirza set out for Badakhshan with his grandmother, Shah Begum, to try his fortunes in her father's ancient lands, "Mihr Nigar also wished to go. It would have been better and more becoming," writes Babar, "for her to remain with me. I was her nearest relation. But however much I dissuaded her, she continued obstinate and also set out for Badakhshan.

== Death ==
Mihr Nigar rued her self will. She and Shah Begam were captured on their way to Qila' Zafar by one of Abubakr Dughlat's ' marauding bands,' and in the prisons of that wretched miscreant they departed from this perishable world.
