= Khanzada Begum =

Elder sister of Emperor Babur

- Timurid princess and Padshah Begum
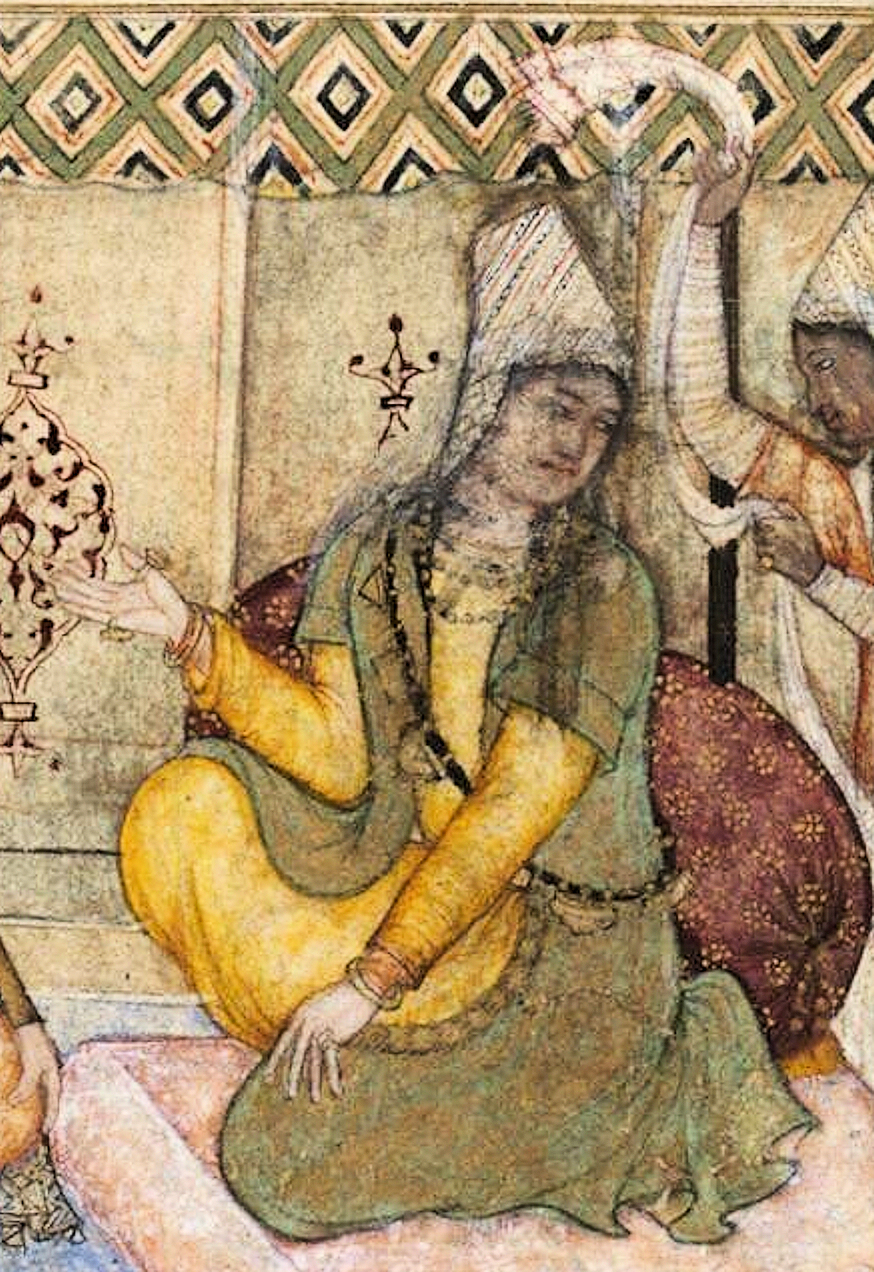
- Khanzade Begum in 1510. Miniature from the Baburnama of 1590

Empress consort of the Shaybanid Empire
- Tenure: 1501 – 2 December 1510
- Born: c. 1478; Andizhan, Ferghana, Uzbekistan
- Died: September 1545 (aged 66–67); Qandahar, Afghanistan
- Burial: Gardens of Babur, Kabul
- Spouse: Shaybani Khan; Mahdi Khwaja
- Issue: Khurram Shah
- House: House of Timur (by birth)
- Father: Umar Sheikh Mirza
- Mother: Qutlugh Nigar Khanum
- Religion: Sunni Islam

Khanzada Begum (Persian: خانزاده بیگم; c. 1478 – 1545) was a Timurid princess and the eldest daughter of Umar Shaikh Mirza II, the amir of Ferghana. She was also the elder sister of Babur, the founder of the Mughal Empire. She and her brother remained deeply attached to each other all their lives, a period during which the family progressed from ruling a tiny and obscure principality in Central Asia to ruling a large portion of the Indian subcontinent.

Khanzada Begum is frequently mentioned in the Baburnama, her brother's memoirs, and always with affection and respect. She is also frequently mentioned in the Humayun-nama by her niece Gulbadan Begum, who calls her aunt 'Dearest Lady' (aka janam). Many occasions are described where she intervened during political difficulties between her relatives and more specifically her nephews.

== Family and lineage ==
Khanzada Begum was born c. 1478 in Andizhan, Ferghana, as the eldest daughter of Umar Sheikh Mirza and his first wife and chief consort Qutlugh Nigar Khanum, a princess of Moghulistan. Her younger brother, Babur, was born five years after her birth in 1483, and went on to become the founder of the Mughal Empire of India as well as its first emperor.

Khanzada's paternal grandfather was Abu Sa'id Mirza of the Timurid Empire, while her maternal grandfather was Yunus Khan, the Great Khan of Moghulistan. Khanzada was thus, a descendant of Genghis Khan from her maternal side and a descendant of Timur from her paternal side.

== Marriages ==
=== Shaybani Khan Uzbek ===
In 1500–01, the conflict between Khanzada's brother, Babur, and the Uzbeks was at its most intense. For six months, Shaybani Khan Uzbek besieged Babur in Samarkand. None of Khanzada and Babur's powerful relatives, such as their paternal uncle, Sultan Husayn Mirza Bayqara, the ruler of Greater Khorasan, sent Babur help. At this time, Shaybani Khan sent a message to Babur, proposing that if Babur would marry his sister Khanzada Begum to him, there would be a lasting alliance between them. According to Khanzada's niece, Gulbadan Begum, "at length it had to be done, he gave the Begum to the Khan, and came out himself (from Samarkand) ... in this plight, unarmed, and relying on God, he went towards the land of Badakshan... and Kabul."

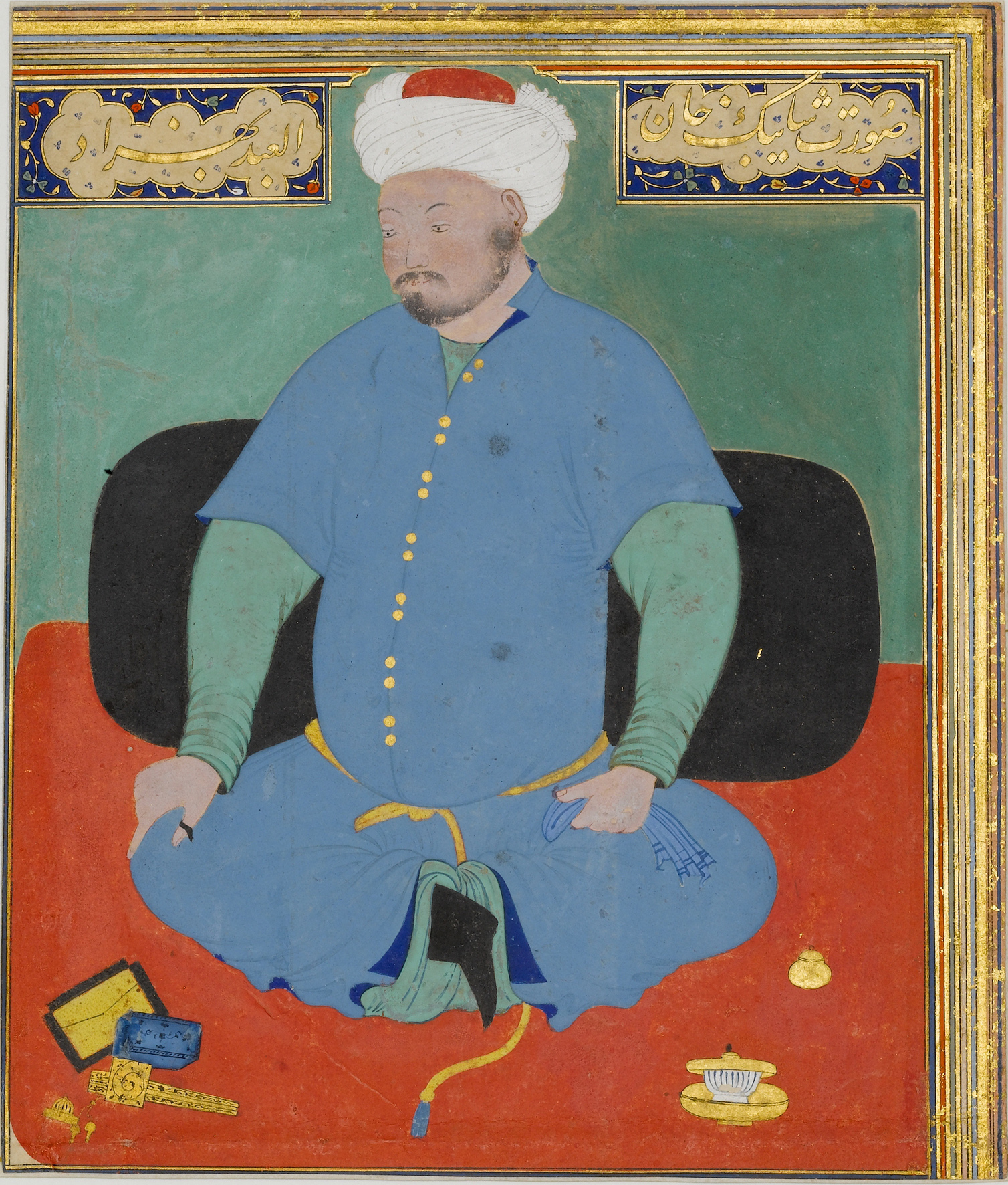
Shaybani Khan Uzbek, the Khan of the Uzbeks, and Khanzada's spouse

According to the Baburnama in 1500, Khanzada's brother Babur had to abandon Samarkand, after a five-month siege by Muhammad Shaybani Khan, at this time Khanzada fell to Shaybani Khan (as his share of the war captives). According to the Akbarnama, Henry Beveridge, writes that according to the Shaybani-nama, Khanzada's marriage with Shaybani Khan was a love-match. He also suggests the probability that "Babur has not mentioned the whole of the circumstances and that her [Khanzada] being left behind was a part of Babur's agreement with Shaybani."

In July 1500, Khanzada's maternal aunt, Mihr Nigar Khanum, had been captured by Shaybani Khan and forcibly married to him, 'as part of the spoils'. She was divorced when Shaybani resolved to marry her Timurid niece, Khanzada Begum, as it is unlawful in Islam for both aunt and niece to be wedded to the same man.

After their marriage, Khanzada and Shaybani had one child together, a son, Khurram, who died in his childhood. Shaybani later divorced Khanzada because she leaned towards her brother's side in disputed matters.

=== Mahdi Khwaja ===
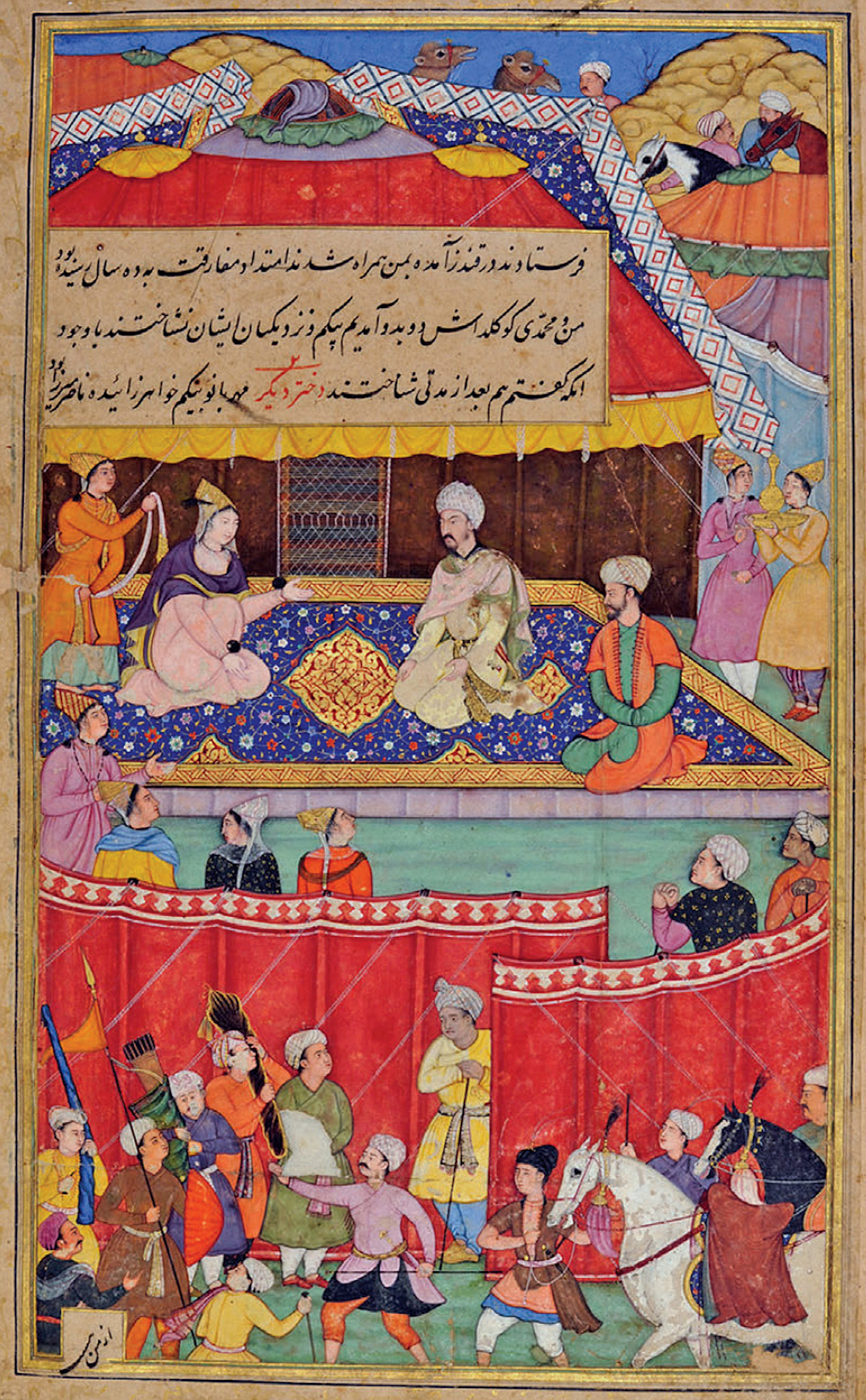
Reunion of Khanzada and Babur

In 1511, at the age of thirty-three, Khanzada was returned to Babur at Kunduz by Shah Ismail I (who had defeated Shaybani in the Battle of Marv), with an escort of soldiers. Along with Khanzada came an envoy of Shah Ismail offering friendship and a promise to consider military help under certain conditions. In return, Babur sent Wais Khan Mirza with gifts to the Court of Shah Ismail.

Khanzada's second marriage took place with Muhammad Mahdi Khwaja at an unknown date. Annette Beveridge states that it is possible that the marriage took place within no long time after her return. It is probable that Mahdi's joining of Babur and his marriage with Khanzada took place in the decade 1509–1519, of which no record is known to survive. Mahdi was with Babur in 1519 and is frequently mentioned subsequently.

== Issue ==
Khanzada apparently did not have any children after her son with Shaybani. She took charge of Mahdi's younger sister, Sultanam Begum, when she was two years old. Khanzada loved Sultanam immensely as though she were her own daughter. She reared her sister-in-law to become the wife of her nephew, Prince Hindal Mirza, who was the youngest son of Babur from his wife Dildar Begum.

Sultanam and Hindal married in 1537 and their wedding feast was arranged by Khanzada Begum. The feast, known as the 'Mystic Feast', was a grand affair being attended by innumerable imperial and royal guests as well as high-ranking court amirs. Gulbadan Begum states that such a wedding feast had not been organized previously for any other children of Babur. Mahdi Khwaja presented his brother-in-law, Hindal, with a large amount of dowry and Khanzada Begum also gave extravagant gifts.

== Death ==
Khanzada Begum died at Qabal-chak in September 1545 while she was accompanying her nephew, Humayun, who was on his way from Qandahar to meet his younger half-brother, Kamran Mirza. She had been suffering from fever for three days which resulted in her death on the fourth day. The doctor's remedies were of no avail. At first, her body was buried at Qabal-chak, but three months later her body was brought to Kabul and laid in the Gardens of Babur, at her brother's place of burial.

== Ancestry ==
Ancestors of Khanzada Begum

8. Muhammad Mirza
4. Abu Sa'id Mirza, Timurid Sultan
9. Shah Islam
2. Umar Shaikh Mirza II, King of Ferghana
5. Shah Sultana Begum
1. Khanzada Begum
12. Uwais Khan, Khan of Moghulistan
6. Yunus Khan, Khan of Moghulistan
13. Daulat Sultan Sakanj
3. Qutlugh Nigar Khanum
14. Shir Ali Haji Kunji Beg
7. Aisan Daulat Begum

== Popular culture ==
Khanzada Begum was portrayed by Drashti Dhami in the Hotstar Web series The Empire released on 27 August 2021

== Bibliography ==
- Begum, Gulbadan (1902). The History of Humayun (Humayun-Nama). Royal Asiatic Society. ISBN 8187570997.
