= Qutlugh Nigar Khanum =

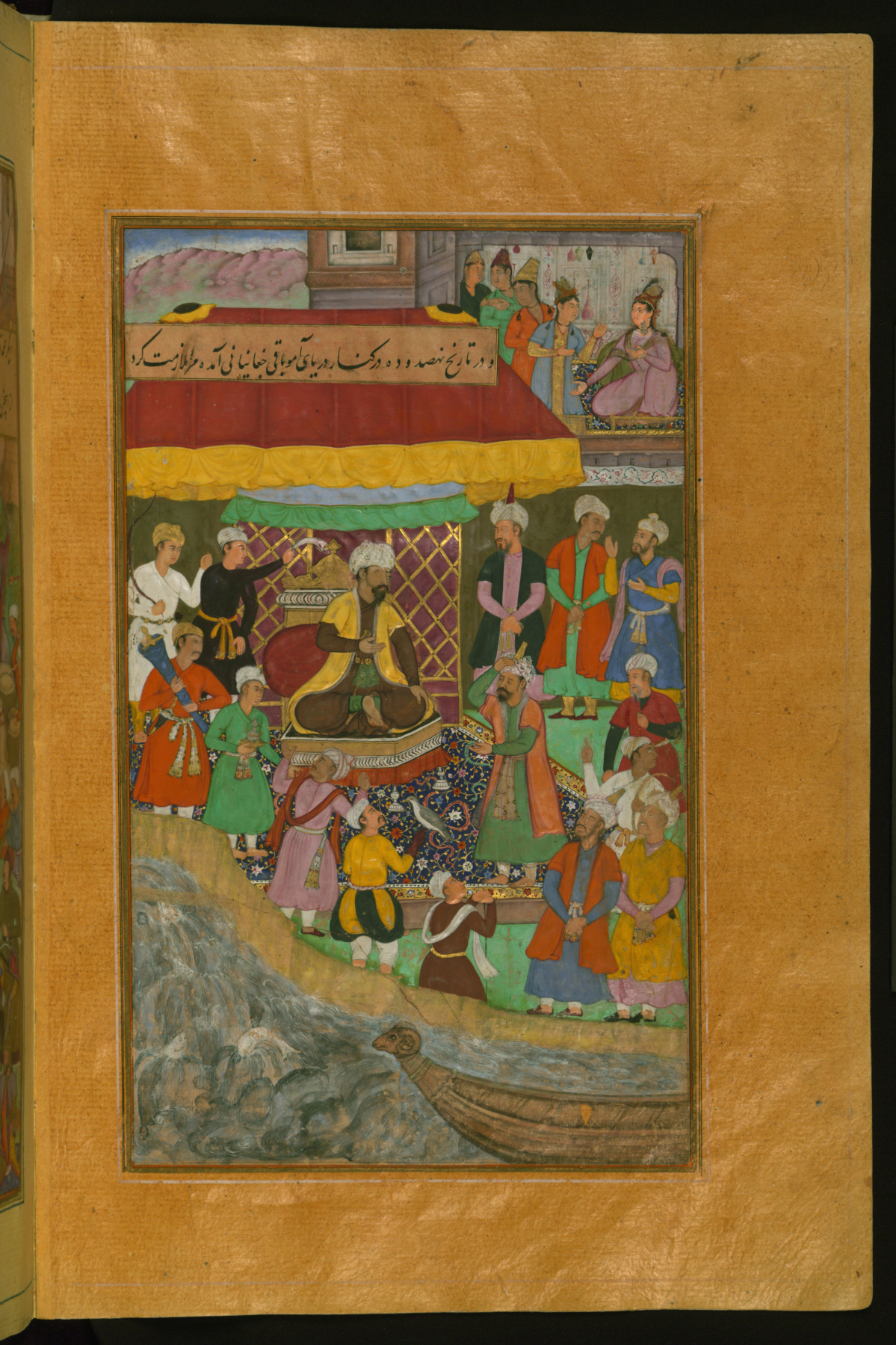
- Qutlugh portrayed top right accepting homage

Queen consort of Ferghana Valley
- Tenure: c. 1475 – 1492
- Died: 10 June 1505
- Spouse: Umar Shaikh Mirza II
- Issue: Khanzada Begum; Babur, Mughal emperor
Names
- Qutlugh Nigar
- House: House of Borjigin (by birth); House of Timur (by marriage)
- Father: Yunus Khan
- Mother: Aisan Daulat Begum
- Religion: Sunni Islam

Qutlugh Nigar Khanum (Chagatai and Persian: قتلغ نگار خانم, also spelled Kutlak Nigar Khanum; d. 1505) was the first wife and chief consort of Umar Shaikh Mirza II, the ruler of Ferghana Valley. She was a princess of Moghulistan by birth and was a daughter of Yunus Khan, the Great Khan of Moghulistan.

She was also the mother of Emperor Babur, the founder of the Mughal Empire of India.

== Family and lineage ==
Qutlugh Nigar Khanum was born as a princess of Moghulistan and was the second daughter of Yunus Khan, the Great Khan of Moghulistan, and his chief consort Aisan Daulat Begum. Her paternal grandfather was Uwais Khan, the Moghul Khan of Moghulistan and her father's predecessor.

Qutlugh was a direct descendant of Chenghiz Khan, the founder and Great Khan (Emperor) of the Mongol Empire through her father's side. Being the daughter of a Khan, Qutlugh held the title of "Khanum" ("daughter of a Khan or princess") by birth.

Two of Qutlugh's sisters became her sisters-in-law since her elder sister, Mihr Nigar Khanum, married Sultan Ahmed Mirza, the eldest son of Abu Sa'id Mirza. Her younger half-sister, Sultan Khanum, married Sultan Ahmed Mirza's successor, Sultan Mahmud Mirza.

== Marriage ==
Qutlugh married Prince Umar Shaikh, the fourth son of Abu Sa'id Mirza, the Emperor of the Timurid Empire in 1475. She was his first wife and chief consort. Before his death, her father-in-law had divided his empire between his sons and Umar was given to rule Ferghana Valley in today's Uzbekistan. Here, at Andizhan, she gave birth to Umar's eldest son, Prince Babur on 14 February 1483. Babur went on to become the founder of the Mughal Empire of India and was the first Mughal emperor.

Qutlugh also gave birth to Umar's eldest daughter, Princess Khanzada Begum, who was five years older than Babur and was born sometime in 1478. Qutlugh, being a Mongol princess, was well educated. With the untimely death of her husband, when her son Babur was only ten, Qutlugh and her mother Aisan Daulat Begum, raised him themselves. She accompanied her son during most of his guerrilla expeditions and throne-less times.

== Death ==
Qutlugh Nigar had fever for six days and died in June 1505, five or six months after Babur conquered Kabul. She, therefore, did not live to see her son become Mughal emperor. She was buried in New Year's Garden. Babur paid 1,000 coined misqal to his kinsmen, the owners of the garden, and laid her there.
