= Aisan Daulat Begum =

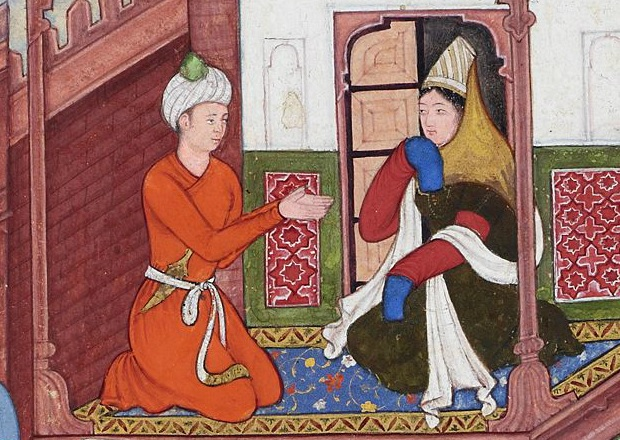
- Babur seeks his grandmother Aisan Daulat Begum's advice

Queen consort of Moghulistan
- Tenure: c. 1456 – 1487
- Died: 1505
- Spouse: Yunus Khan
- Issue: Mihr Nigar Khanum; Qutlugh Nigar Khanum; Khub Nigar Khanum
Names
- Aisan Daulat
- House: Borjigin (by marriage)
- Father: Shir Ali Haji Kunji Beg
- Religion: Islam

Aisan Daulat Begum (died June, 1505, other spellings Ehsan Daulat, Isan Daulat, Ësan Dawlat) was the first wife and chief consort of Yunus Khan of Moghulistan. She was the mother of Qutlugh Nigar Khanum, and hence the grandmother of the first Mughal emperor, Babur. During the reign of her grandson, she functioned as his de facto regent and advisor, from 1494 to 1505.

== Family ==
Aisan Daulat Begum was the daughter of the Sagharichi Tuman Begs, a subdivision of the Kunchi Mughals. Her father was a powerful tribal chief, Mir Sher Ali Haji Kunji (Qunchin) Beg. She had many brothers, of whom three, Shiram Beg, Mazid Beg, and Ali Dost Beg, took leading parts in Babur's affairs.

== Marriage ==
In 1456 Abu Sa'id Mirza, who had become the ruler of Transoxiana, sent for Yunus Khan. Abu Sa'id had become annoyed with the frequent raids that the Moghuls under Esen Buqa made into his territory. He raised Yunus to the khanship and sent him with an army to Moghulistan to oppose his brother. Yunus Khan quickly gained the support of several amirs and married Aisan Daulat Begum. Aisan Daulat Begum played an important part in contemporary politics right from her young days, when she was to be married. The Baburnama says that by marrying Aisan Daulat Begum, Yunus Khan along with Aisan Daulat were seated on a white felt. According to the Tureh or ancient Institutions of the Mughals, he was ordered and raised to khanship by the Sagharichi Tuman Begs who had attacked Moghulistan.

Aisan Daulat Begum shared the hardships for her husband's life for thirty years. Several times she fell into the hands of the enemy, but always returned safely.

By Aisan Daulat Begum, Yunus Khan had three daughters: Mihr Nigar Khanum, Qutlugh Nigar Khanum, and Khub Nigar Khanum. Her eldest daughter Mihr Nigar Khanum, whom Sultan Abu said Mirza took for his eldest son Sultan Ahmed Mirza. By Mirza She had neither a son nor a daughter. Her second daughter Quthlugh Nigar Khanum was married to Umar Shaikh Mirza II, the King of Ferghana Valley. She was the mother of Emperor Babur, the founder of the Mughal Empire of India as well as its first Emperor. Her third daughter was Khub Nigar Khanum, who was married to Muhammad Hussain Korkan Doghlet. He had by her one son and one daughter.

In Kashghar, in 1455–56, when her daughter Mihr Nigar Khanum was an infant at the breast, Aisan Daulat Begum was captured, but was returned in safety to her husband. In Tashkand in 1472–73, when Yunus Khan had gone to buy barley at a time of dearth in Moghalistan, Aisan Daulat Begum was again captured, but returned with honour to her husband. Aisan Daulat Begum shared the vicissitudes of her remarkable husband's remarkable career for some thirty years; nursed him through two years of paralytic helplessness til his death in 1487 at the age of seventy four, and survived him about eighteen years.

== Regent to Babur ==
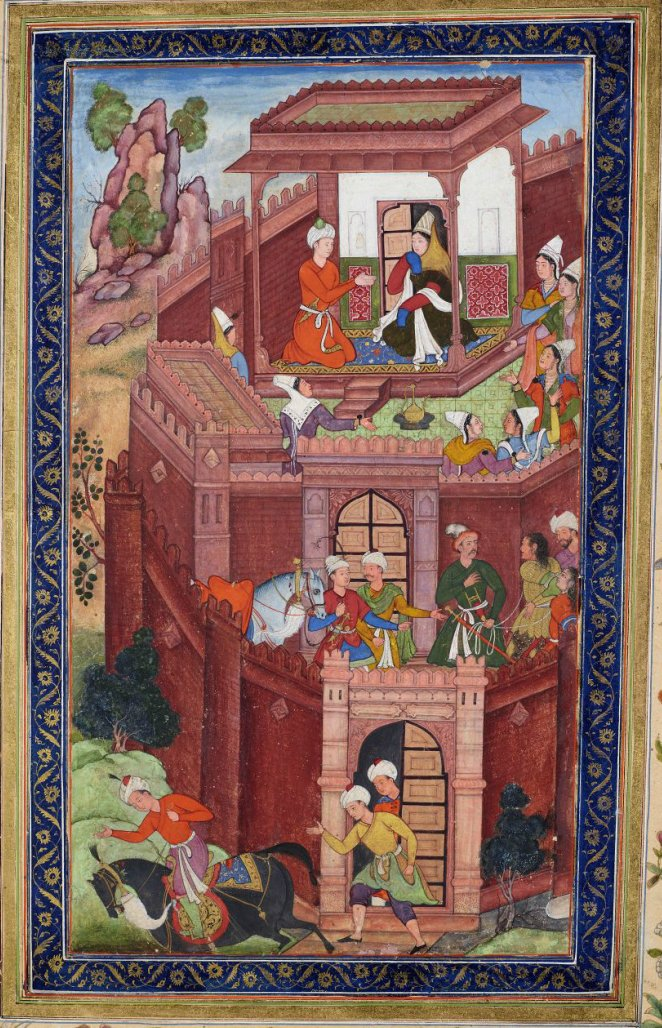
Babur seeks his grandmother Aisan Daulat Begum's advice

Aisan Daulat Begum contributed a lot to the making of Babur a disciplined and preserving man. She was virtually his counselor through his early struggle to hold Farghana. In 1494, when Umar Shaikh Mirza II died, Babur was an insecure boy of about of eleven years old. He found himself surrounded by enemies from his own families, who were keen on ousting him from his father's principality of Farghana. Right from that time, Aisan Daulat Begum was constantly by her grandson's side, guiding him and helping him overcome many a political crisis. In her hands lay the real administrative power and control of the state affairs and Babur always took her advice in these matters. Old officers were reshuffled and new officers were put in charge of the administration of many areas like Andijan, Aush, Akhsi and Marghinan.

Towards the end of 1494 Babur faced a political crisis when Hasan-i-Yaqub planned to dethrone Babur and raise his younger brother Jahangir Mirza to the throne. Apart from the support of his father Yaqub, Hasan also had the support of some disaffected nobles like Muhammad Baqir Beg, Sultan Muhammad Duldai, etc. But his plans were soon discovered and nobles loyal to Babur like Khwaja-i-Qazi, Qasim Quchin, and Ali Dost Taghai hastened to meet Aisan Daulat Begum to inform her about these developments. Immediately Aisan Daulat Begum took action against the conspirators. Babur was sent with some trusted people from the gate house of the outer fort towards the citadel to seize Hasan-i-Yaqub and his supporters. On reaching the place they got to know that Hasan was out on a hawking excursion. Babur's men fell upon Hasan's supporters and made them captives.

When Hasan learned about this, he fled to Samarkand to get the help of Sultan Mahmud Mirza. But, he changed his mind after reaching Kand-i-Badam, and decided to deliver a surprise attack on Akshi and convert it into a base for further attack on Andijan, where he could wait for the arrival for his ally Sultan Mahmud Mirza. Aisan Daulat Begum got to know of this plan too and once again she took the necessary plans to deal with it. An army was sent to deal with Hasan-i-Yaqub. Hasan-i-Yaqub came forward to meet it, but in the dark of the night a chance arrow from his own soldiers killed him. Thus, Babur was saved from the evil designs of Hasan-i-Yaqub, who had failed to understand the capabilities of Aisan Daulat Begum, the lady who was the real power behind Babur.

In Andijan in 1497–98, when the town was taken from her grandson Babur by his kinsfolk. She was sent after him in safety to Khojand, and from there went on to the protection of her third daughter's home in Kashghar. At Samarkand in 1500–1, when the town was taken by Shaibam. She remained behind when Babur left the place, and rejoined him in a few months with his "family, heavy baggage, and a few lean and hungry followers."

== Later life ==
Aisan Daulat Begum continued to guide and support her grandson in his days as a wanderer. It was she who had related to him stories of the military exploits of Timur and Genghis Khan, and these served as his preliminary lesson in the art of warfare. About his grandmother Aisan Daulat Begum, Babur in his own words said:

"Few among women will have been my grandmother's equal for judgement and counsel; she was very wise and farsighted and most affairs of mine were carried through under her advice."

News of her death reached Babur in Kabul early in June, 1505 during the forty days mourning for his mother.

== Bibliography ==
- Babur (2006). Babur Nama: Journal of Emperor Babur. Penguin Books India. ISBN 978-0-144-00149-1.
- Chandrababu, B. S.; Thilagavathi, L. (2009). Woman, Her History and Her Struggle for Emancipation. Bharathi Puthakalayam. ISBN 978-8-189-90997-0.
- Babur; Leyden, John; Erskine, William (1826). Memoirs of Zehir-ed-Din Muhammed Baber, Emperor of Hindustan. Longman.
- Begum, Gulbadan (1902). The History of Humayun (Humayun-Nama). Royal Asiatic Society.
- Eraly, Abraham (January 1, 2007). The Mughal World: Life in India's Last Golden Age. Penguin Books India. ISBN 978-0-143-10262-5.
- Jain, Simmi (2003). Encyclopaedia of Indian Women Through the Ages: The middle ages. Gyan Publishing House. ISBN 978-8-178-35173-5.
- Lal, Muni (1977). Babar: Life and Times. Vikas Publishing House. ISBN 978-0-706-90484-0.
- Mukherjee, Soma (2001). Royal Mughal Ladies and Their Contributions. Gyan Books. ISBN 978-8-121-20760-7.
- University of Allahabad (1974). University of Allahabad Studies, Volume 6.
