= Sultan Ahmed Mirza =

- Mirza, Padshah; Sultan of Samarkand and Bukhara
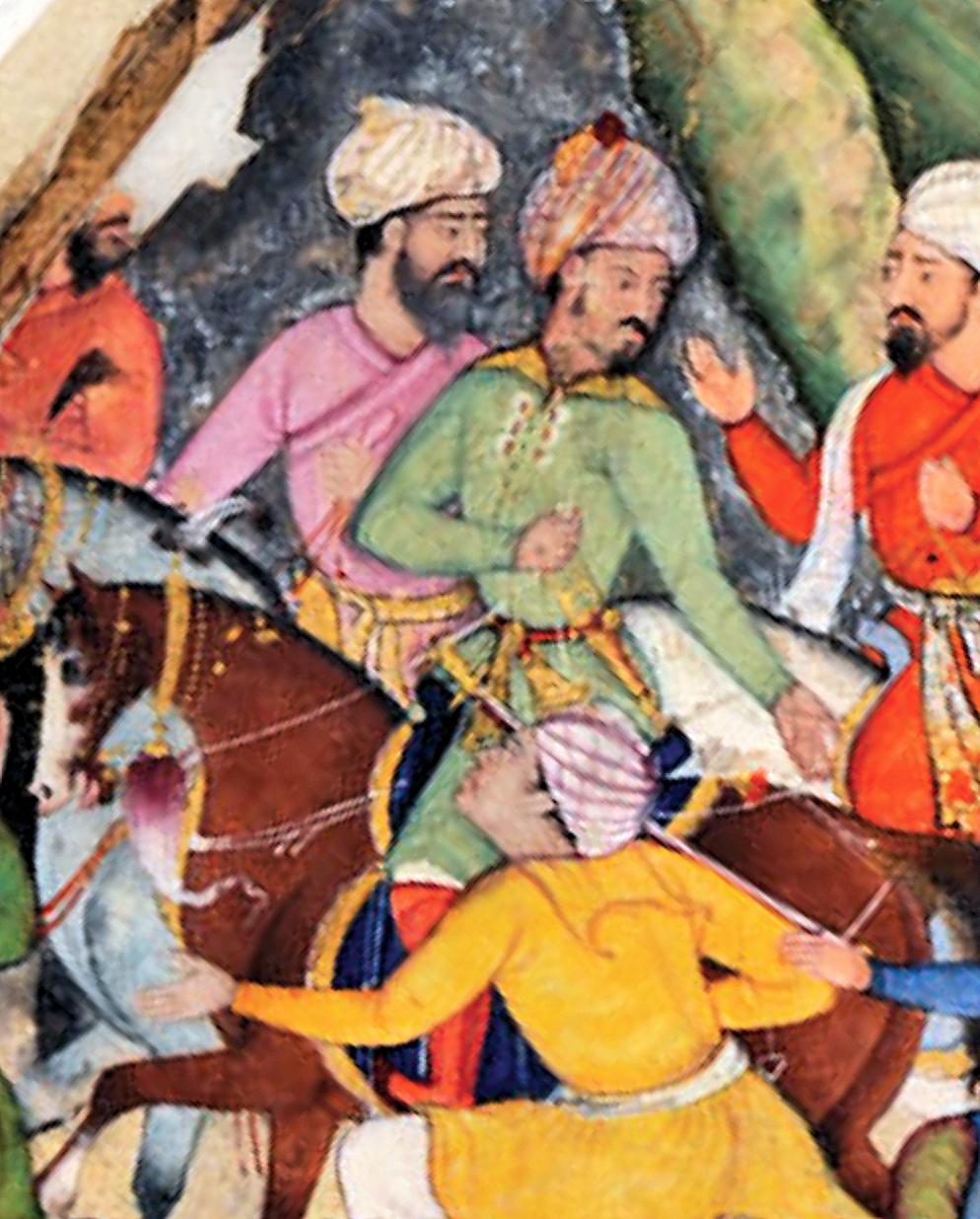
- A Mughal rendering of Sultan Ahmad Mirza crossing the bridge over the Qaba stream, in 1493-94. Baburnama of 1598, Folio 16a

Ruler of the Timurid Empire
- Reign: 1469–1494
- Predecessor: Sultan Abu Sa'id Mirza
- Successor: Sultan Mahmud Mirza
- Born: 1451; Samarkand
- Died: 1494 (aged 42–43)
- Spouse: Mihr Nigar Khanum; Tarkhan Begum; Qataq Begum; Khanzada Begum Tirmizi; Latif Begum; Habiba Sultan Begum Arghun
- Issue: Rabia Sultan Begum; Salika Sultan Begum; Aisha Sultan Begum; Sultanum Begum; Masuma Sultan Begum
Names
- Sultan Ahmad Mirza
- Dynasty: Timurid
- Father: Abu Sa'id Mirza
- Mother: Malika Sultan Begum
- Religion: Sunni Islam

Sultan Ahmed Mirza (Persian: سلطان احمد میرزا) was the eldest son of Abu Sa'id Mirza on whose death he became the Timurid ruler of Samarkand and Bukhara from 1469 until 1494. During his rule, he successfully repelled at least one invasion attempt by the Qara Qoyunlu, and failed in an attempt to conquer Khurasan from its ruler Sultan Husayn Mirza Bayqara. He was embroiled in the Timurid Civil Wars with his brothers Umar Shaikh Mirza II and Sultan Mahmud Mirza. He died while returning from his Ferghana expedition against Babur, the twelve-year-old son and successor of Umar Shaikh Mirza II. As he had no male heir, he was succeeded by his brother, Sultan Mahmud Mirza.

== Family ==
Consorts

Ahmed had six consorts:

- Mihr Nigar Khanum, daughter of Yunus Khan of Moghulistan and Aisan Daulat Begum
- Terkhan Begum, of the family of Terkhans
- Qatak/Qutaq Begum, foster sister of Terkhan Begum
- Khanzada Begum, sprung of the khans of Termez
- Latif Begum, daughter of Ahmed Haji Beg
- Habiba Sultan Begum, daughter of Sultan Arghun

Sons

Two sons who died in infancy - mothers unknown

Daughters

Ahmed had five daughters, four of them born to Qatak Begum, two of whom Babur married:

- Rabia Sultan Begum known as Karaguz Begum - with Qatak Begum, married firstly to Sultan Mahmud Khan, married secondly to Jani Beg Sultan Uzbek
- Salika Sultan Begum known as Ak Begum - with Qatak Begum, married to Sultan Masud Mirza, son of Sultan Mahmud Mirza
- Aisha Sultan Begum - with Qatak Begum, married to Babur
- Sultanum Begum - with Qatak Begum, married firstly to Sultan Ali Mirza, son of Sultan Mahmud Mirza, secondly to Temur Sultan, son of Muhammad Shaybani, married thirdly to Mehdi Sultan
- Masuma Sultan Begum - with Habiba Sultan Begum, married to Babur

Sultan Ahmed Mirza Timurid dynasty
Preceded by Abu Sa'id Mirza	Timurid Empire (in Samarkand); 1469-1494	Succeeded by Sultan Mahmud Mirza
