= Umar Shaikh Mirza II =

Timurid ruler of Fergana from 1469 to 1494

Umar Shaikh Mirza II عمر شیخ میرزا دوم
- Mirza; Padshah
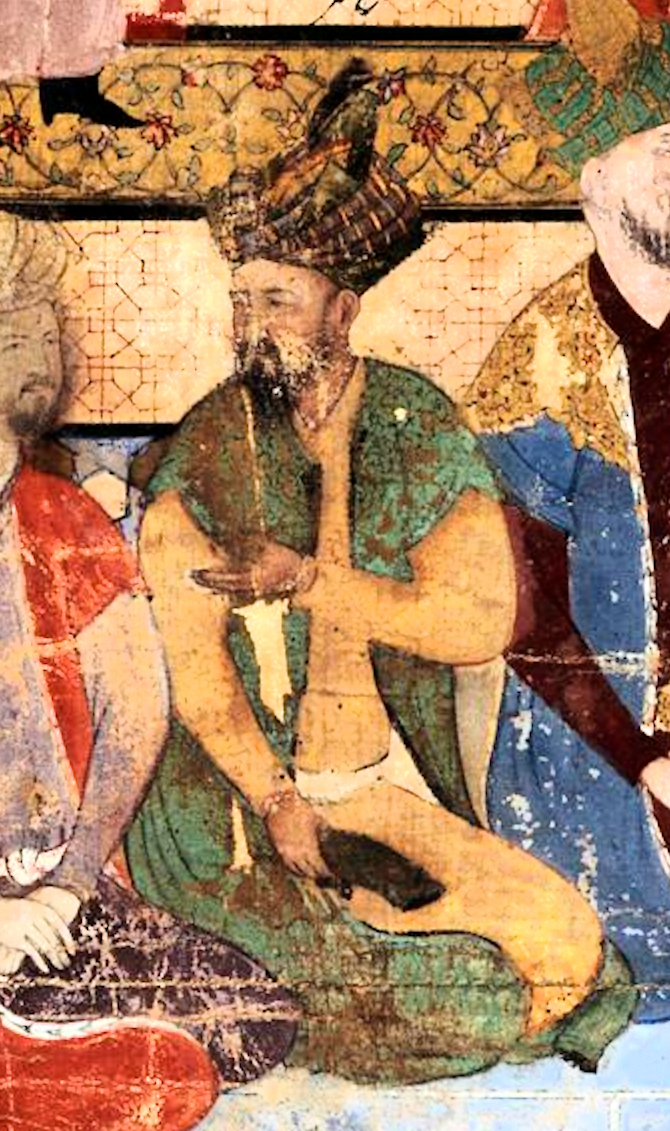
- Umar Shayk Mirza from the Princes of the House of Timur, attributed to Abd al-Samad, c. 1550–55

Ruler of Ferghana
- Reign: 8 February 1469 – 10 June 1494
- Predecessor: Abu Sa'id Mirza
- Successor: Babur
- Born: c. 1456; Samarkand; Timurid Empire (Present day Uzbekistan)
- Died: 10 June 1494 (aged 37–38); Ferghana; Timurid Empire (Present day Uzbekistan)
- Burial: 10–11 June 1494; Ferghana (Present day Uzbekistan)
- Spouse: Qutlugh Nigar Khanum (m.1475); Ulus Agha; Fatma Sultan Agha; Makhdum Sultan Begum; Umid Aghacha; Yun Sultan Aghacha; Agha Sultan Aghacha
- Issue: Khanzada Begum; Babur; Jahangir Mirza; Nasir Mirza; Mihr Banu Begum; Shahr Banu Begum; Yadgar Sultan Begum; Rukaiya Sultan Begum, Fatima bano begum
Names
- Umar Shaikh Mirza bin Abu Sa'id Mirza
- House: Timurid dynasty
- Father: Abu Sa'id Mirza
- Mother: Shah Sultan Begum
- Religion: Sunni Islam

Umar Shaikh Mirza II (Persian: عمر شیخ میرزا دوم; 1456–1494) was the Timurid ruler of the Fergana Valley. He was the fourth son of Abu Sa'id Mirza, the ruler of the Timurid Empire in what is now Kazakhstan, Uzbekistan, Afghanistan, Tajikistan and eastern Iran.

His first wife and chief consort was Qutlugh Nigar Khanum, a princess of the Chagatai Khanate and daughter of Yunus Khan of Moghulistan. Umar Shaikh had two other wives and had three sons and five daughters from his wives. His eldest son was Babur Mirza from his wife Qutlugh Nigar Khanum. His sons from this other two wives were Jahangir Mirza II and Nasir Mirza. His eldest son Babur Mirza founded the Mughal Empire in 1526 and was the first Mughal Emperor of India.

Umar Shaikh died in a freak accident in Aksi fort, Fergana, on 10 June 1494. It occurred when he was in his dovecote, which was built at the edge of the building, collapsed, thus making eleven-year-old Babur the ruler of Fergana.

His son Babur describes him as a devout Muslim who never neglected the 5 daily prayers.

== Family ==
=== His mother ===
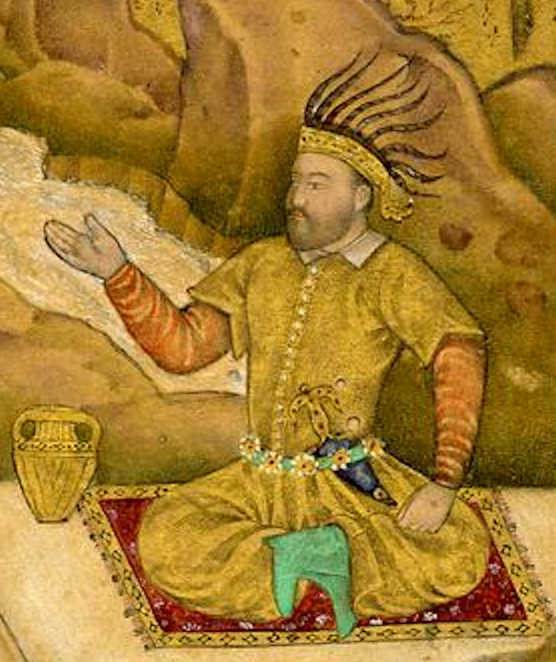
Umar Shaikh Mirza II dispensing justice, c. 1630, British Museum (1920,0917,0.13.42).

Umar Shaikh's mother was not explicitly named in any historical sources, including the Baburnama, his son Babur's autobiography. This was somewhat unusual, as Babur provided the maternal ancestry for many of his prominent relatives. However, Babur did refer multiple times to a certain Shah Sultan Begum (d. 1501) in a way that suggested she was Umar Shaikh's mother. This identification is one that is used by historians.

Shah Sultan Begum's own background was never stated. However, Khwand Amir, the vizier of Babur's uncle Sultan Mahmud, referred to Umar Shaikh as "the own younger brother" of Mahmud and Sultan Ahmed. If this wording were interpreted to say that they were full brothers, this would mean that Shah Sultan Begum was mother to all three rulers, and thus the daughter of Aurdu-Bugha Tarkhan Arghun, who is known to have been Ahmad and Mahmud's maternal grandfather.

=== Consorts ===
He had a total of seven consorts:

- Qutlugh Nigar Khanum (m.1475), daughter of Yunus Khan of Moghulistan and Aisan Daulat Begum;
- Ulus Agha (div.), daughter of Khwaja Hussein Beg;
- Fatima Sultan Agha, daughter of one of the begs of Mogul Tumans;
- Makhdum Sultan Begum, known as Karaguz Begum;
- Umid Aghacha, a concubine who died before Mirza;
- Yun Sultan Aghacha, a Moghul concubine;
- Agha Sultan Aghacha, another concubine;

=== Children ===
Sons

He had three sons:

- Babur - with Qutlugh Nigar Khanum;
- Jahangir Mirza II (1485 - 1508) - with Fatima Sultan Agha;
- Nasir Mirza (1487 - 1515) - with Umid Aghacha

Daughters

He had six daughters:

- A stillborn daughter - with Ulus Agha;
- Khanzada Begum (1478 - 1545) - with Qutlugh Nigar Khanum;
- Mihr Banu Begum (born 1481) - with Umid Aghacha;
- Shahr Banu Begum (1491 - 1542) - with Umid Aghacha, married to Junaid Barlas;
- Yadgar Sultan Begum (born 1494) - with Agha Sultan Aghacha, married to Abdul Latif Sultan, son of Hamza Sultan;
- Rukaiya Sultan Begum (1494 - 1528) - with Makhdum Sultan Begum, married to Jani Beg Sultan

=== Death ===
Umar died on 10 June 1494 at age 37 after the building which he was in collapsed. He was succeeded by his son, Babur.
