= Siege of Samarkand (1490s) =

- Part of Timurid Civil Wars
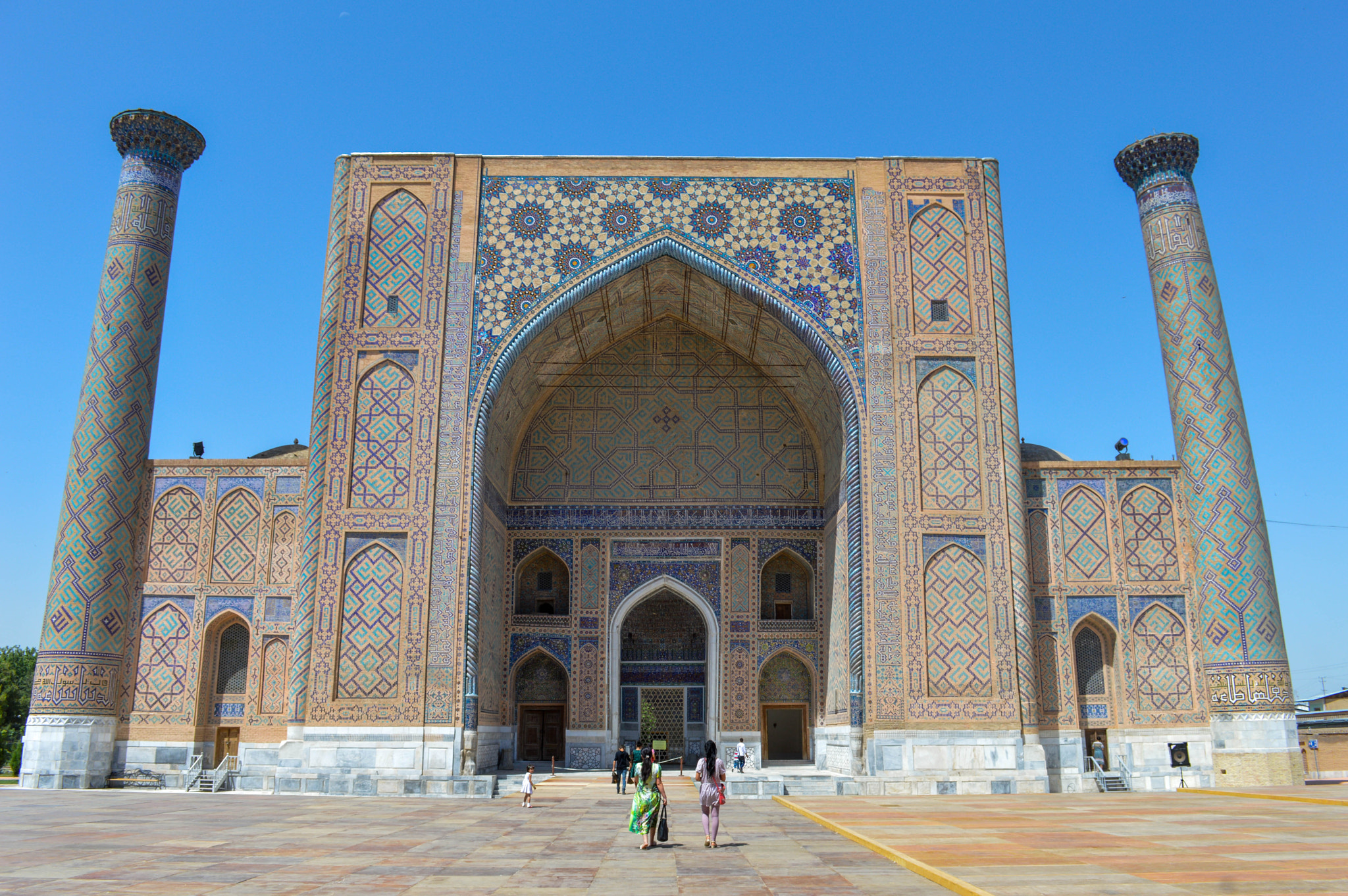
- Ulug-Bek Madrasa in Samarkand
Date	1494 & 1496
Location	Samarkand, Uzbekistan
Result	Samarkand victory

Belligerents
Timurids of Ferghana; Timurids of Bukhara; Timurids of Hissar	Timurids of Samarkand

Commanders and leaders
Zahir-ud-din Muhammad Babur; Sultan Ali Mirza; Sultan Masud Mirza	Sultan Baysonqor Mirza

The sieges of Samarkand (1494-1496) were two failed sieges of Samarkand during the chaotic years of civil war that preceded the fall of the Timurid Empire in 1501.

== Prelude ==
After the death of King Abu Sa'id Mirza in 1469, the great-grandson of Amir Timur Beg Gurkani (Taimur Lung), his much reduced Timurid Empire was divided among four of his sons namely;

- Umar Shaikh Mirza II (1456–1494), King of Ferghana
- Sultan Ahmed Mirza (1451–1494), King of Samarkand, Bukhara & Hissar
- Sultan Mahmud Mirza (1453-1495), King of Balkh
- Ulugh Beg Mirza II (?-1502), King of Kabul

A civil war between two brothers Umar Shaikh Mirza II (father of Babur), King of Ferghana and Sultan Ahmed Mirza, King of Samarkand and Bukhara was being fought in 1492 when Umar Shaikh died of natural causes leaving his son, the 12-year-old Babur in charge of his Kingdom. Ahmed Mirza, Babur's uncle wasted no time in attacking Babur's Kingdom but failed in his attempt. Ahmed Mirza later also died of natural causes without a son.
After Sultan Ahmed Mirza's death, his other Sultan Mahmud Mirza moved to Samarkand and reigned there for some five or six months, reportedly attempting to regulate the collection of taxes and strengthen his army, but also died. With the deaths of Sultan Ahmed Mirza, Sultan Mahmud Mirza and Umar Shaikh Mirza II, all occurring during the space of a year, civil strife between the next generation intensified.

== 1494 siege ==
The richest amirs tried to make use of the child Timurid princes, preferring to enthrone the weakest of them.
The deceased last Sultan of Samarkand, Sultan Mahmud Mirza, had 3 sons : Sultan Masud Mirza who became the ruler of Hissar, Sultan Ali Mirza (born 1479) who became the ruler of Bukhara, but the young Timurid Sultan Baysonqor Mirza (born 1477) came to power in Samarkand, which roused the governors of other provinces.
Sultan Ali Mirza left Bukhara on a campaign against his brother in Samarkand, but the inhabitants of the city put up a fierce resistance. These events and the confusion and anarchy with which they were attended in the kingdom of Samarkand did not escape the observation of their cousin Babur who resolved to try his fortune two years later.

== 1496 siege ==
In 1496, the 15-year-old Babur marched to attack Samarkand. At the same moment and induced by the same motives, Sultan Masud Mirza, the older brother of Sultan Ali Mirza and Baysonqor Mirza, was on his way to besiege the city. Thus that unfortunate city, unfortunate from its very wealth and former prosperity, saw itself beleaguered on three sides at the same time by the armies of three different potentates who acted without concert; Babur having advanced towards it from Andijan; Masud Mirza from Hissar and Sultan Ali from Bukhara.

Sultan Ali now proposed to Babur that they should enter into a treaty of alliance and mutual cooperation, to which Babur, accompanied by a limited number of followers, willingly agreed. But as the autumn was already drawing to a close and the winter was fast approaching, and as the country round Samarkand was exhausted by the presence of so many armies and altogether unable to furnish the requisite provisions for the troops all the invading princes, they were forced to withdraw to their own territories.
However, Babur and Sultan Ali decided that as soon as the winter season was over they would return and besiege the city again.

== Aftermath ==
Indeed, both princes returned to Samarkand in May 1497, and took the city after a siege of 7 months. The city remained in Timurid hands, but would be definitively lost to the invading Uzbeks under command of Muhammad Shaybani in 1501.
