= Battle of Ab Darrah Pass =

Part of Timurid-Uzbek wars

- Part of Timurid-Uzbek Wars
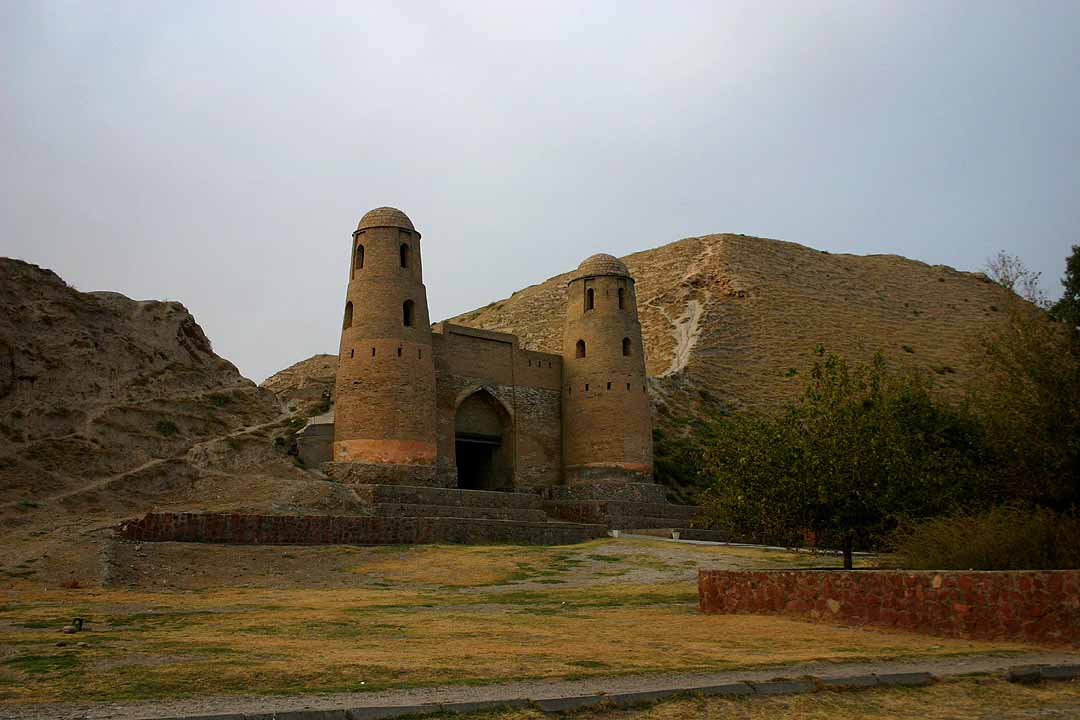
- Old castle in Hisar
Date	1511 CE
Location	Ab Darrah Pass, Afghanistan
Result	Timurid victory
Territorial changes	Babur regains Balkh, Badakhshan, Hisar Valley, Fergana Valley and Samarkand

Belligerents
Khanate of Bukhara	Timurids of Kabul

Commanders and leaders
Hamza Sultan (POW) (executed); Mahdi Sultan (POW) (executed); Ubaydullah Sultan Abul Ghazi; Timur Sultan; Jani Beg Sultan; Kuchum Khan Uzbek; Suyunjuk Sultan; Mahmud Sultan; Gujenjeh Khan; Amir Ya’qub; Jan Wafa Mirza; Fazil Tarkhan	Zahir-ud-din Muhammad Babur; Jahangir Mirza II; Nasir Mirza; Sultan Uways Khan Mirza; Mirza Haidar; Jan Muhammad Atgah

Battle of Ab Darrah Pass, or Battle of Pul-i Sangin, was the battle that took place in 1511, in the place called Ab Darrah (present-day Panjshir, Afghanistan) between Uzbeks and Babur of Timurids. The battle ended with the decisive Timurid victory which enabled Babur to regain Transoxiana and briefly reunite the whole of the ancestral part of the Timurid Empire. Such a decisive and significant battle is not mentioned in Babur’s Memoirs (Baburnama), in which there is a break from the year 1508 to the beginning of 1519.

Muhammad Shaybani, the Khan of the Uzbeks, had set up the Khanate of Bukhara and was so powerful and successful in his military exploits that he wrested Samarkand, Herat, and Bukhara from the Timurid dynasty. He captured Khurasan as well but by 1510, he found in Shah Ismail I, the founder of a new Safavid Persian Empire, a serious threat. He decided to confront this threat head on and marched towards Merv where his army was ambushed by the Persians. Some 17,000 Qizilbash ambushed and defeated a superior Uzbek force numbering 28,000, The Uzbek ruler, Muhammad Shaybani, was caught and killed.

When news of the defeat of their Khan reached the Uzbeks in Bukhara and Samarkand the result was shock and panic. Those Mughals who had supported Muhammad Shaybani and presently stationed in Khurasan left for Kunduz. News of these new developments arrived in Babur’s Kabul. He immediately decided to recover the kingdom of his forefathers.

== Initial movements ==
Babur marched towards Kunduz in the winter passing through the difficult Ab Darrah Pass. He spent the Eid ul-Fitr, Muslim festival marking the end of the month of Ramadan, near Bamyan. He reached Kunduz in January, 1511. As soon as his troops were rested and winter ended he marched towards the Fort of Qila Hissar Shadman, taking it and expelling two important Uzbek leaders: Hamza and Mahdi Sultan. While Babur lay at Kunduz an embassy arrived from Shah Ismail bringing the Emperor's sister Khanzada Begum with rich presents and tenders of amity. Shah Ismail reunited Babur with his sister, who had been imprisoned by and forced to marry the recently deceased Muhammad Shaybani. Ismail also provided Babur with a large wealth of luxury goods and military assistance, for which Babur reciprocated by adopting the dress and outward customs of the Persians. Over the following few years, Babur and Shah Ismail I would form a partnership in an attempt to take over parts of Mawarannahr (Transoxiana) in Central Asia.

Babur had already discovered that though the Uzbeks had suffered a severe defeat at the Battle of Marv, their power was yet unbroken. On the death of Shaybani the Uzbek chiefs assembled to elect a Supreme Khan in his place. Their choice according to the usages of the Uzbeks was decided by a mixed consideration of age and family. They did not raise to the dignity of Timur Sultan the son of Shaybani but Kuchum Khan Uzbek, a son of Abul-Khayr Khan and who was the eldest Sultan of the family. Timur Sultan the son of Shaybani ruled in Samarkand; Ubaydullah Khan, the son of Mahmud Sultan and nephew of Shaybani, possessed Bukhara; Jani Beg Sultan, a son of Shaybani’s uncle held Andijan while Kuchum probably occupied Turkistan, and his son, Suyunjuk Sultan occupied Tashkent. Shaybani was gone, but the veteran captains and the physical force of the Uzbeks still presented a formidable barrier to the progress of Babur. Though each chief was nearly independent in his own territories, all were ready to act in union when any assault was made from without against any one member of the confederacy.

As the Uzbeks had ascertained that Shah Ismail had conceded the possession of Mawarannahr to Babur, they no longer apprehended an attack from him in person and their whole force being now disposable, they took their measures accordingly. It was resolved that Kuchum Khan (not to be confused with Kuchum Khan of Siberian Khanate) and Suyunjuk Sultan should in concert with Jani Beg Sultan recover possession of Fergana that Ubaydullah Khan should remain at Karshi while Timur Sultan and other chiefs should assist Hamza and Mahdi Sultan in driving Babur out of Hissar. Nor were they slow in carrying the concerted measures into effect. When Babur reached Pul Sangin on the Surkhab he found that Hamza Sultan from Hissar had occupied it. He discovered also that the Uzbek army was far more numerous than he had supposed and commanded by chiefs of the first distinction and that to meet them in the field would be extremely dangerous. The Uzbeks on their part when informed of the inferiority of Babur's force passed the river lower down than Pul Sangin the stone bridge by swimming. Intelligence of this movement having reached him about afternoon prayers he instantly put his army in motion and marched for Ab Darrah where the passes in the hills are extremely narrow and steep. All that night and the succeeding day till noon he continued marching with the utmost celerity when he at length arrived at a position which the most experienced leaders considered to be very strong and there took his ground.

== Battle ==
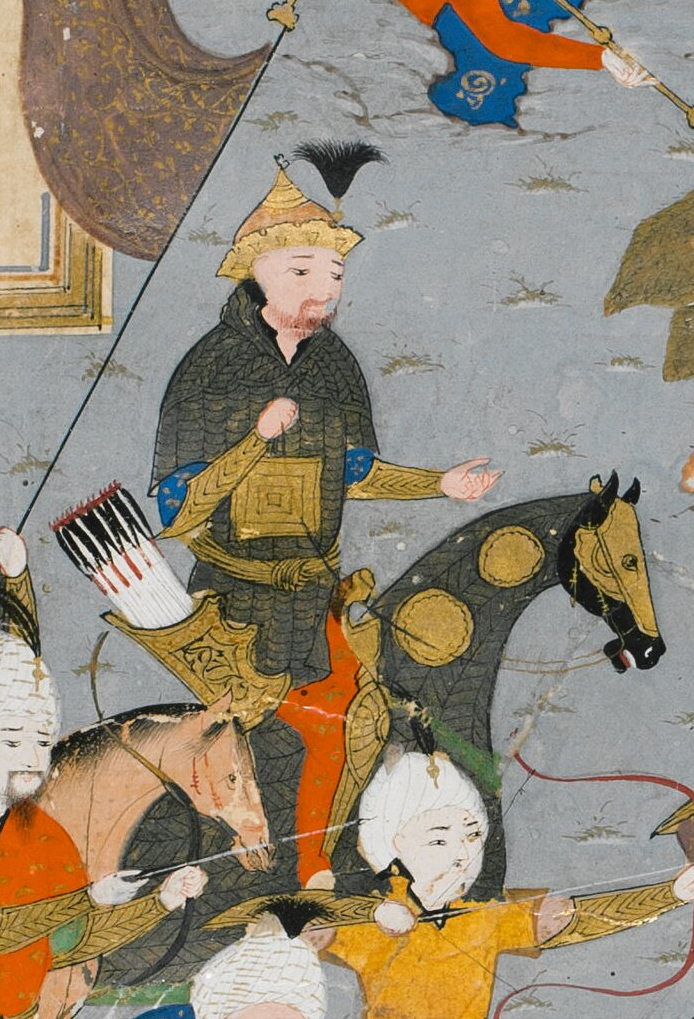
The Uzbek ruler Ubaidullah Khan on horse with weapons. 16th century miniature

Towards midnight news was brought that the Uzbeks were advancing in full force. The troops were instantly ordered to their posts and remained under arms till day break ready for action. About sunrise the advanced pickets reported that the enemy was in motion and preparing to attack. Babur rode to an eminence to reconnoiter. He saw that there was only one pass and that a narrow road by which the Uzbeks could attack the hillock on which he was posted. Close by this was another hillock divided from the first by a broad and deep ravine and to this hillock also there was only one road. After the Uzbeks had drawn out their ranks on the level ground below, they perceived that it was no easy task to mount the hill. Timur Sultan and several other Sultans with about 10,000 men separated from the main body and began to ascend the farther hill. Babur instantly dispatched Khan Mirza (named Sultan Uways Khan Mirza, youngest son of Sultan Mahmud Mirza and brother of Baysonqor Mirza and Masud Mirza) with a body of the best troops to oppose them. At the same moment his eye happened to light on a band of men who were standing by and he inquired who they were. He was informed that they were Mirza Haider's followers, being a party chiefly of Mughals who had been attached to Sultan Hussein Mirza Bayqara and who on escaping from Khurasan had now joined Babur. They arrived at a fortunate moment, Khan Mirza's men, after coming to their ground had been charged by the Uzbeks who bore down all before them and had nearly reached Khan Mirza himself. Haider's men under Jan Muhammad Atgah, as soon as they arrived, attacked them in front and the fugitives rallying returned to the fight and succeeded in driving back the Uzbeks. Haider's men took an Uzbek chief who was immediately carried before Babur. He received the offering with joy as a favorable omen and on the spot ordered the first prize of valor to be inscribed in Mirza Haider's name. Still, however, the contest continued to be maintained on both sides with desperate valor till the light began to fail. The violence of the battle had not reached Babur's position, the direct road to which was difficult, while it was not easy to go up or down from one place to another.

Late in the afternoon the men of note who were about Babur dismounted; At nightfall the Uzbeks found it impossible to remain in their advanced position for want of water which was three or four miles off, they therefore were obliged to retreat during the night in order to encamp near water. As soon as they began to make a retrograde movement, the foot soldiers and such as had dismounted raised a shout and rushed after them. The portion of their army that was opposed to Khan Mirza having observed Hamza Sultan and the main body in retreat were also eager to retire. As long as the two divisions remained facing each other neither could gain any advantage over the other but no sooner did the Uzbeks commence their retreat than Khan Mirza's men made a general charge and the Uzbeks at once took to flight. When the main body saw that division discomfited they too lost their firmness, fell into confusion, and were soon scattered in complete rout. It was now Isha prayers when Hamza Sultan and Mahdi Sultan were taken and brought before Babur and were executed. From night till morning were the fugitives pursued and from morning till night to the entrance of the Derbend Ahinein (the Iron Gate). The immediate consequence of this victory was the fall of Hissar, Tajikistan.

== Aftermath ==
Babur now collected the whole of his troops near Hissar. He was soon after joined by an additional body of auxiliaries sent by Shah Ismail under the command of Mustafa Ali and Shahrukh Sultan Moherdar, and numbers of men joined from the tribes around so that the army horse and foot amounted to 60,000. The Qizilbash force was under the command of Ahmed Sultan Safi who was related to the royal House of Persia, Ali Khan Istijlu and Shahrukh Khan Afshar of whom the two former had served with great reputation against the Ottoman Turks. Babur now with this powerful army advanced towards Karshi. The principal Uzbek chiefs had met at Samarkand; Ubaydullah Sultan, the chief of Bukhara had fortified himself in Karshi. Babur's ablest officers were against besieging Karshi, time they said, was valuable and if he pushed on and took possession of Bukhara, Karshi must fall of course. In this opinion, Babur concurred and he marched past it and encamped when his scouts reported that Ubaydullah Sultan had quitted Karshi and was in full route for Bukhara. Babur hastened on by forced marches and reached it before the Uzbeks, who finding themselves anticipated went on to Turkistan plundering the country by the way. The Uzbek Sultans who were in Samarkand being also filled with alarm in like manner took refuge in Turkistan and thus the country of Transoxiana was for a time cleared of the Uzbeks after they had held it about nine years.

Babur proceeded to Samarkand. At Samarkand he was met by the chiefs of the law, merchants, grandees and others.. He was proclaimed King at Samarkand in the beginning of October, 1511. He dismissed the Persian auxiliaries and then marched back to Khurasan. Gradually the remaining parts of Fergana were also retaken and Babur for the first time was able to reunite the whole of the ancestral part of the Timurid Empire. The Uzbeks were driven back to Turkistan; but only for 12 months.

== See also ==
- Baburnama - Autobiography of Mughal Emperor Babur
- Tarikh-i-Rashidi - A History of the Moghuls of Central Asia
