= List of emperors of the Mughal Empire =

Emperor of Hindustan
- پادشاهِ هندوستان
- Imperial
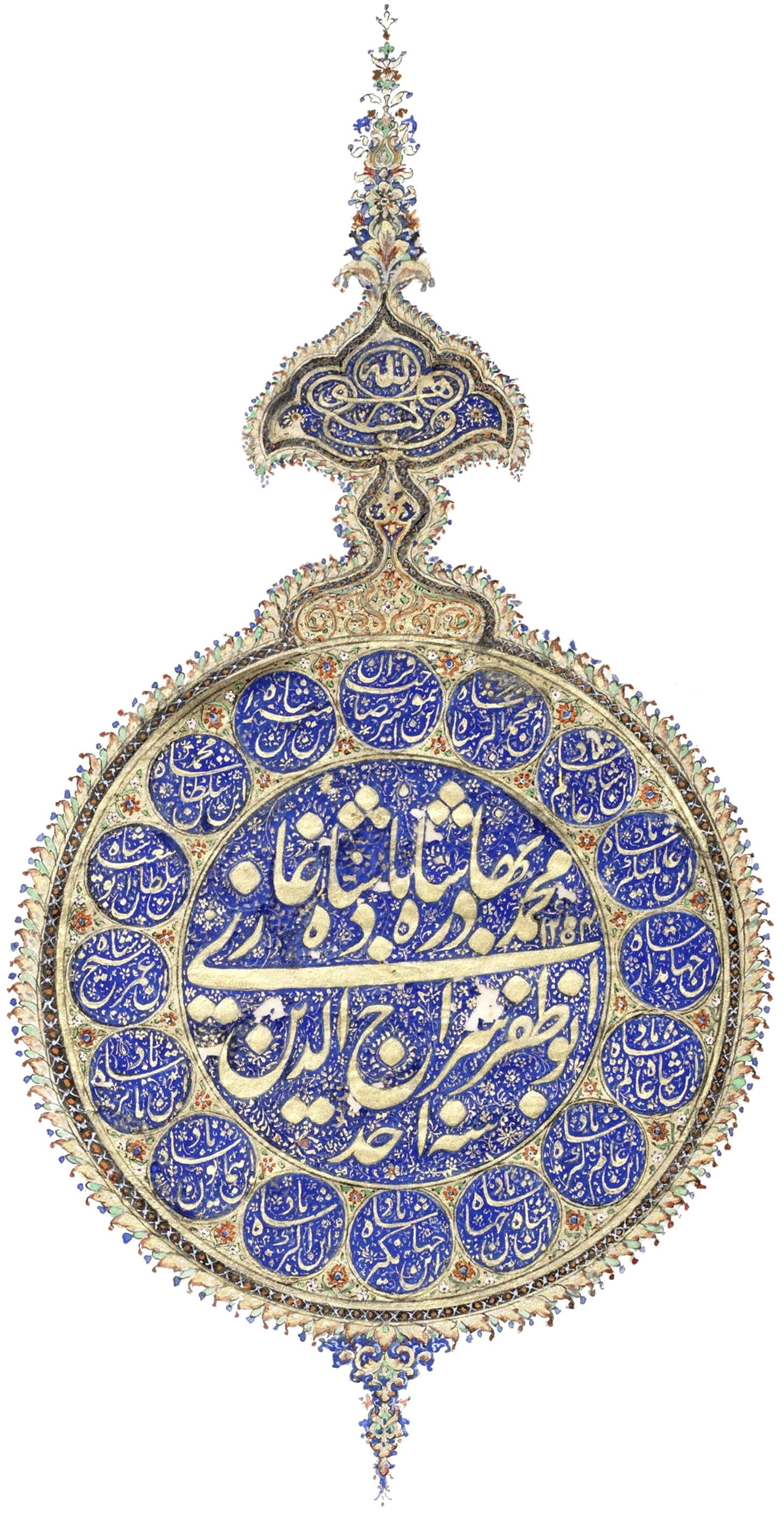
- Imperial seal of Bahadur Shah II (1837–1857)

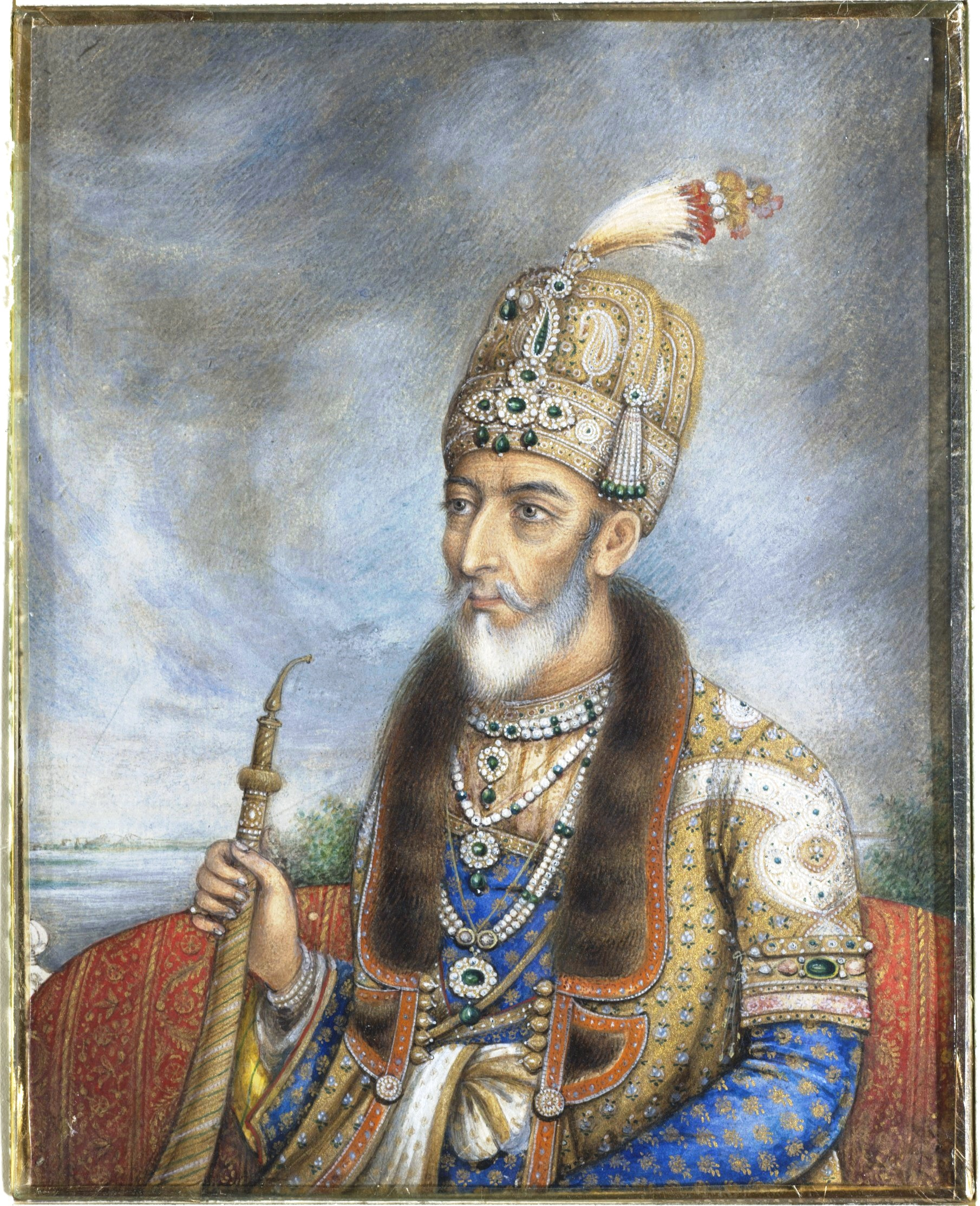
- Last to reign Bahadur Shah II; 28 September 1837 – 21 September 1857

Details
- Style: Jahah Panah; Alam Panah
- First monarch: Babur
- Last monarch: Bahadur Shah II
- Formed: 21 April 1526
- Abolished: 21 September 1857
- Residences: Agra Fort (1526–1648); Fatehpur Sikri (1571–1585); Lahore Fort (1586–1598); Red Fort (1639–1857)
- Appointer: Hereditary

The emperors of the Mughal Empire, who were all members of the Timurid dynasty, ruled the empire from its inception on 21 April 1526 to its dissolution on 21 September 1857. They were monarchs of the Mughal Empire in the Indian subcontinent, mainly encompassing the modern-day countries of India, Pakistan, Afghanistan, and Bangladesh. They ruled many parts of India from 1526, and by 1707 they ruled most of the subcontinent. Afterwards, their power declined rapidly, but nominally ruled territories until the Indian Rebellion of 1857.

The Mughal dynasty was founded by Babur (r. 1526–1530), a Timurid prince from the Fergana Valley (modern-day Uzbekistan). He was a direct descendant of both Timur and Genghis Khan.

The later Mughal emperors had significant Indian and Persian ancestry through marriage alliances as emperors were born to Indian and Persian princesses.

During the reign of 6th Mughal emperor Aurangzeb, the empire, as the world's largest economy and manufacturing power, worth over 25% of global GDP, controlled nearly all of the Indian subcontinent, extending from Dhaka in the east to Kabul in the west and from Kashmir in the north to the Kaveri River in the south.

Genealogy of the Mughal dynasty. Only principal offspring of each emperor are provided in the chart.

Its population at the time is estimated to be around 158,400,000 (a quarter of the world's total population), over a territory of more than 4 million square kilometres (1.5 million square miles). Mughal power rapidly dwindled during the 18th century and the last emperor, Bahadur Shah II, was deposed in 1857, with the establishment of the British Raj in India.

== Background ==
=== Babur and Humayun (1526–1556) ===
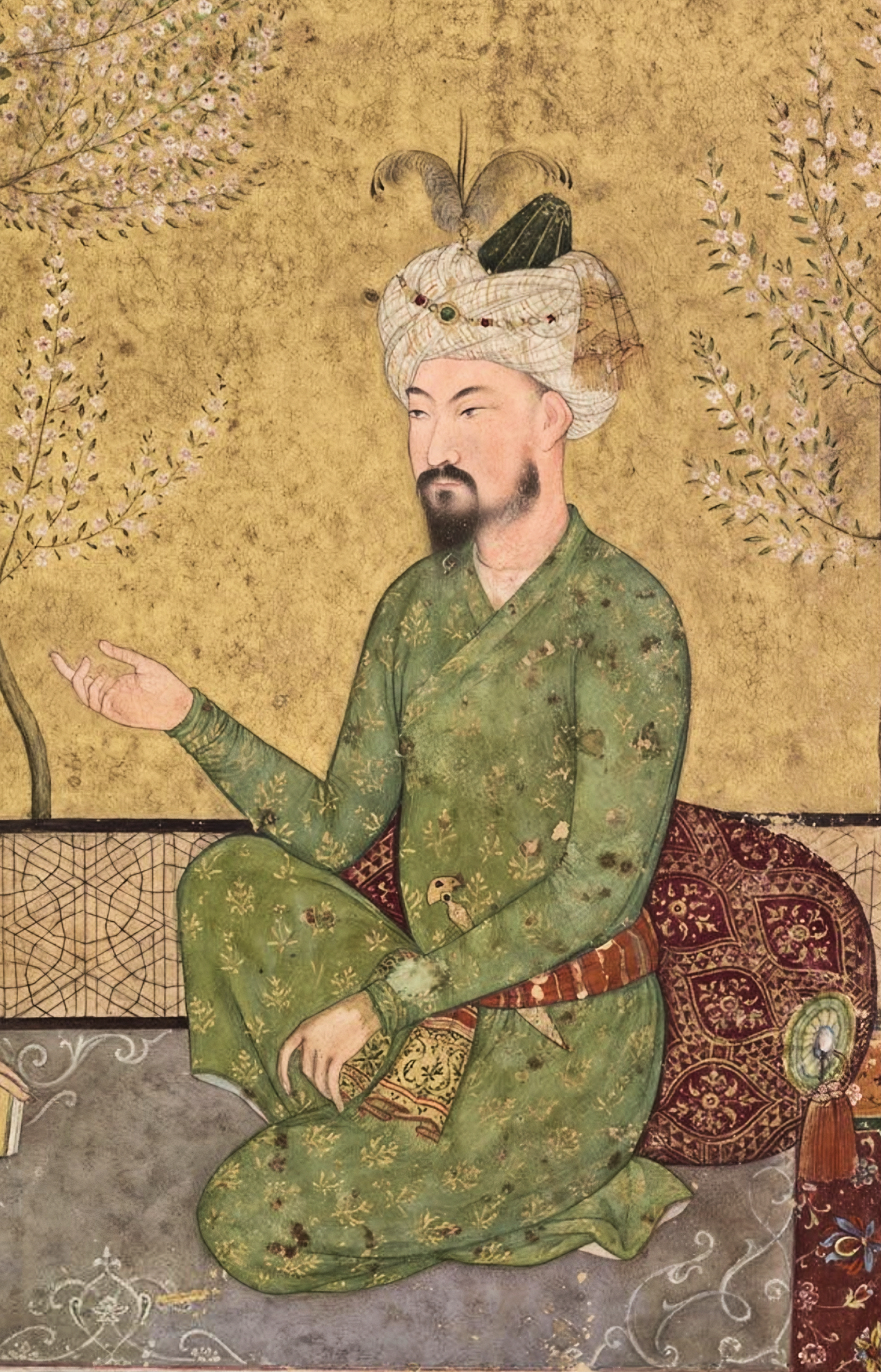
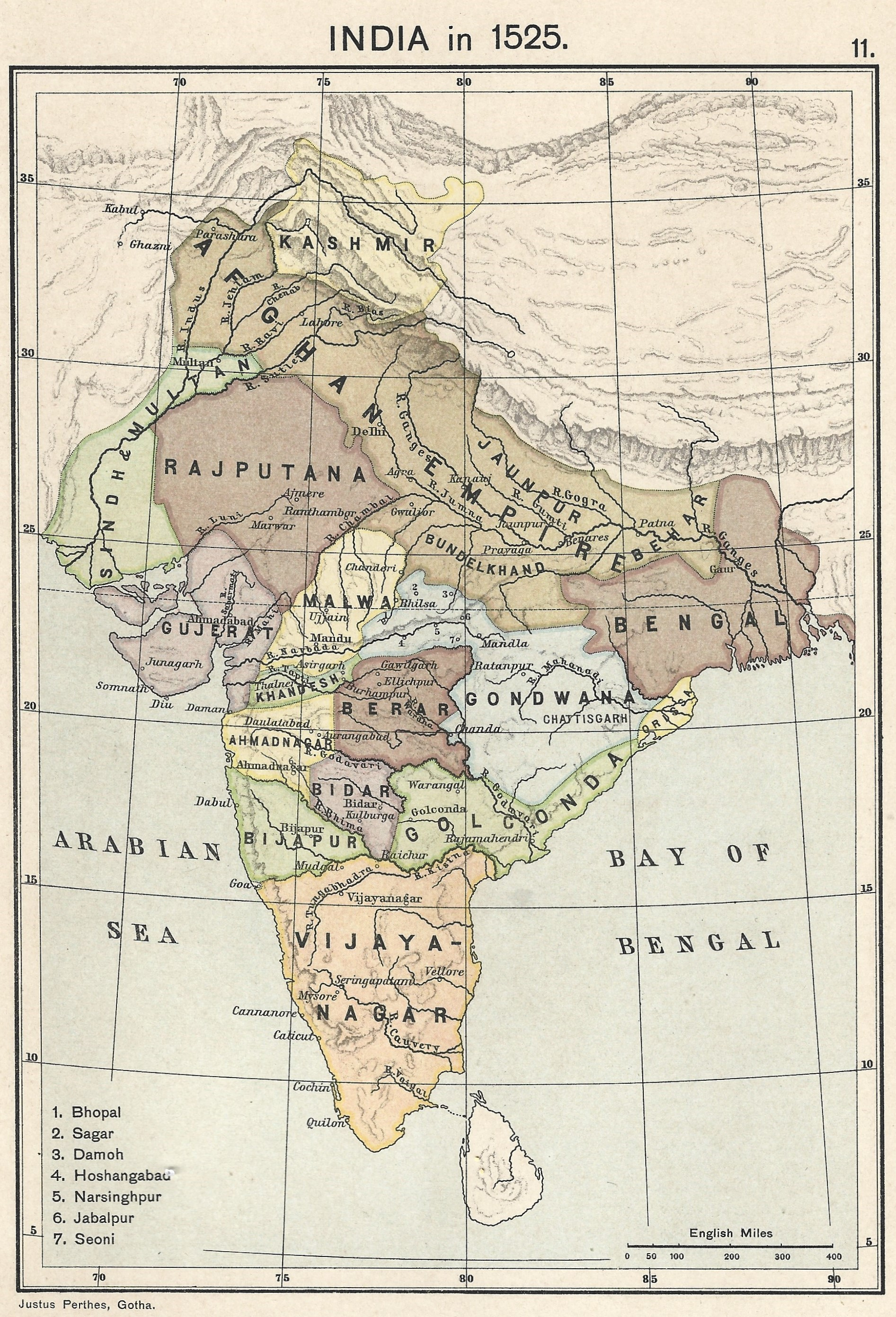
Portrait of Babur in the Late Shah Jahan Album, and map of India in 1525 just before the onset of Mughal rule

The Mughal Empire was founded by Babur (reigned 1526–1530), a Central Asian ruler who was descended from the Turco-Mongol conqueror Timur (the founder of the Timurid Empire) on his father's side, and from Genghis Khan on his mother's side. Paternally, Babur belonged to the Turkified Barlas tribe of Mongol origin. Ousted from his ancestral domains in Central Asia, Babur turned to India to satisfy his ambitions. He established himself in Kabul and then pushed steadily southward into India from Afghanistan through the Khyber Pass. Babur's forces defeated Ibrahim Lodi, Sultan of Delhi, in the First Battle of Panipat in 1526. Through his use of firearms and cannons, he was able to shatter Ibrahim's armies despite being at a numerical disadvantage, expanding his dominion up to the mid Indo-Gangetic Plain. After the battle, the centre of Mughal power shifted to Agra. The Battle of Khanwa fought near Agra in 1527 between Babur and Rana Sanga of Mewar was another decisive victory in the Mughal conquest of northern India.

The preoccupation with wars and military campaigns, however, did not allow the new emperor to consolidate the gains he had made in India. The instability of the empire became evident under his son, Humayun (reigned 1530–1556), who was forced into exile in Persia by the rebellious Sher Shah Suri (reigned 1540–1545). Humayun's exile in Persia established diplomatic ties between the Safavid and Mughal courts and led to increasing Persian cultural influence in the later restored Mughal Empire. Humayun's triumphant return from Persia in 1555 restored Mughal rule in some parts of India, but he died in an accident the next year.

=== Akbar to Aurangzeb (1556–1707) ===
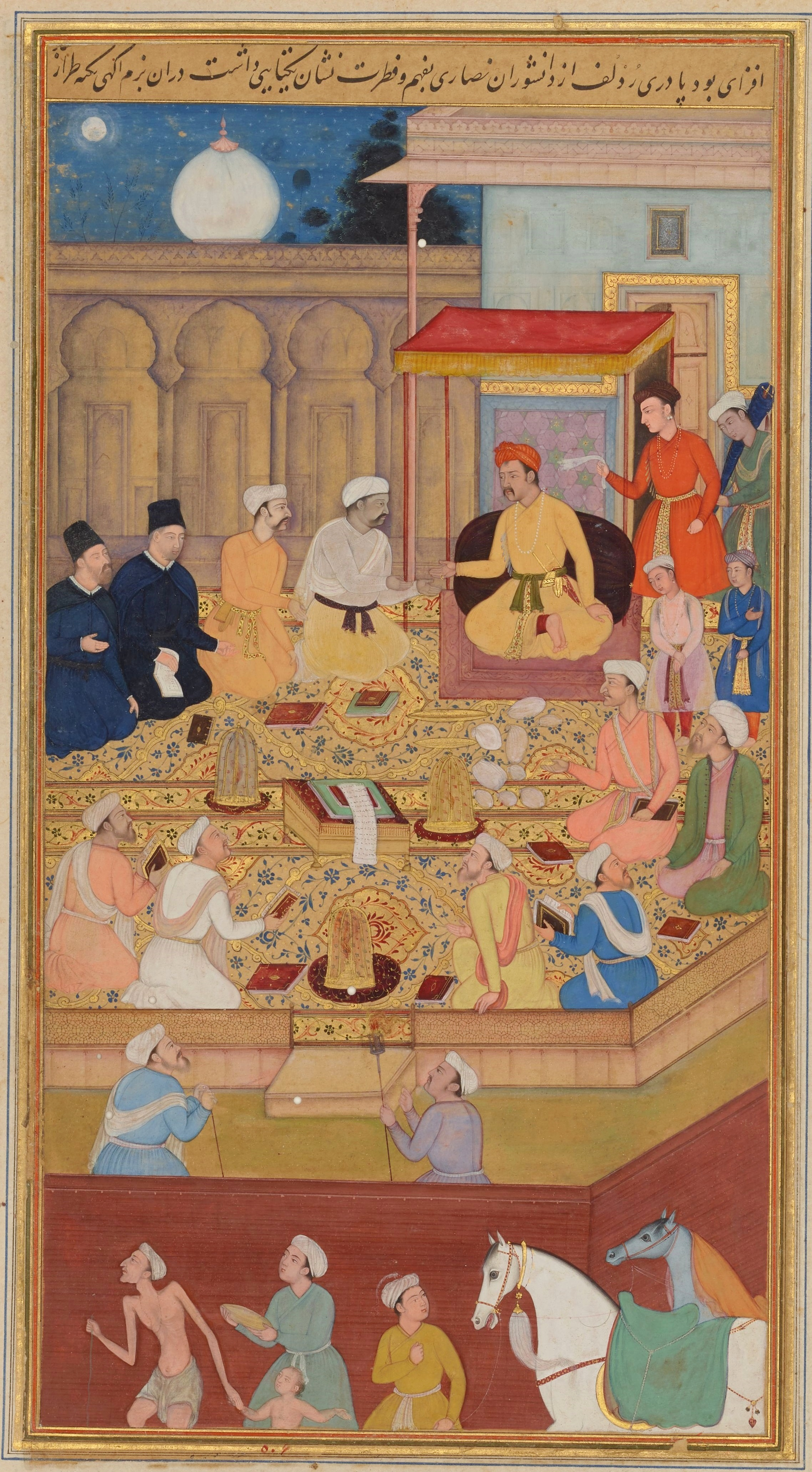
Akbar holds a religious assembly of different faiths in the Ibadat Khana in Fatehpur Sikri.

Akbar (reigned 1556–1605) was born Jalal-ud-din Muhammad in the Umarkot Fort, to Humayun and his wife Hamida Banu Begum, a Persian princess. Akbar succeeded to the throne under a regent, Bairam Khan, who helped consolidate the Mughal Empire in India. Through a series of wars, Akbar was able to extend the empire in all directions and controlled almost the entire Indian subcontinent north of the Godavari River. He created a new ruling elite loyal to him, implemented a modern administration, and encouraged cultural developments. He increased trade with European trading companies. India developed a strong and stable economy, leading to commercial expansion and economic development. Akbar allowed freedom of religion at his court and attempted to resolve socio-political and cultural differences in his empire by establishing a new religion, Din-i Ilahi, with strong characteristics of a ruler cult. He left his son an internally stable state, which was in the midst of its golden age, but before long signs of political weakness would emerge.

Jahangir (born Salim, reigned 1605–1627) was born to Akbar and his wife Mariam-uz-Zamani, an Indian princess. Salim was named after the Indian Sufi saint, Salim Chishti. He "was addicted to opium, neglected the affairs of the state, and came under the influence of rival court cliques". Jahangir distinguished himself from Akbar by making substantial efforts to gain the support of the Islamic religious establishment. One way he did this was by bestowing many more madad-i-ma'ash (tax-free personal land revenue grants given to religiously learned or spiritually worthy individuals) than Akbar had. In contrast to Akbar, Jahangir came into conflict with non-Muslim religious leaders, notably the Sikh guru Arjan, whose execution was the first of many conflicts between the Mughal Empire and the Sikh community.

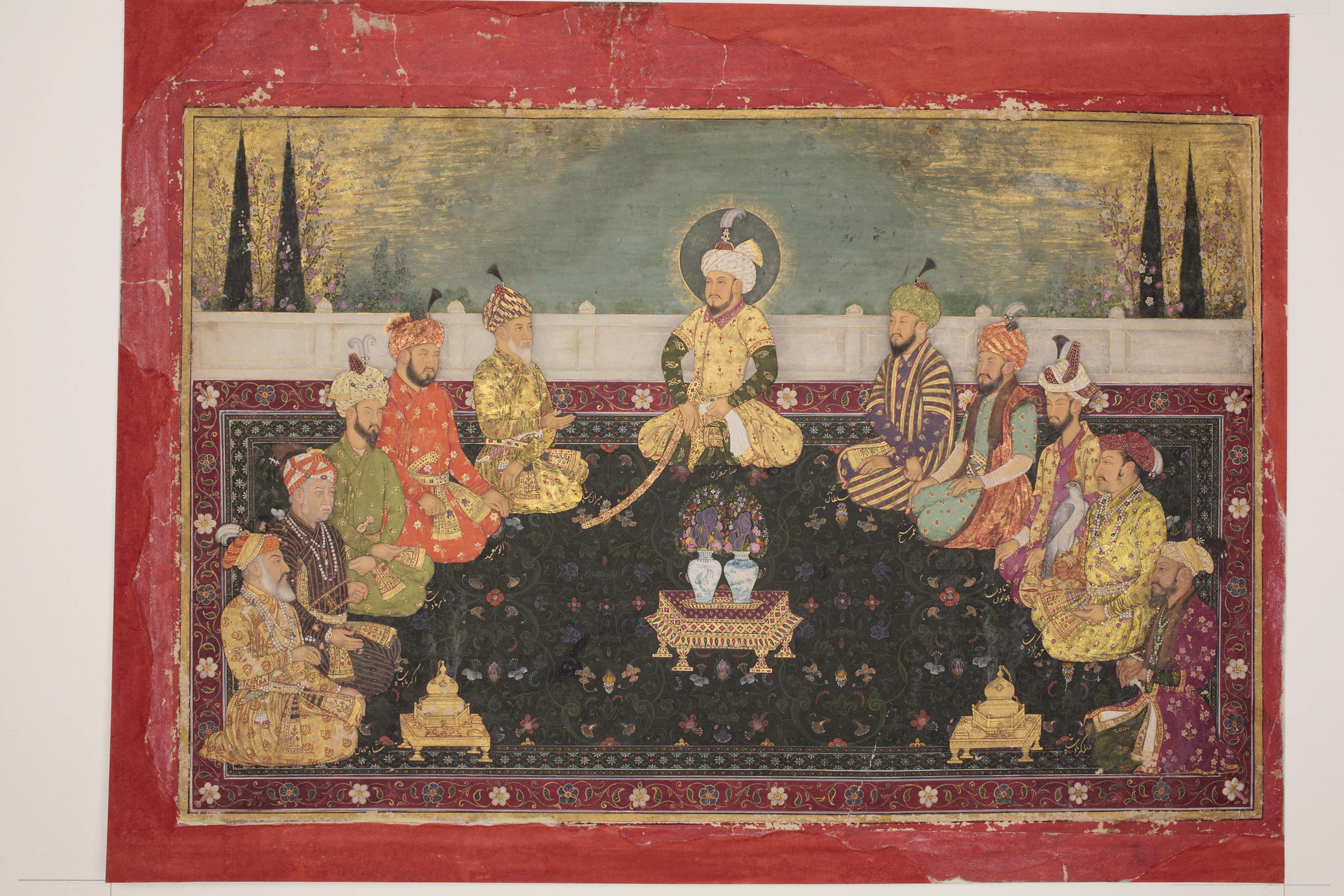
Group portrait of Mughal rulers, from Babur to Aurangzeb, with the Mughal ancestor Timur seated in the middle. On the left: Shah Jahan, Akbar and Babur, with Abu Sa'id of Samarkand and Timur's son, Miran Shah. On the right: Aurangzeb, Jahangir and Humayun, and two of Timur's other offspring Umar Shaykh and Muhammad Sultan. Created c. 1707–12.

Shah Jahan (reigned 1628–1658) was born to Jahangir and his wife Jagat Gosain. His reign ushered in the golden age of Mughal architecture. During the reign of Shah Jahan, the splendour of the Mughal court reached its peak, as exemplified by the Taj Mahal. The cost of maintaining the court, however, began to exceed the revenue coming in. Shah Jahan extended the Mughal Empire to the Deccan by ending the Ahmadnagar Sultanate and forcing the Adil Shahis and Qutb Shahis to pay tribute.

Shah Jahan's eldest son, the liberal Dara Shikoh, became regent in 1658, as a result of his father's illness. Dara championed a syncretistic Hindu-Muslim culture, emulating his great-grandfather Akbar. With the support of the Islamic orthodoxy, however, a younger son of Shah Jahan, Aurangzeb (r. 1658–1707), seized the throne. Aurangzeb defeated Dara in 1659 and had him executed. Although Shah Jahan fully recovered from his illness, Aurangzeb kept Shah Jahan imprisoned until he died in 1666. Aurangzeb brought the empire to its greatest territorial extent, and oversaw an increase in the Islamicisation of the Mughal state. He encouraged conversion to Islam, reinstated the jizya on non-Muslims, and compiled the Fatawa 'Alamgiri, a collection of Islamic law. Aurangzeb also ordered the execution of the Sikh guru Tegh Bahadur, leading to the militarisation of the Sikh community. From the imperial perspective, conversion to Islam integrated local elites into the king's vision of a network of shared identity that would join disparate groups throughout the empire in obedience to the Mughal emperor. He led campaigns from 1682 in the Deccan, annexing its remaining Muslim powers of Bijapur and Golconda, though engaged in a prolonged conflict in the region which had a ruinous effect on the empire. The campaigns took a toll on the Mughal treasury, and Aurangzeb's absence led to a severe decline in governance, while stability and economic output in the Mughal Deccan plummeted.

Aurangzeb is considered the most controversial Mughal emperor, with some historians arguing his religious conservatism and intolerance undermined the stability of Mughal society, while other historians question this, noting that he financed or patronised the building of non-Muslim institutions, employed significantly more Hindus in his imperial bureaucracy than his predecessors did, and opposed bigotry against Hindus and Shi'a Muslims.

=== Decline (1707–1857) ===
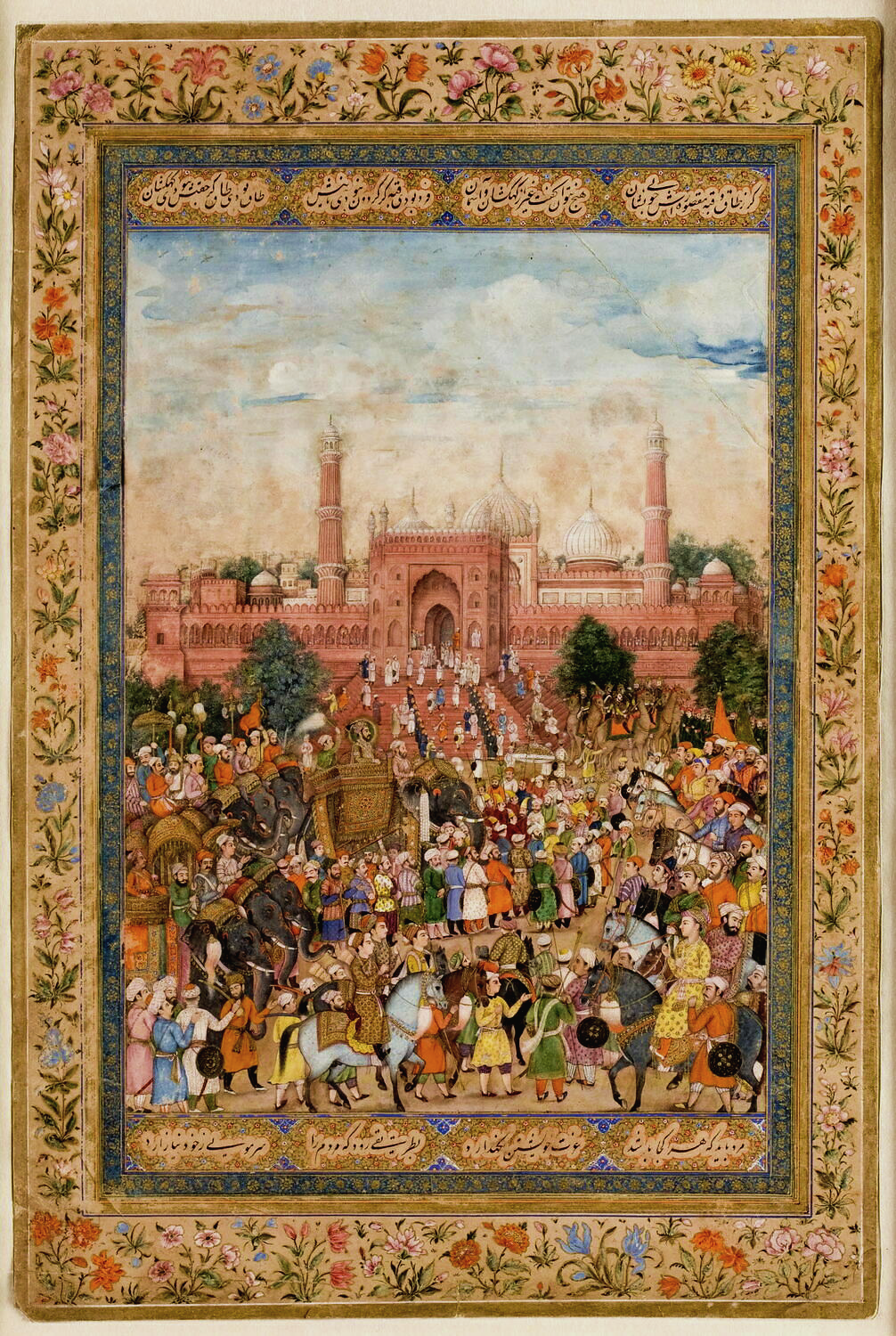
Delhi under the puppet-emperor Farrukhsiyar. Effective power was held by the Sayyid Brothers.

Aurangzeb's son, Bahadur Shah I, repealed the religious policies of his father and attempted to reform the administration. "However, after he died in 1712, the Mughal dynasty began to sink into chaos and violent feuds. In 1719 alone, four emperors successively ascended the throne" as figureheads under the Indian Muslim clan known as the Barha family, whose leaders, the Sayyid brothers, became the de facto sovereigns in the empire.

During the reign of Muhammad Shah (reigned 1719–1748), the empire began to break up, and vast tracts of central India passed from Mughal to Maratha hands. As the Mughals tried to suppress the independence of Asaf Jah I in the Deccan, he encouraged the Marathas to invade central and northern India. The Indian campaign of Nader Shah culminated with the sack of Delhi in 1739, shattering the remnants of Mughal power and prestige, and taking off all the accumulated Mughal treasury. The Mughals could no longer finance the huge armies with which they had formerly enforced their rule. Many of the empire's elites now sought to control their affairs and broke away to form independent kingdoms. But lip service continued to be paid to the Mughal Emperor as the highest manifestation of sovereignty. Not only the Muslim gentry, but the Maratha, Rajput, and Sikh leaders took part in ceremonial acknowledgements of the emperor as the sovereign of India.

Meanwhile, some regional polities within the increasingly fragmented Mughal Empire involved themselves and the state in global conflicts, leading only to defeat and loss of territory during conflicts such as the Carnatic wars and Bengal War.

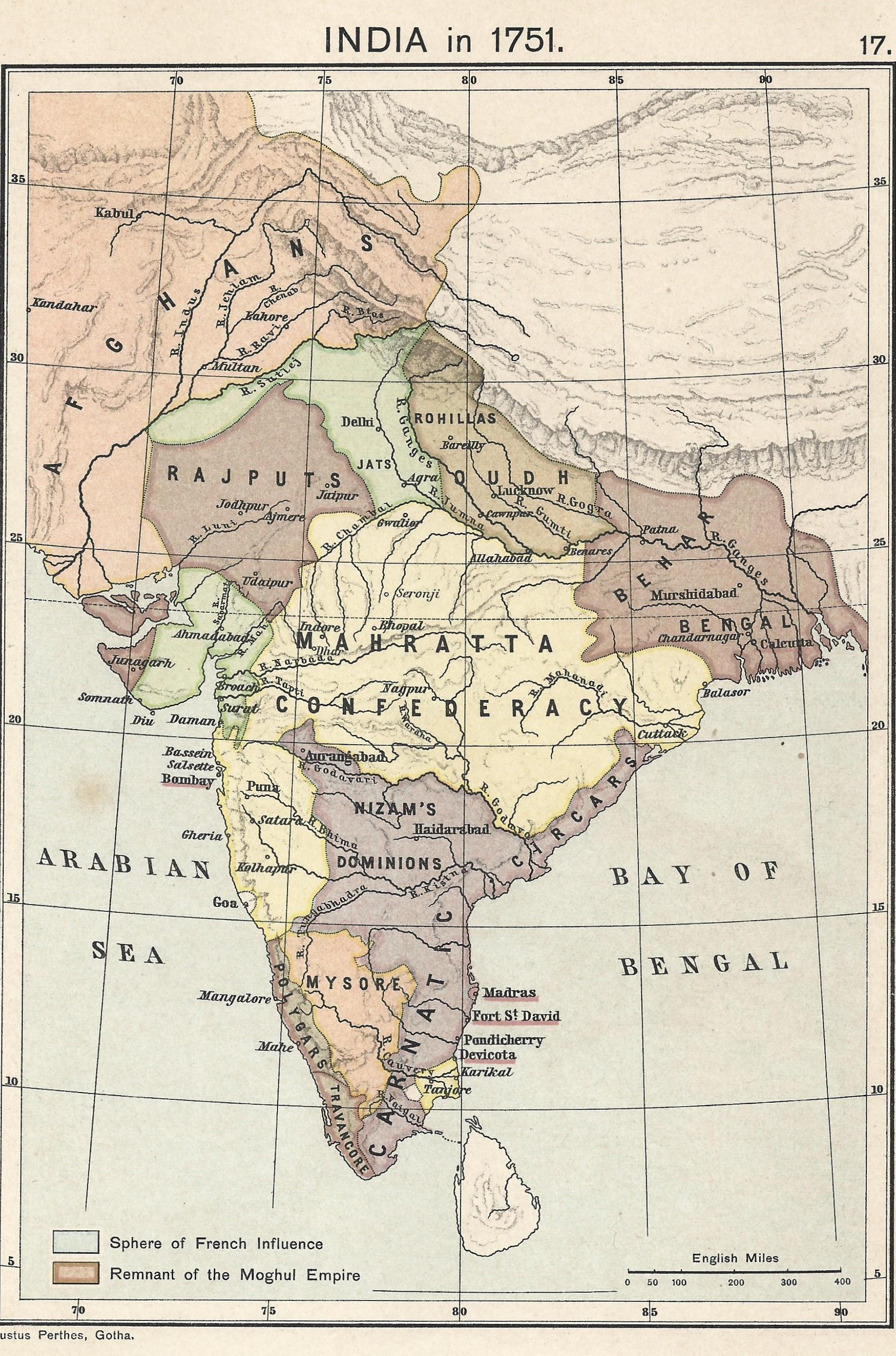
The remnants of the empire in 1751

The Mughal Emperor Shah Alam II (1759–1806) made futile attempts to reverse the Mughal decline. Delhi was sacked by the Afghans, and when the Third Battle of Panipat was fought between the Maratha Empire and the Afghans led by Ahmad Shah Durrani in 1761, in which the Afghans were victorious, the emperor had ignominiously taken temporary refuge with the British to the east. In 1771, the Marathas recaptured Delhi from the Rohillas, and in 1784 the Marathas officially became the protectors of the emperor in Delhi, a state of affairs that continued until the Second Anglo-Maratha War. Thereafter, the British East India Company became the protectors of the Mughal dynasty in Delhi. The British East India Company took control of the former Mughal province of Bengal-Bihar in 1793 after it abolished local rule (Nizamat) that lasted until 1858, marking the beginning of the British colonial era over the Indian subcontinent. By 1857 a considerable part of former Mughal India was under the East India Company's control. After a crushing defeat in the Indian Rebellion of 1857 which he nominally led, the last Mughal emperor, Bahadur Shah Zafar, was deposed on 21 September 1857 after Delhi came under siege by the British East India Company and exiled in 1858 to Rangoon, Burma.

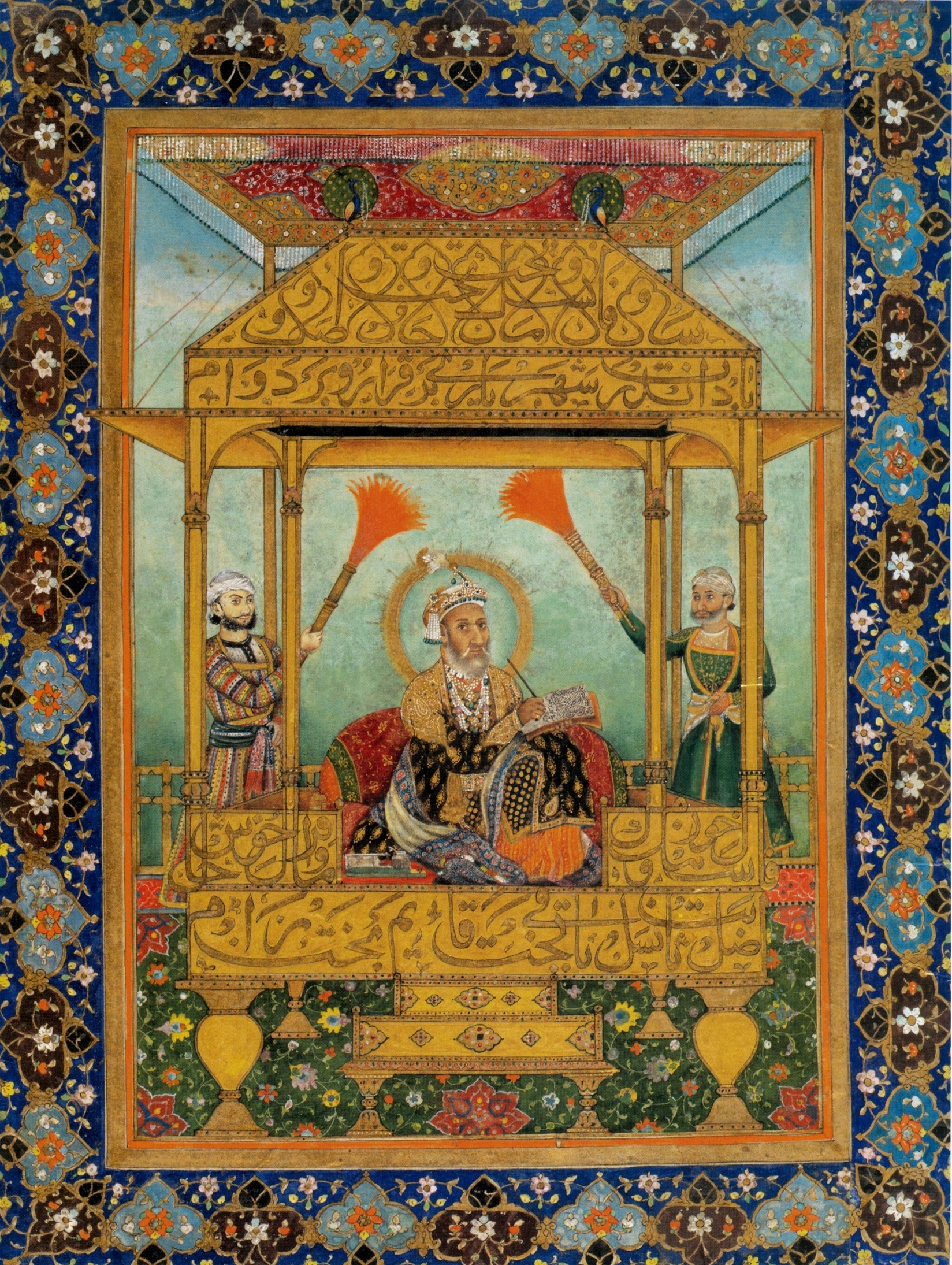
Portrait of Bahadur Shah Zafar

=== Causes of decline ===
Historians have offered numerous accounts of the several factors involved in the rapid collapse of the Mughal Empire between 1707 and 1720, after a century of growth and prosperity. A succession of short-lived incompetent and weak rulers, and civil wars over the succession, created political instability at the centre. The Mughals appeared virtually unassailable during the 17th century, but, once gone, their imperial overstretch became clear, and the situation could not be recovered. The seemingly innocuous European trading companies, such as the British East India Company, played no real part in the initial decline; they were still racing to get permission from the Mughal rulers to establish trades and factories in India.

In fiscal terms, the throne lost the revenues needed to pay its chief officers, the emirs (nobles) and their entourages. The emperor lost authority as the widely scattered imperial officers lost confidence in the central authorities and made their deals with local men of influence. The imperial army bogged down in long, futile wars against the more aggressive Marathas, and lost its fighting spirit. Finally came a series of violent political feuds over control of the throne. After the execution of Emperor Farrukhsiyar in 1719, local Mughal successor states took power in region after region.

Titular emperors

Over the course of the empire, there were several claimants to the Mughal throne who ascended the throne or claimed to do so but were actually never recognized.

Here are the claimants to the Mughal throne historians recognise as titular Mughal emperors.

1. Shahryar Mirza (1627–1628)
2. Dawar Baksh (1627–1628)
3. Jahangir II (1719–1720)

== List of emperors ==
No.	Portrait	Name	Reign	Parents	Life details
1		Babur ظهیر الدین محمد بابر; Zahīr ud-Dīn Muḥammad Bābur	21 April 1526 – 26 December 1530 (4 years, 8 months and 5 days)	Umar Shaikh Mirza II; Qutlugh Nigar Khanum	14 February 1483 – 26 December 1530 (aged 47): Descendant of Tamerlane and Genghis Khan.; Ruler of Ferghana; pushed out into Kabul.; Defeated Lodis at Panipat (1526) and Rajputs at Khanwa (1527) to establish Mughal rule.; Died of illness.
2		Humayun نصیر الدین محمد همایوں; Nasīr ud-Dīn Muḥammad Humāyūn	26 December 1530 – 17 May 1540 (9 years, 4 months and 21 days)	Babur; Maham Begum	6 March 1508 – 27 January 1556 (aged 47): Son and heir of Babur; conflicted with his brothers over the empire.; Defeated and overthrown by Sher Shah Suri; fled to Kabul and then Persia.
Suri Interregnum (1540–1555)
(2)		Humayun نصیر الدین محمد همایوں; Nasīr ud-Dīn Muḥammad Humāyūn	22 February 1555 – 27 January 1556 (11 months and 5 days)	Babur; Maham Begum	6 March 1508 – 27 January 1556 (aged 47): Returned and recovered the throne with Safavid assistance.; Died after falling down the stairs of his library.
3		Akbar جلال الدین محمد اکبر; Jalāl ud-Dīn Muḥammad Akbar	11 February 1556 – 27 October 1605 (49 years, 8 months and 16 days)	Humayun; Hamida Banu Begum	15 October 1542 – 27 October 1605 (aged 63): Son and heir of Humayun; ascended as a child under regent Bairam Khan after victory in the Second Battle of Panipat.; Built mansabdari system; promoted syncretic Din-i-ilahi; expanded Mughal territory.; Died of illness (likely dysentery).
4		Jahangir نور الدین محمد جهانگیر; Nūr ud-Dīn Muḥammad Jahāngīr	3 November 1605 – 28 October 1627 (21 years, 11 months and 25 days)	Akbar; Mariam uz-Zamani	31 August 1569 – 28 October 1627 (aged 58): Son and heir of Akbar I; effective rule by his empress Nur Jahan.; Died of natural causes.
5		Shah Jahan شهاب الدین محمد شاه جهان; Shihāb ud-Dīn Muḥammad Shāh Jahān	19 January 1628 – 31 July 1658 (30 years, 6 months and 12 days)	Jahangir; Jagat Gosain	5 January 1592 – 22 January 1666 (aged 74): Son of Jahangir; defeated his brothers in a war of succession.; Commissioned the Taj Mahal, the Red Fort, and the Peacock Throne.; Deposed and imprisoned by his son Aurangzeb; died in prison.
6		Aurangzeb Alamgir محی الدین محمد اورنگزیب عالمگیر; Muḥī ud-Dīn Muḥammad Aurangzeb ʿĀlamgīr	31 July 1658 – 3 March 1707 (48 years, 7 months and 3 days)	Shah Jahan; Mumtaz Mahal	3 November 1618 – 3 March 1707 (aged 88): Son of Shah Jahan I; defeated his brothers in a war of succession and deposed his father.; Imposed orthodox religious policies.; Inconclusive Mughal-Marathas wars; empire reaches its maximum extent.; Died of natural causes while on campaign.
7		Azam Shah قطب الدين محمد اعظم شاہ; Qutb ud-Dīn Muḥammad Aʿẓam Shāh	14 March – 20 June 1707 (3 months and 6 days)	Aurangzeb; Dilras Banu Begum	28 June 1653 – 20 June 1707 (aged 53): Son and heir apparent of Aurangzeb.; Defeated and killed by his brother.
8		Bahadur Shah مرزا محمد معظم بهادر شاہ شاه عالم; Mīrzā Muḥammad Muʿaẓẓam Bahādur Shāh Shāh ʿĀlam	19 June 1707 – 27 February 1712 (4 years, 8 months and 8 days)	Aurangzeb; Nawab Bai	14 October 1643 – 27 February 1712 (aged 68): Son of Aurangzeb; overthrew his brother.; Died of natural causes.
9		Jahandar Shah معز الدین محمد جهاندار شاہ; Muʿizz ud-Dīn Muḥammad Jahāndār Shāh	27 February 1712 – 11 February 1713 (11 months and 15 days)	Bahadur Shah; Nizam Bai	9 May 1661 – 12 February 1713 (aged 51): Son of Bahadur Shah I; won a war of succession with the help of Zulfiqar Khan, who became the de facto ruler.; Overthrown and executed by his nephew Farrukhsiyar.
10		Farrukhsiyar معین الدین محمد فرخ سیر; Muʿīn ud-Dīn Muḥammad Farrukhsiyar	11 February 1713 – 28 February 1719 (6 years and 17 days)	Azim-ush-Shan; Sahiba Niswan	20 August 1685 – 19 April 1719 (aged 33): Grandson of Bahadur Shah I; overthrew his uncle with backing from Sayyids of Barha.; Granted British East India company trading privileges in Bengal.; Clashed with Sayyid brothers, who eventually deposed, blinded and killed him.
11		Rafi ud-Darajat شمس الدین محمد رفیع الدرجات; Shams ud-Dīn Muḥammad Rafīʿ ud-Darajāt	28 February 1719 – 6 June 1719 (3 months and 9 days)	Rafi-ush-Shan; Nur un-Nissa Begum	1 December 1699 – 6 June 1719 (aged 19): Cousin of Farrukhsiyar; installed as a puppet by the Sayyid brothers.; A patient of tuberculosis; died soon after accession.
12		Shah Jahan II رفع الدين محمد شاہ جهان دوم; Rafīʿ ud-Dīn Muḥammad Shāh Jahān Duwum	6 June 1719 – 17 September 1719 (3 months and 11 days)	Rafi-ush-Shan; Nur un-Nissa Begum	5 January 1696 – 18 September 1719 (aged 23): Brother of Rafi ud-Darajat; installed as a puppet by the Sayyid brothers.; Died of an illness.
13		Muhammad Shah نصیر الدین محمد شاه; Nasīr ud-Dīn Muḥammad Shāh	27 September 1719 – 26 April 1748 (28 years, 6 months and 30 days)	Bahadur Shah I; Fakhr un-Nissa Begum	7 August 1702 – 26 April 1748 (aged 45): Cousin of Shah Jahan II; installed as a puppet by the Sayyid brothers, whom he had assassinated (1720).; Nader Shah's invasion of India; sack of Delhi (1739).; Died of natural causes.
14		Ahmad Shah Bahadur مجاهد الدین محمد احمد شاہ بهادر; Mujāhid ud-Dīn Muḥammad Aḥmad Shāh Bahādur	29 April 1748 – 2 June 1754 (6 years, 1 month and 4 days)	Muhammad Shah; Qudsia Begum	23 December 1725 – 1 January 1775 (aged 49): Son and heir of Muhammad Shah.; Durrani invasions of India (1748).; Rise of vizier Imad ul-Mulk, who deposed and blinded him.
15		Alamgir II عزیز اُلدین محمد عالمگیر دوم ʿAzīz ud-Dīn Muḥammad ʿĀlamgīr Duwum	3 June 1754 – 29 November 1759 (5 years, 5 months and 26 days)	Jahandar Shah; Anup Bai	6 June 1699 – 29 November 1759 (aged 60): Son of Jahandar Shah; installed by Imad ul-Mulk as a puppet.; Ahmad Shah Durrani's sack of Delhi (1757).; Assassinated on Imad ul-Mulk's orders.
16		Shah Jahan III محی الملت شاه جهان سوم; Muḥī al-Millat Shāh Jahān Sivum	10 December 1759 – 10 October 1760 (10 months)	Muhi us-Sunnat	1711 – 1772 (aged 61): Great-grandson of Aurangzeb; installed by Imad ul-Mulk as a puppet.; Deposed soon after.
17		Shah Alam II جلال الدین علی گوهر شاه عالم دوم; Jalāl ud-Dīn Muḥammad ʿAlī Gauhar Shāh ʿĀlam Duwum	10 October 1760 – 31 July 1788 (27 years, 9 months and 21 days)	Alamgir II; Zinat Mahal	25 June 1728 – 19 November 1806 (aged 78): Son of Alamgir II; proclaimed emperor in exile, did not actually enter Delhi till 1772.; Mughal defeat at the Battle of Buxar (1764).; Deposed and blinded by the Rohilla chieftan, Ghulam Qadir.
18		Jahan Shah بیدار بخت محمود شاه بهادر جهان شاه; Bīdār Bakht Maḥmūd Shāh Bahādur Jahān Shāh	31 July 1788 – 11 October 1788 (2 months and 11 days)	Ahmad Shah Bahadur	1749 – 1790 (aged 41): Son of Ahmad Shah Bahadur; installed by Ghulam Qadir.; Deposed by Mahadji Shinde after his defeat of Ghulam Qadir; killed by Shah Alam II.
(17)		Shah Alam II جلال الدین محمد علی گوهر شاه عالم دوم; Jalāl ud-Dīn Muḥammad ʿAlī Gauhar Shāh ʿĀlam Duwum	16 October 1788 – 19 November 1806 (18 years, 1 month and 3 days)	Alamgir II; Zinat Mahal	25 June 1728 – 19 November 1806 (aged 78): Restored by Mahadji Shinde; figurehead under Marathas.; Battle of Delhi (1803); end of Maratha rule over Mughals; became figurehead under British East India Company.; Died of natural causes.
19		Akbar Shah II معین الدین محمد اکبر شاه دوم; Muʿīn ud-Dīn Muḥammad Akbar Shāh Duwum	19 November 1806 – 28 September 1837 (30 years, 10 months and 9 days)	Shah Alam II; Qudsia Begum	22 April 1760 – 28 September 1837 (aged 77): Son and heir of Shah Alam II; figurehead under British.; Died of natural causes.
20		Bahadur Shah II سراج اُلدین محمد بهادر شاه ظفر; Sirāj ud-Dīn Muḥammad Bahādur Shāh Ẓafar	28 September 1837 – 21 September 1857 (19 years, 11 months and 24 days)	Akbar Shah II; Lal Bai	24 October 1775 – 7 November 1862 (aged 87): Son and heir of Akbar Shah II; figurehead under British.; Became reluctant figurehead leader of the failed Indian rebellion (1857).; Tried and exiled to Burma by the British; died in exile.

== Genealogy ==
Mughal family tree

Babur r. 1526–1530
Humayun r. 1530–1540, 1555–1556	Masuma Begum	Kamran d. 1557	Gulchehra Begum d. 1557	Askari d. 1557	Hindal d. 1551	Gulbadan Begum	Gulrukh Begum
Akbar r. 1556–1605	Muhammad Hakim d. 1585
Jahangir r. 1605–1627	Shahzada Khanam	Murad d. 1599	Daniyal d. 1604	Shakr-un-Nissa Begum d. 1653	Aram Banu Begum d. 1624
Sultan un-Nissa Begum d. 1646	Khusrau d. 1622	Parviz d. 1626	Bahar Banu Begum d. 1653	Shah Jahan r. 1628–1658, d. 1666	Lizzat-un-nisa Begum d. 1603	Jahandar	Shahrayar d. 1628
Jahanara Begum d. 1681	Dara Shikoh d. 1659	Shah Shuja d. 1661	Roshanara Begum d. 1671	Aurangzeb r. 1658–1707	Murad Baksh d. 1661
Bahadur Shah I r. 1707–1712	Azam Shah r. 1707	Muhammad Akbar d. 1706	Kam Bakhsh d. 1709
Azim-ush-Shan d. 1712	Rafi-ush-Shan d. 1712	Jahandar Shah r. 1712–1713	Khujista Akhtar d. 1712	Nekusiyar d. 1723	Muhi us-Sunnat d. 1747
Farrukhsiyar r. 1713–1719	Shah Jahan II r. 1719	Rafi ud-Darjat r. 1719	Jahangir II d. 1746	Alamgir II r. 1754–1759	Muhammad Shah r. 1719–1748	Shah Jahan III r. 1759–1760, d. 1772
Shah Alam II r. 1760–1788, 1788–1806	Ahmad Shah r. 1748–1754, d. 1775
Akbar Shah II r. 1806–1837	Jahan Shah r. 1788, d. 1790
Bahadur Shah II r. 1837–1857, d. 1862

== See also ==
- Timurid family tree
- Mughal-Mongol genealogy
- List of Mughal empresses
