= Uways Khan Mirza =

Sultan Uways Khan Mirza
- Mirza; Monarch; Padshah

Sultan of Badakhshan
- Reign: 1508–1521
- Predecessor: Sultan Mahmud Mirza
- Successor: Humayun (on behalf of Babur)
- Died: 1521
- Issue: Mirza Sulayman
Names
- Sultan Uways Khan Mirza
- Dynasty: Timurid
- Father: Sultan Mahmud Mirza

Sultan Uways Khan Mirza, also Sultan Uvays Khan Mirza or simply Khan Mirza (died 1521) was Timurid ruler of Badakhshan from 1508 to 1521. A son of Sultan Mahmud Mirza from his wife Sultan Nigar Khanum and grandson of the last Timurid emperor Abu Sa'id Mirza, he was therefore a cousin of the founder of the Mughal Empire Babur. After his death Badakhshan was annexed by Babur with Humayun being appointed in his place, but his son Mīrzā Sulaimān (1514–1589) was restored in 1528.

As a Miranshahi Timurid (i.e. a Timurid descending from Miran Shah), he was quite close to his cousin and participated in various campaigns with him, as in the campaign of Qunduz in 1511, where Timur was rejoined by Uways with 20,000 Mongol troops, against the Uzbeks. After the Battle of Ab Darrah Pass, together they took Samarkand from the Uzbeks in October 1511, with an army claimed to be 60,000 strong.

After the death of Khān Mīzā in 1521, Bābur took direct control of his dominion of Badakhshan, later entrusting it to his son Humayun. However, when Humayun left his post without permission in June 1529, Bābur placed in his position the young Mīrzā Sulaimān, who was now fifteen years old. Mīrzā Sulaimān (1514–1589) later fought against the Mughals in Afghanistan and India.
