= Sultan Masud Mirza bin Mahmud Mirza =

Sultan Masud Mirza
- Sultan of Hissar
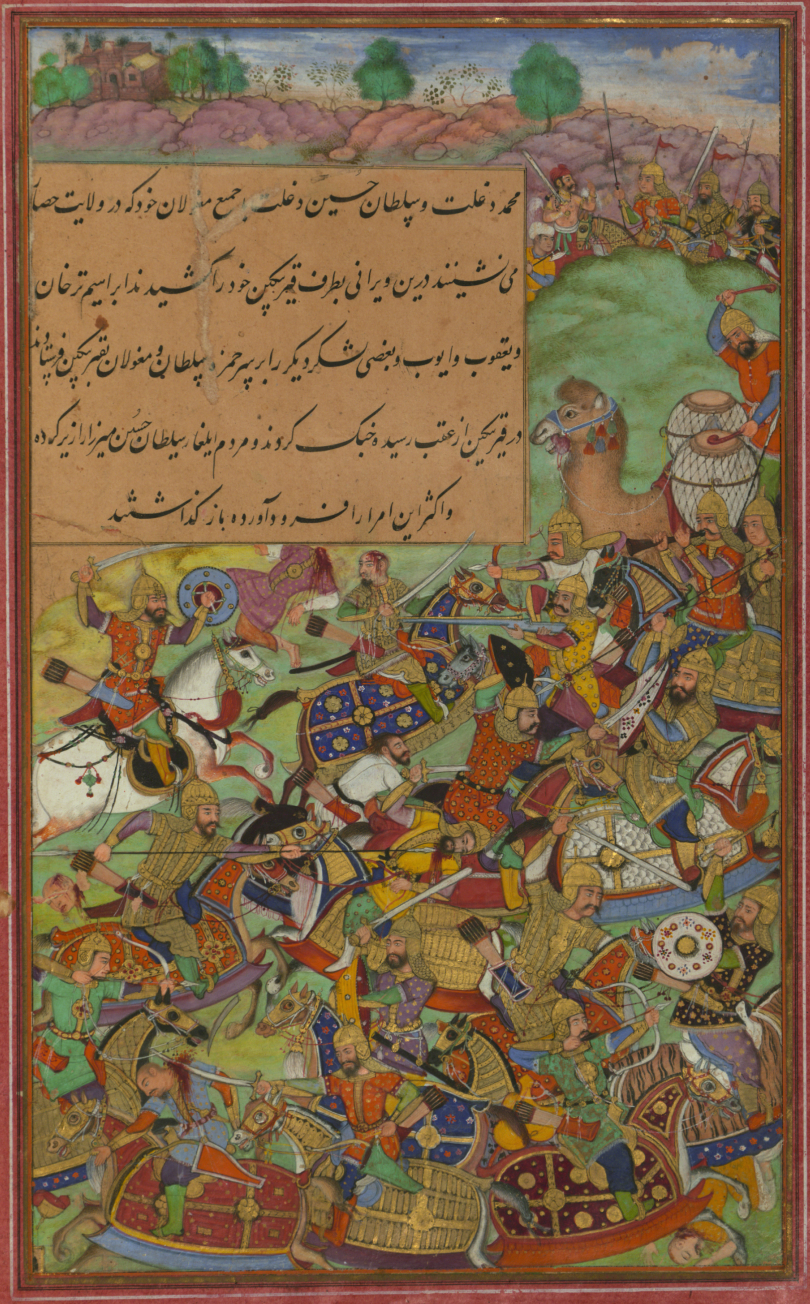
- The battle of Sultan Ḥusayn Mīrzā against Sultan Masʿūd Mīrzā at Hiṣṣār, Baburnama, late 16th century

Timurid Ruler of Hissar
- Reign: 1495-1497
- Predecessor: Sultan Mahmud Mirza
- Successor: Sultan Baysonqor
- Died: after 1501
- Father: Sultan Mahmud Mirza

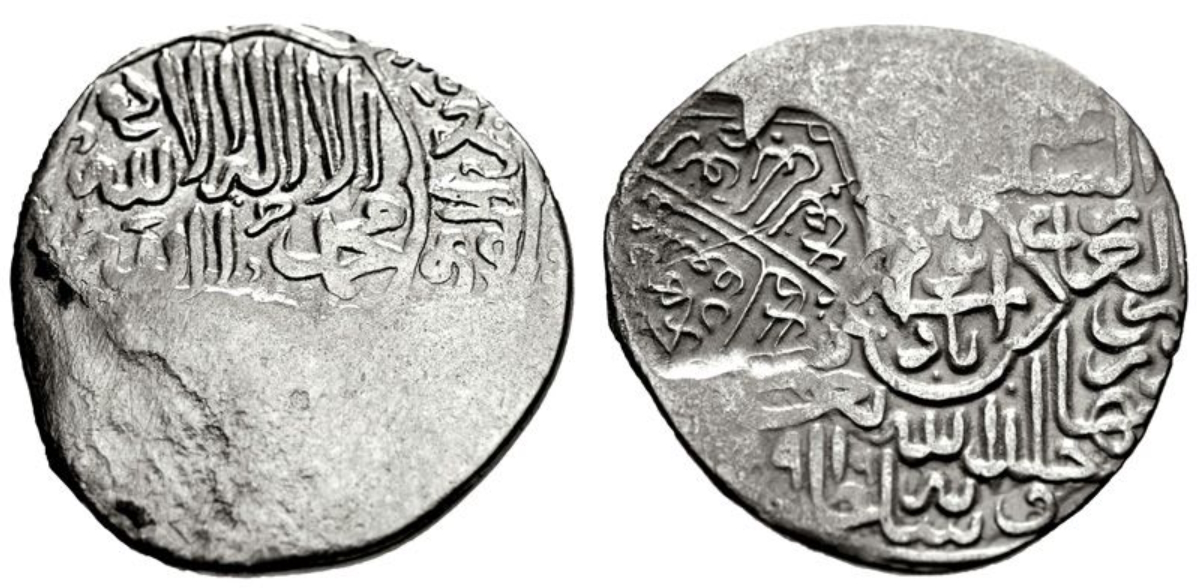
Coinage of Sultan Mas'ud

Sultan Masud Mirza (Note: Chagatai and Persian: سلطان مسعود میرزا) (? - after 1501) was a Prince from the Timurid dynasty and a grandson of Abu Sa'id Mirza.

== Biography ==
He was the eldest son of Sultan Mahmud Mirza and his wife Khanzade Begum, daughter of Mir Buzurg, ruler of Termez.

When his father died in January 1495, he had divided Transoxiana amongst his 3 sons. Sultan Masud received Hissar as his possession from his father. In the winter of 1495, Sultan Husayn Bayqara of Herat gathered an army and marched to Termez. Sultan Masud marched against him, but didn't risk to cross the Amu Darya and finally retreated to Hissar. Having learned about the approach of Bayqara's troops, he fled to Samarkand to his younger brother Baysunkar Mirza.

In June 1496, he besieged Samarkand in alliance with his brother Sultan Ali Mirza and his cousin Babur, but three months later he retreated for Hissar, taking as his wife the daughter of one of the sheikhs. Some emirs distanced themselves from him, and in 1497, Hissar was captured by his former supporter Khusroe Shah and his brother Baysunkar Mirza. He fled from there with his father-in-law, and later he went to his former enemy Bayqara, with whom he made peace. Leaving Bayqara's court after some time, he returned to Hissar.

In 1498, his former “faithful emirs” formed a conspiracy, he was captured and blinded by Khusroe Shah. They were going to send him to Sultan Ali Mirza, whose people were supposed to kill him, but he was taken out of Hissar by loyal supporters and returned to Herat and Sultan Bayqara. Nothing more is known about him after this.

== Sources ==
- Memoirs of Babur Volume 1 (Baburnama in English)

Sultan Masud Mirza bin Mahmud Mirza Timurid dynasty
Preceded by Sultan Mahmud Mirza	Timurid Empire (in Hissar); 1495-1497	Succeeded by Baysunkar Mirza (Nominal)
