= Siege of Samarkand (1497) =

Part of Timurid Civil Wars

- Part of Timurid–Uzbek wars Timurid civil wars
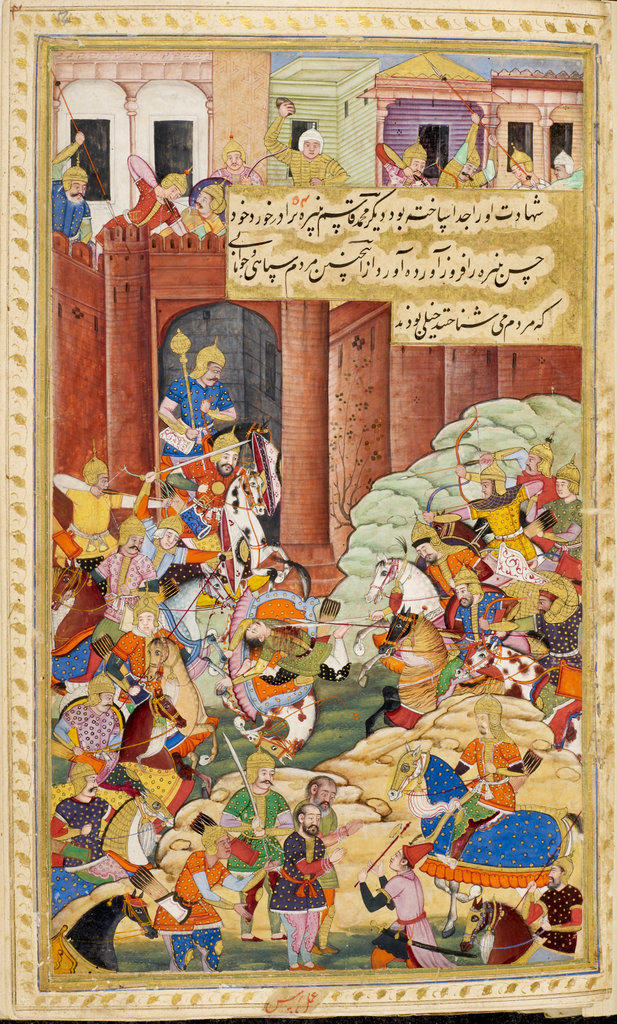
- Babur’s army storming Samarkand (1497)
Date	May - November 1497
Location	Samarkand, Uzbekistan
Result	Victory of Babur

Belligerents
Timurids of Ferghana; Timurids of Bukhara	Khanate of Bukhara; Timurids of Samarkand

Commanders and leaders
Zahir-ud-din Babur; Sultan Ali Mirza	Muhammad Shaybani; Sultan Baysonqor Mirza

The siege of Samarkand (1497) was a successful siege by the two armies of Emir Babur of Fergana and Sultan Ali of Bukhara of the city of Samarkand. In May 1497, the city was captured after seven months of siege.

== Siege ==
=== Prelude ===
In 1497, Babur and his cousin Sultan Ali Mirza agreed to jointly attack Samarkand, which was ruled by Ali's brother Sultan Baysonqor Mirza.

In May 1497, Babur led his army from Andijan into the territory of Sultan Baysonqor Mirza and after various successes encamped at Yam, a village not far from Samarkand. Some skirmishes followed. From Yam, Babur moved his camp to Yurat Khan (or Khan Yirti), a place four or five miles from the city where he remained forty or fifty days. Many skirmishes took place with considerable losses on both sides. On one of these occasions a party that Babur had sent to the Lovers Cave to surprise the city by night, on the treacherous invitation of some of the townspeople, fell into an ambush by which some of his bravest soldiers were slain and others taken prisoner and afterwards put to death.

However, while Babur camped there, the inhabitants of all the neighboring countryside submitted and surrendered their strongholds to him. From the station of Yurat Khan, Babur moved first to the meadow of Kulbeh and next to the hill of Kohik on a different side of the town. When the people of Samarkand saw the enemy army on the march from one position to the other, thinking that it was on its retreat and elated with their supposed success, they sallied out both soldiers and citizens in great numbers towards two bridges crossing the River Kohik (today known as Zarafshan River). Babur observing this movement waited for the favorable moment, when he ordered a charge of cavalry to be made upon them. It was completely successful. Large numbers of Samarkandians were cut down and many, both horse and foot, were taken prisoner. The higher officers and the soldiers were treated with the usual courtesy of the time. The same indulgence was not extended to the citizens.

This action enabled Babur's army to advance unopposed as far as to the moat around the city, and to carry off provisions from under the very walls. But the city itself was not captured and winter was approaching. Babur was nevertheless resolved not to leave the territory. He therefore decided to break up from his exposed positions before the city and to erect temporary huts for his troops in some neighboring forts by which means they could still keep Samarkand in a state of blockade. For this purpose, the fort of Khwaja Didar was chosen as his headquarters and the necessary constructions were begun in and around it without delay. When they were finished, the army moved into them. Some officers however went with their men to towns at a greater distance to secure better winter accommodation, which left the army rather scattered.

=== Uzbek relief attempt ===
At this critical moment, an Uzbek force arrived at Samarkand on the request of Baysonqor Mirza, under their leader Muhammad Shaybani, who would become Baburs' nemesis. Babur, though his forces were dispersed, resolved to show a bold countenance, put the troops that were with him in battle formation and marched out to face the enemy. Shaybani had hoped to take Babur by surprise, but finding him battle ready, chose not to risk a battle and withdrew towards Samarkand.

Baysonqor Mirza, who had expected a much more effectual relief from such a formidable reinforcement, was disappointed and vexed at the result and could not conceal his feelings. So he did not give Shaybani the favorable reception he had expected. The Uzbek ruler returned a few days after to Turkistan, but in the course of his short expedition, he had seen at once the richness of Samarkand and the weakness of its defenders. This is the first hostile appearance of that remarkable man, who afterwards exercised so powerful an influence on the fate of Babur and of Samarkand, which he would conquer in 1501.

=== Fall of the city ===
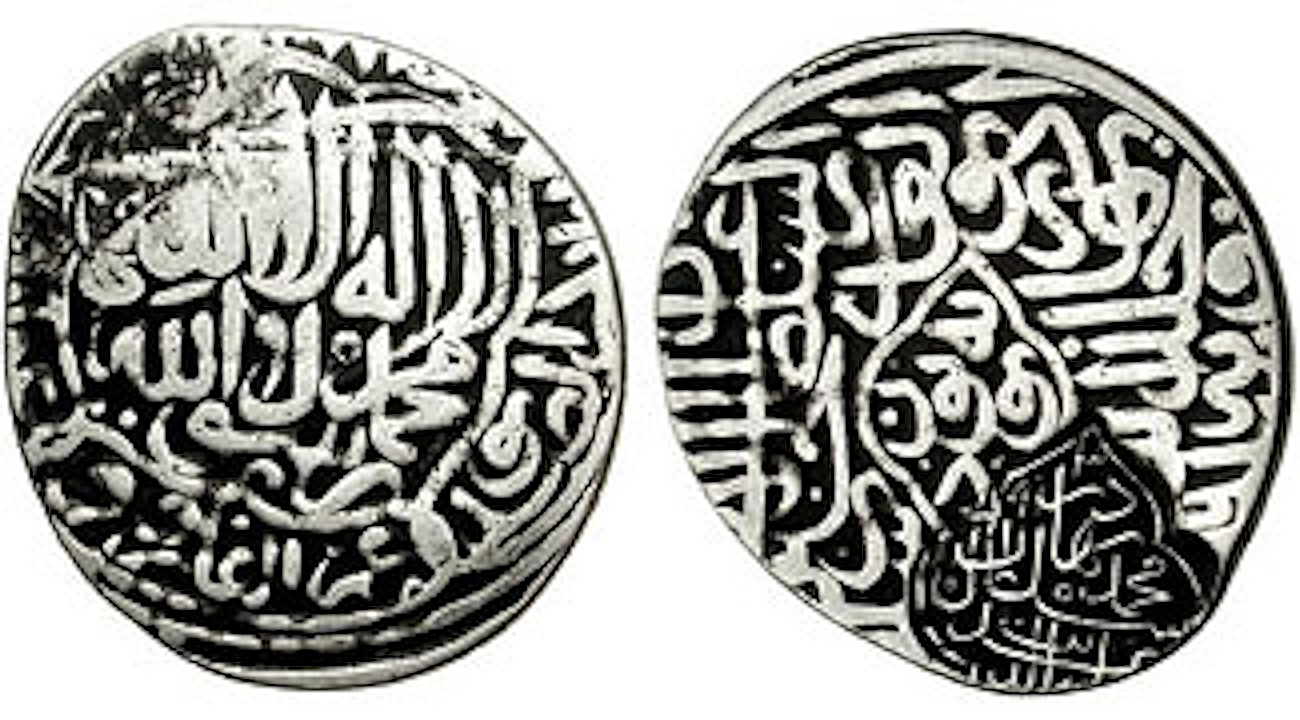
Coinage of Babur as Sultan of Ferghana, struck during his occupation of Samarkand in 1497-1498 (AH 903). It is a coin of the Timurid sultan Husayn Baiqara, countermarked with the Persian legend adl Sultan Zahir al-Din Muhammad Bahadur in a leaf shaped punch.

That city had now sustained a siege for seven months. Baysonqor Mirza had set his last hope of relief on the arrival of the Uzbek army. Seeing that action failed, he gave himself up to despair, abandoned the place and his kingdom, and, attended only by a few close followers, took the road to Kunduz, Afghanistan. That district, which lies beyond the Amu Darya between Balkh and Badakhshan, was then held by Khusroe Shah, who was nominally subject to Sultan Masud Mirza of Hissar, but with whom he had quarreled since that prince's retreat from Hissar, and of whom he was in reality independent.

Masud Mirza wanted to prevent that his brother and rival would be able to unite himself with a protector so formidable as Khusroe Shah, and made an attempt to seize him. Baysonqor Mirza, the fugitive prince passing through the territory of Hissar, escaped with difficulty, though with the loss of several of his followers who fell into Masud's hands. He finally, however, did succeed in reaching Kunduz where he was well received by Khusroe Shah, who had been the chief minister of his father but, at that time engrossed with his own schemes of power and conquest, regarded Baysonqor Mirza as a fit instrument for his soaring ambitions.

As soon as Babur heard of the flight of Baysonqor Mirza, he rallied his troops from their encampments towards Samarkand and took the city without opposition by the end of November 1497. What share his ally Sultan Ali Mirza had in this victory isn't clear, as no mention is being made of him during the siege. Babur, whether in consequence of special agreement or of his superior activity alone, entered the city. Sultan Ali had previously, however, overrun some of the dependent districts especially those in the neighborhood of Bukhara and continued to retain possession of them as well as of that city. The city of Samarkand, the possession of which thus rewarded the perseverance of the youthful Babur was one of the richest and most populous at that time in the world. It had been the capital of the great Timur and still maintained its preeminence in the countries he had conquered.

== Aftermath ==
Both Begs and soldiers who had looked forward to the rich plunder that it was to afford as the reward of the toils they had endured in a long siege, were extremely discontented when they discovered that the city was worn out from the long continuance of the blockade for which it was not originally prepared. The country laid waste by the movements of hostile armies for two successive summers and had been reduced to such a wretched condition that instead of any supplies being drawn from the fertile fields around, it was absolutely necessary for the government to furnish the inhabitants with seed corn to sow their grounds and with other supplies to enable them to subsist on till the ensuing harvest.

To levy contributions for his army from such a country was, as Babur himself remarked, quite impossible. His soldiers were consequently exposed to much distress and he possessed no adequate means of satisfying their wants. The men began to drop off and return home. The example set by the soldiers was soon followed even by their leaders. All his Mughal horse deserted, and in the end, Sultan Ahmed Tambol, a Mughal nobleman of the first rank in Andijan, forsook him like the rest and returned home.

Ahmed Tambol later rebelled and took over his Kingdom of Fergana, supporting Babur's brother Jahangir Mirza as the new king and joined by Uzun Hasan. The rebels lay siege to Andijan. As Babur was marching to recover his lost kingdom, his troops deserted him in Samarkand, leaving him with neither Samarkand nor Fergana. While he planned to retake Samarkand in 1500, he learnt that the Khan of the Uzbeks, Muhammad Shaybani, was also headed towards the city.

== See also ==
- Baburnama
