= Shah Jahan III =

Mughal emperor from 1759 to 1760

Shah Jahan III شاه جهان سوم
- Padishah; Al-Sultan Al-Azam; Mirza
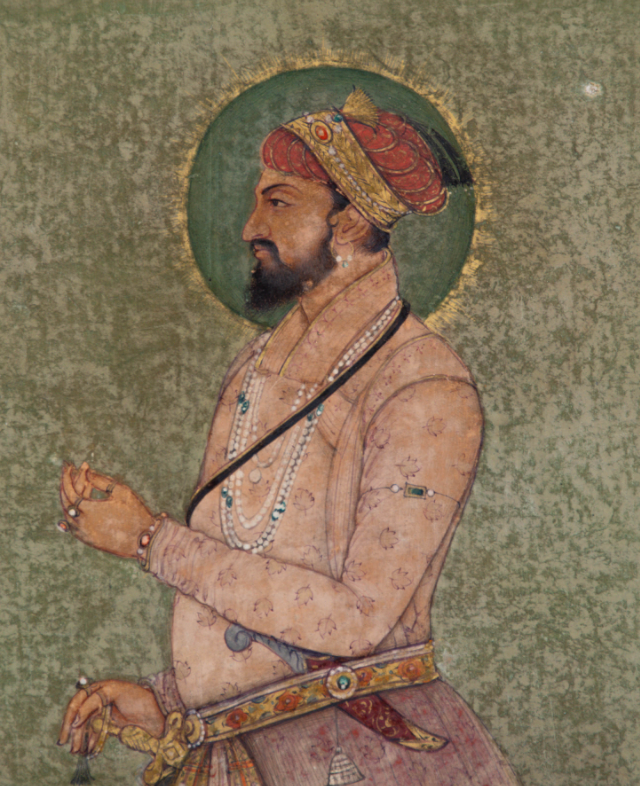
- Portrait of Muhi-ul-Millat before his deposition, c. 1759

16th Mughal Emperor
- Reign: 10 December 1759 – 10 October 1760
- Predecessor: Alamgir II
- Successor: Shah Alam II
- Vizier: Imad-ul-Mulk
- Born: Mirza Muhi-ul-Millat; 1711; Mughal Empire
- Died: 1772 (aged 60–61); Maratha Empire
- Issue: Mirza Sa'adat Bakht Bahadur; Mirza Ikram Bahadur
Names
- Mirza Muhi-ul-Millat Shah Jahan III
Era dates
- 18th century
Regnal name
- Shah Jahan III (Persian: شاه جهان سوم)
- House: Mughal dynasty
- Dynasty: Timurid dynasty
- Father: Muhi us-Sunnat
- Religion: Sunni Islam (Hanafi)

Shah Jahan III (Persian: شاه جهان سوم, Persian pronunciation: [ʃɒːh d͡ʒæ.hɒːn]; 1711–1772), also known as Mirza Muhi-ul-Millat (Persian: محی الملّت), was the sixteenth Mughal emperor, albeit briefly. He was the son of Muhi us-Sunnat, the eldest son of Muhammad Kam Bakhsh who was the youngest son of Aurangzeb. He was placed on the Mughal throne in December 1759 as a result of the intrigues in Delhi with the help of Imad-ul-Mulk. He was later deposed by Mughal ministers, acting in the name of the exiled Mughal Emperor Shah Alam II.

Preceded by Alamgir II	Mughal Emperor; 10 December 1759 – 10 October 1760	Succeeded by Shah Alam II
