= Muhi us-Sunnat =

Shahzada of the Mughal Empire (died 1747)

Muhi us-Sunnat محی السنت
- Shahzada of the Mughal Empire; Mirza
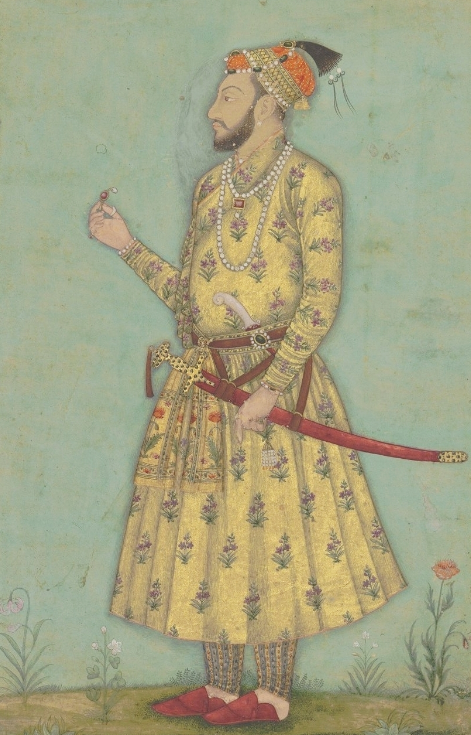
- Prince Muhi us-Sunnat wearing a yellow jama
- Born: India
- Died: 29 January 1747; Delhi, India
- Issue: Muhi ul-Millat
Names
- Muhammad Muhi us-Sunnat Mirza
- House: Mughal dynasty
- Dynasty: Timurid dynasty
- Father: Muhammad Kam Bakhsh
- Religion: Islam

Shahzada Muhammad Muhi us-Sunnat Mirza (Persian: شاهزاده محمد محی السنت میرزا) was the eldest surviving son of Mughal prince Muhammad Kam Bakhsh, himself the youngest son of emperor Aurangzeb.

He was imprisoned in the palace-prison of Salimgarh Fort after his father's defeat to his brother, emperor Bahadur Shah I, in the Mughal war of succession in 1709. He remained imprisoned until his death on 29 January 1747, during the reign of emperor Muhammad Shah.

His only son Prince Muhi ul-Millat was raised the throne in December 1759 as Shah Jahan III by the Grand Vizier Imad-ul-Mulk and the Marathas, but was deposed the following year after their defeat at the Battle of Panipat.
