= Sultan Ali bin Mahmud Mirza =

Last ruler of Timurid Samarkand from 1498 to 1500

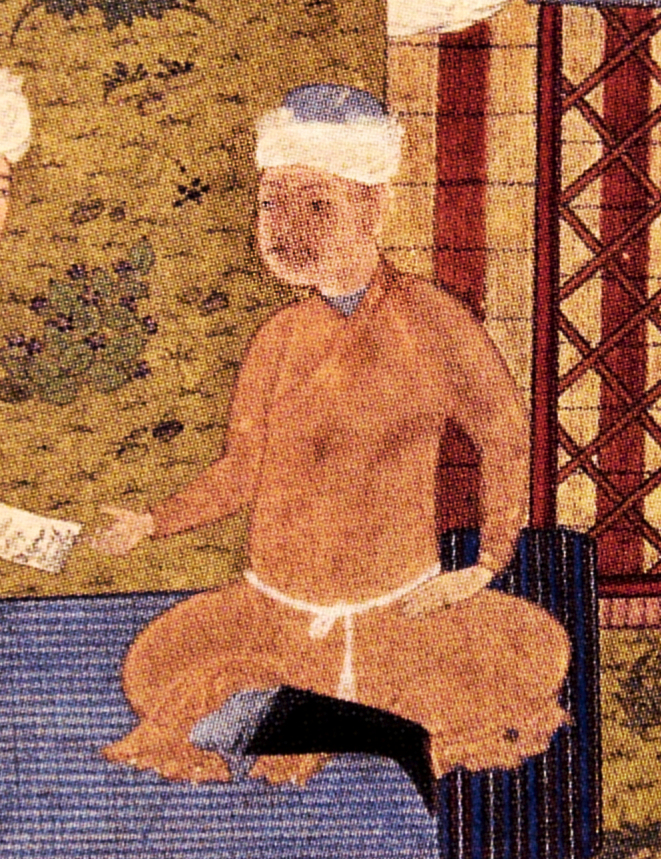
Likely contemporary portrait of Sultan Ali Mirza.

Sultan Ali Mirza (1479–1500) was the last ruler of the Timurid dynasty in Samarkand. He reigned between 1498 and 1500, when he was deposed and killed by Muhammad Shaybani, leader of the Uzbeks.

== Biography ==
He was the third son of Sultan Mahmud Mirza, himself the third son of the Timurid Emperor Abu Sa'id Mirza. His father ruled large parts of Transoxiana between 1494 and 1495. After his father's death, he received Bukhara as an inheritance.

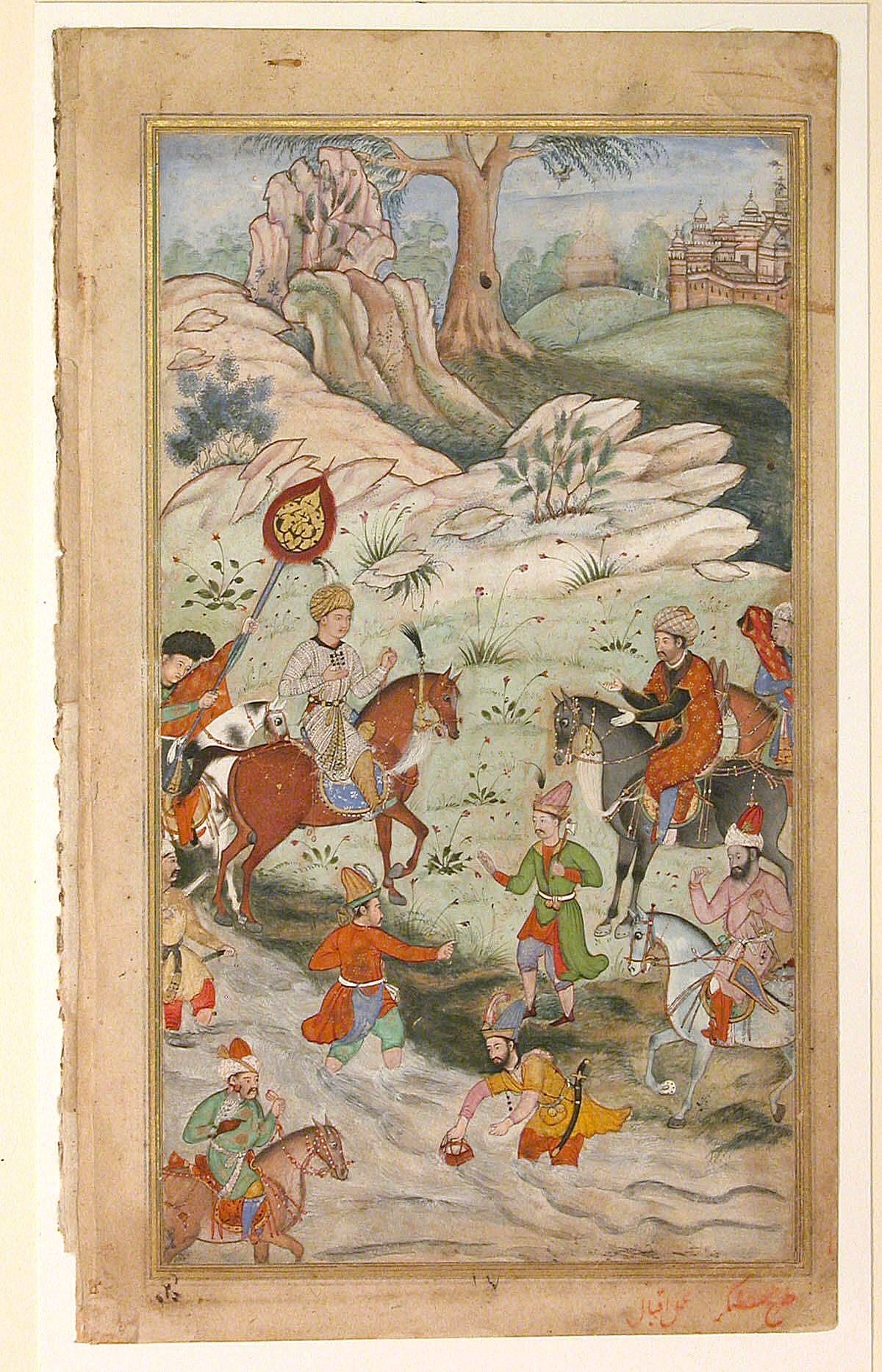
The meeting between Babur and Sultan Ali Mirza near Samarkand.

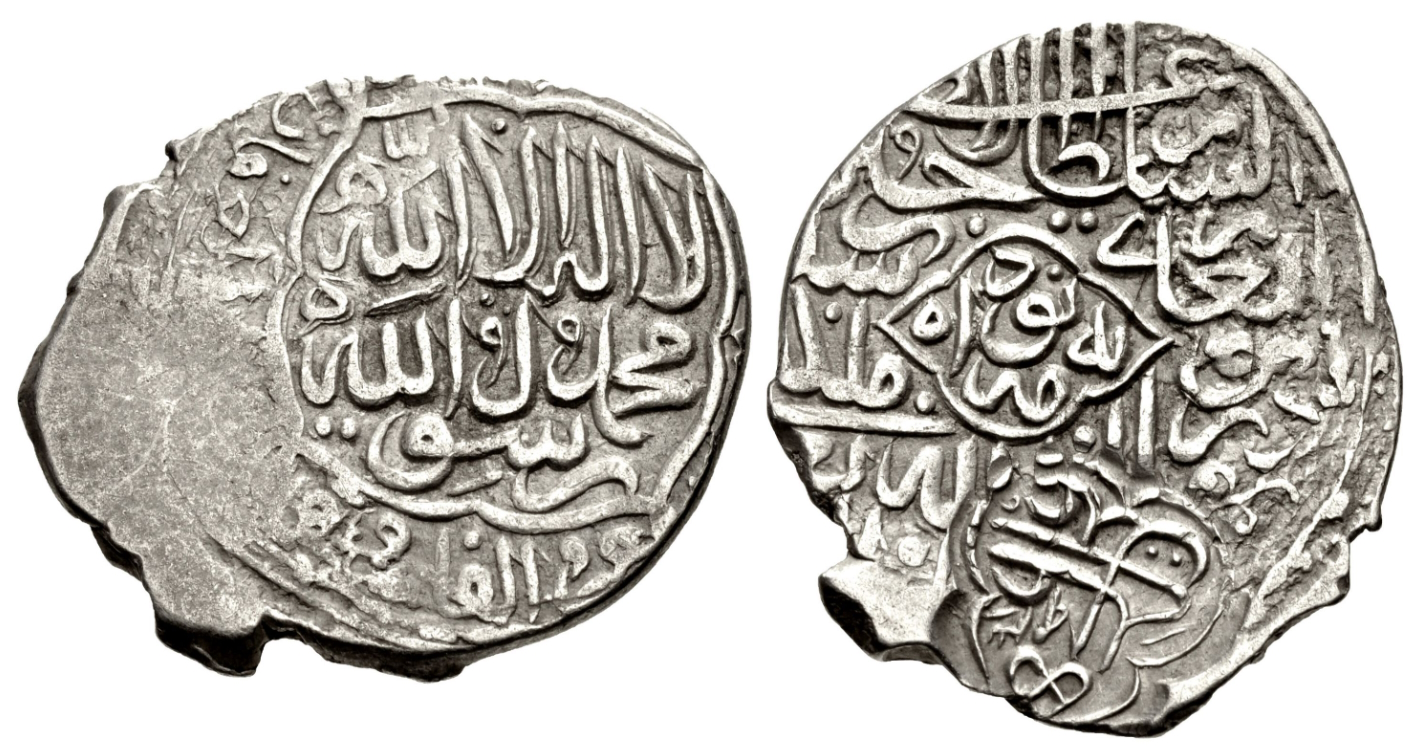
Coinage of Sultan 'Ali, dated AH 903 (AD 1497-8)

In 1496, a group of conspirators attempted to bring him to power in Samarkand. However, he reigned for only two days. His Timurid brother Baysunkar Mirza was placed in prison, from which he was soon able to escape. Gathering his supporters in the city, Baysunkar defeated the conspirators. Sultan Ali Mirza fled to Bukhara, where he was able to establish himself.

In 1497, together with his Timurid cousin Babur, he besieged Samarkand for seven months and conquered the city. When Babur was abandoned by his troops and returned to Andijan in 1498, Sultan Ali Mirza seized the Samarkand throne.

The reign of Sultan Ali Mirza was turbulent. Some of the nobility were dissatisfied with his policies and the economic chaos in the country. According to sources, a representative of the nobility, Muhammad Mazid Tarkhan, was the real master in Samarkand. He gave all important positions to his sons and followers and controlled the finances of the city.

In 1500, Samarkand capitulated to Muhammad Shaybani, Khan of the Uzbeks, and Sultan Ali Mirza was captured and executed.

== Source ==
- Memoirs of Babur Volume 1 (Baburnama in English)

Sultan Ali bin Mahmud Mirza Timurid dynasty
Preceded by Babur, Emir of Fergana	Timurid Empire (in Samarkand); 1498-1500	Succeeded by Muhammad Shaybani, Khan of the Uzbeks
