= Sultan Mahmud Mirza =

15th-century Timurid sultan

- Mirza; Monarch; Padshah
- Reign: 1494–1495
- Predecessor: Sultan Ahmed Mirza
- Successor: Sultan Baysonqor Mirza
- Born: 1453; Samarkand
- Died: January 1495 (aged 41–42); Samarkand
- Spouse: Khanzada Begum; Pasha Begum; Khanzada Begum; Sultan Nigar Khanum; Zuhreh Begi Agha two unnamed
- Issue: Sultan Masud Mirza; Sultan Baysonqor Mirza; Sultan Ali Mirza; Sultan Husayn Mirza; Sultan Uways Khan Mirza; Khanzada Begum; Ak Begum; Ai Begum; Bega Begum; Zainab Sultan Begum; Makhdum Sultan Begum; Rajeb Sultan Begum; Moheb Sultan Begum two unnamed daughters
Names
- Sultan Mahmud Mirza
- Dynasty: Timurid
- Father: Abu Sa'id Mirza

Sultan Mahmud Mirza (Chagatai and Persian: سلطان محمود میرزا; c. 1453 – January 1495) was a Timurid prince from the branch of Transoxiana. He was the second son of Abu Sa'id Mirza, the ruler of the Timurid Empire.

== Biography ==
His father gave him the government of Hisar and Termez in 1459 (according to Babur ), but lost them to Sultan Husayn Mirza Bayqara, who, according Babur, defeated him in two major battles: at Astarabad in 1459, and at Chikman (Sarai) near Andikhud around 1465, after which Mahmud Mirza retreated to Herat. His father restored him in 1466. His father then made an expedition to Azerbaijan in 1468, but was defeated in the winter of 1468 to 1469 and was taken prisoner and was executed on 5 February 1469.

Sultan Mahmud then marched on Herat with the support of Qambar Ali Beg, Governor of Hisar, who had accompanied Abu Sa'id to Iraq and had returned. Mahmud entered that city with an army on 16 March, but when Prince Husayn Baykara of another branch of the Timurids, who had the help of the Uzbeks, approached, he had to withdraw and Baykara proclaimed himself Sultan of Herat on 24 March 1469. Mahmud's brother Sultan Ahmed Mirza, who had been proclaimed ruler of Samarkand, marched from the capital determined to reconquer Herat, but after a discussion with his brother Mahmud, who had arrived in Samarkand, withdrew. Then Amir Khusraw and Qambar Ali Shah, with the consent of Sultan Ahmed Mirza, took Mahmud to Hisar to rule there and after 1497, he dominated the territories south of Quhqa (Quhlugha) from the Kohtin Mountains to the Hindu Kush mountain range, including Termez, Chaghaniyan, Hisan, Khuttalan, Kunduz and Badakhshan.

In 1470, Sultan Mahmud Mirza of Hisar and Umar Shaikh Mirza II of Andijan (Fergana) allied to attack Samarkand but through the mediation of a religious leader they agreed to make peace. 1471 the hakim of Balkh, Ahmad Mushtak (or Mushtaq), known as Khoja Ahrar, revolted against Sultan Husayn Baykara and Mahmud went to support the revolt in Balkh in person. Hussain Baykara besieged Balkh for four months. It is not known when Baykara recovered Balkh.

In 1479 his brother Mirza Abu Bakr died, and he took control of Badakhshan, Kunduz, Khuttalan and Caghaniyan. Upon the death of his other brother Sultan Ahmed Mirza of Samarkand in the middle of July 1494, less than two months after the death of another brother, Umar Shaikh Mirza II of Andijan and Ferghana Valley (8 June 1494), Sultan Mahmud Mirza was presented to Samarkand and proclaimed Sultan, as his brother left no surviving sons. Sultan Mahmud Mirza ruled for six months, dying of disease in January 1495 aged 43. Within eight months, three brothers had died.

According to Babur, he had led two holy wars against Kafiristan, south of Badakhshan, and for this was called Sultan Mahmud Ghazi. The emirs began to dispute power using the princes, the sons of Umar Shaykh (among whom the young famous Babur, later founder of the Mughal Empire) and the sons of Mahmud Mirza.

== Death and aftermath ==
Sultan Mahmud Mirza died in 1495. His son Baysonqor Mirza ascended the throne at Samarkand.

== Family ==
=== Consorts ===
Mahmud had seven consorts:

- Khanzada Begum, daughter of Mir Buzurg of Termez;
- Pasha Begum, daughter of Ali Sher Beg, an amir of Kara Koyunlu, and widow of Muhammadi Mirza Aqqoyunlu;
- Khanzada Begum, granddaughter of Mir Buzurg, the daughter of a brother of Khanzada Begum;
- Sultan Nigar Khanum, daughter of Yunus Khan;
- Zuhreh Begi Agha, an Uzbek, and Mahmud's principle concubine;
- Mother of Rajab Sultan Begum;
- Mother of Mohib Sultan Begum;

=== Sons ===
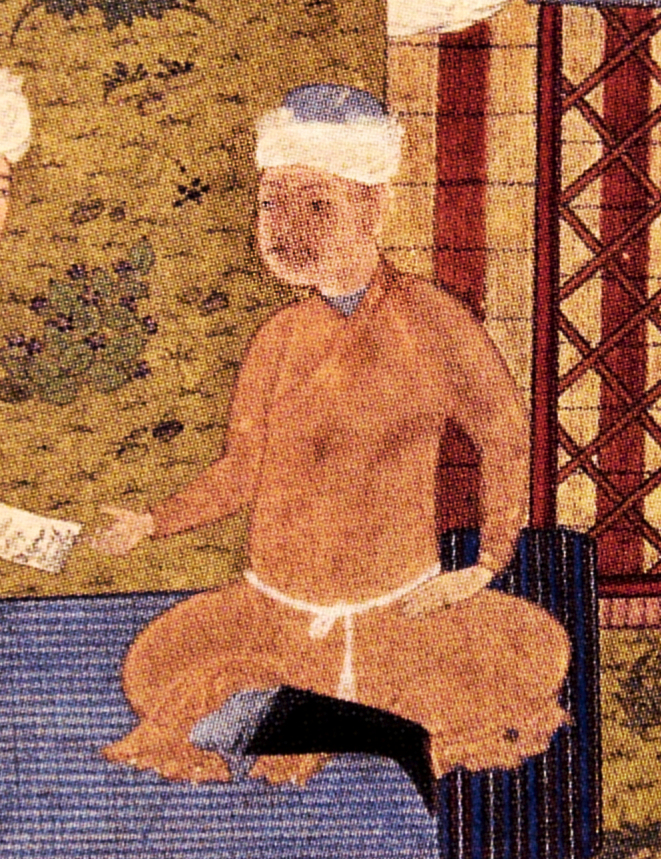
Likely contemporary portrait of Sultan Ali Mirza

He had five sons:

- Sultan Masud Mirza (son of Khanzada Begum)
- Baysonqor Mirza (son of Pasha Begum);
- Sultan Ali Mirza (son of Zuhra Begi Agha);
- Husayn Mirza (died at the age of thirteen, son of the second Khanzada Begum);
- Sultan Ways Mirza known as Mirza Khan (son of Sultan Nigar Khanum);

=== Daughters ===
He had eleven daughters:

- Khanzada Begum, married firstly to Mirza Abu Bakr Dughlat, married secondly to Sayyid Muhammad Mirza (daughter of the second Khanzada Begum);
- Ak Begum (daughter of the second Khanzada Begum);
- Ai Begum, married to Jahangir Mirza, brother of Babur (daughter of the second Khanzada Begum);
- Bega Begum, married to Haider Mirza, son of Sultan Husayn Mirza Bayqara (daughter of the second Khanzada Begum);
- Zainab Sultan Begum, married to Babur (daughter of the second Khanzada Begum);
- A daughter, married to Malik Muhammad Mirza, son of Manuchihr Mirza son of Sultan Muhammad Mirza (daughter of Pasha Begum);
- Makhdum Sultan Begum (daughter of Zuhra Begi Agha);
- Rajab Sultan Begum (daughter of a concubine);
- Mohib Sultan Begum (daughter of a concubine);
- Two unnamed others daughters by Pasha Begum. It is possible that these are Saliha and Dildar Begum, two wives of Babur, but Saliha's existence and Dildar's ancestry are both a matter of debate.

Sultan Mahmud Mirza Timurid dynasty
Preceded by Sultan Ahmed Mirza	Timurid Empire (in Samarkand); 1494-1495	Succeeded by Sultan Baysonqor Mirza
