= Sultan Baysonqor Mirza =

Ninth ruler of the Timurid dynasty in Transoxiana

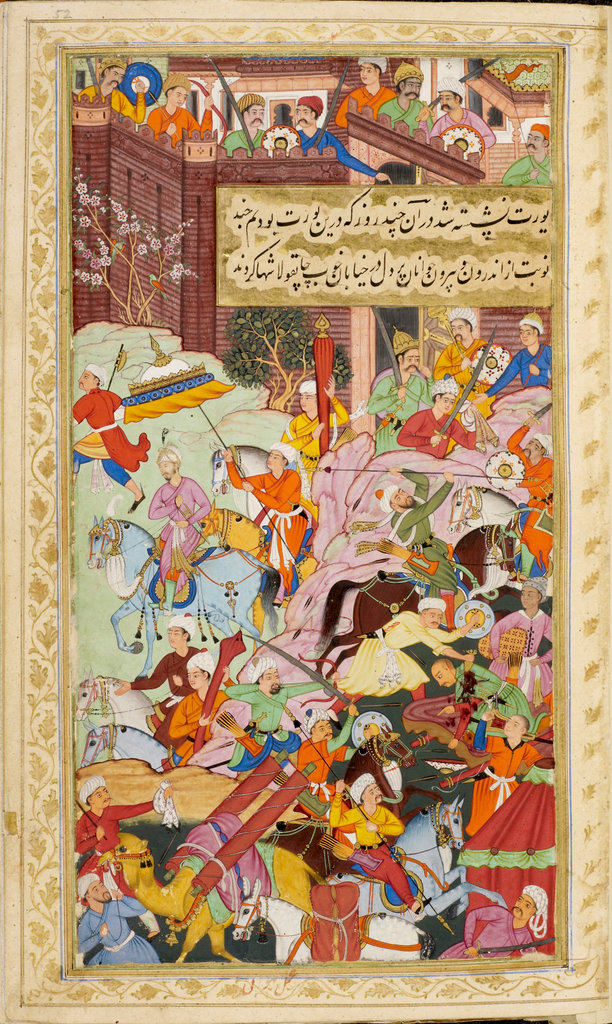
Babur’s army skirmishing with Baisunghur’s army at Khan Yurti, near Samarkand (1496). Mughal painting

Baysonqor Mirza (or Baysunkar Mirza) (1477–1499) was the ninth ruler of the Timurid dynasty in Transoxiana. He ruled in Samarkand between 1495 and 1497.

== Biography ==
Baysunkar Mirza (1477–1499), was the second son of Sultan Mahmud Mirza, the third son of the Timurid Abu Sa'id Mirza. His father ruled large parts of Transoxiana between 1494 and 1495.

Initially, his father gave him Bukhara as an inheritance. In 1495, after the death of his father, the Begs also made him ruler of Samarkand.

The time of his reign was turbulent. In 1495, he repelled an attack against Samarkand by Mahmud, Khan of Western Moghulistan. In 1496, he was forced to fight to retain power against his brother, Sultan Ali Mirza. Initially, he was supported by Sultans Mahdi and Hamza, who were close to the Uzbek Khan Muhammad Shaybani, but later they abandoned him. He subsequently lost Bukhara to his brother Sultan Ali Mirza.

In 1497, Samarkand was besieged for seven months and conquered by his Timurid cousin Babur. Sultan Baysunkar Mirza was forced to flee to Hissar. Here he was well received by Khusroe Shah, but then, after some unsuccessful attempts to recapture Samarkand, Khusroe Shah stopped patronizing him.

=== Death ===
In 1499, Khusroe Shah planned a campaign against Balkh, and asked Sultan Baysunkar Mirza to join him. When they reached the Aubaj river crossing on 17 August 1499, Khusroe Shah attacked Baysunkar and strangled him with a bowstring. Several of his companions were also killed.
Baysunkar Mirza had one wife, but no children.

=== Poetry ===
According to Babur, Baysunkar wrote poetry well, using the pseudonym Adili. In Samarkand, Baysunkar Mirza's ghazals were so widespread that there were few houses without Mirza's verses.

Sultan Baysonqor Mirza Timurid dynasty
Preceded by Sultan Mahmud Mirza	Timurid Empire (in Samarkand); 1495-1497	Succeeded by Babur, Emir of Fergana
