= Timurid dynasty =

Turco-Mongol dynasty (1370–1857)

Timurid dynasty گورکانیان
- Parent house: Barlas
- Country: Timurid Empire; Mughal Empire
- Current region: Central Asia; Greater Iran; Indian peninsula
- Founded: 9 April 1370
- Founder: Timur
- Final ruler: Muzaffar Husayn Mirza (Timurid); Bahadur Shah II (Mughal)
- Titles: Emir; Khan; Beg; Sheikh; Gurkani; Mirza; Sahib Qiran; Sultan; Shah; Padishah
- Traditions: Sunni Islam (Hanafi)
- Dissolution: 1507 (Timurid); 21 September 1857 (Mughal)
- Cadet branches: Mughal dynasty

The Timurid dynasty, self-designated as Gurkani, (Note: (Persian: گورکانیان, romanized: Gurkâniyân, pronounced [guːɹˌkʰɒːniːˈjɒːn]) was the ruling dynasty of the Timurid Empire (1370–1507). It was a Sunni Muslim dynasty from the Barlās clan of Turco-Mongol origin descended from the warlord Timur (also known as Tamerlane).

The word "Gurkani" derives from Gurkân (گورکان)—a Persianized form of the Mongolian word kürgen, meaning 'son-in-law'. This was an honorific title used by the dynasty as the Timurids were in-laws of the line of Genghis Khan, founder of the Mongol Empire, as Timur had married Saray Mulk Khanum, a direct descendant of Genghis Khan.

Members of the Timurid dynasty signaled the Timurid Renaissance, and they were strongly influenced by Persian culture and established two significant empires in history, the Timurid Empire (1370–1507) based in Persia and Central Asia, and the Mughal Empire (1526–1857) based in the Indian subcontinent.

== Origins ==
The origin of the Timurid dynasty goes back to the Mongol tribe known as Barlas, who were remnants of the Mongol army of Genghis Khan, founder of the Mongol Empire. After the Mongol conquest of Central Asia, the Barlas settled in what is today southern Kazakhstan, from Shymkent to Taraz and Almaty, which then came to be known for a time as Moghulistan – "Land of Mongols" in Persian – and intermingled to a considerable degree with the local Turkic and Turkic-speaking population, so that at the time of Timur's reign the Barlas had become thoroughly Turkicized in terms of language and habits.

Additionally, by adopting Islam, the Central Asian Turks and Mongols adopted Persian literary and high culture which had dominated Central Asia since the early days of Islamic influence. Persian literature was instrumental in the assimilation of the Timurid elite into Perso-Islamic courtly culture.

== List of rulers ==
=== Emirs of Timurid Empire ===
No.	Coin	Name	Reign	Life details
1		Timur Beg Gurkani تیمور بیگ گورکانی	9 April 1370 – 18 February 1405 (~35 years)	1320s – 18 February 1405 (aged 85): De facto ruler of Chagatai Khanate under Soyurghatmïsh Khan and Sultan Mahmud Khan.; Adopted the junior Arabic title of Emir.
2		Pir Muhammad پیر محمد	18 February 1405 – 22 February 1407 (~2 years)	1376 – 22 February 1407 (aged 31): Grandson of Timur through Jahangir Mirza, and his nominated heir.
3		Khalil Sultan خلیل سلطان	18 February 1405 – 1409 (~4 years)	13 August 1384 – 3 November 1411 (aged 27): Grandson of Timur through Miran Shah.; Seized and ruled from Samarkand against Pir Muhammad.
4		Shahrukh Mirza شاھرخ میرزا	20 February 1405 – 13 March 1447 (~42 years)	20 August 1377 – 13 March 1447 (aged 69): Son of Timur
5		Ulugh Beg Mirza الغ بیگ میرزا	13 March 1447 – 27 October 1449 (~2 years)	22 March 1394 – 27 October 1449 (aged 55): Son of Shahrukh Mirza

=== Emirs of Greater Khorasan (Herat) ===
1. Sultan Muhammad, nephew of Ulugh Beg, 1447–1451
2. Babur Mirza, brother of Sultan Muhammad, 1451–1457
3. Mahmud Mirza, son of Babur Mirza, 1457
4. Ibrahim Mirza, nephew of Babur Mirza, 1457–1459
5. Abu Sa'id Mirza, grandson of Miran Shah, son of Timur, 1459–1469
6. Husayn Bayqara Mirza, grandson of Umar Shaikh, son of Timur, 1469
7. Yadgar Muhammad Mirza, son of Sultan Muhammad, 1470
8. Husayn Bayqara Mirza (second reign), 1470–1506
9. Badi' al-Zaman Mirza, son of Bayqara Mirza, 1506–1507
10. Muzaffar Husayn Mirza, son of Bayqara Mirza, 1507

In 1507, the capital Herat fell to Uzbek Khanate of Bukhara under Muhammad Shaybani Khan.

=== Emirs of Transoxiana (Samarkand) ===
1. Abd al-Latif Mirza, son of Ulugh Beg, 1449–1450
2. Abdullah Mirza, nephew of Abd al-Latif, 1450–1451
3. Abu Sa'id Mirza, grandson of Miran Shah, son of Timur, 1451–1469

After his death, Abu Sa'id's sons split Transoxiana among themselves.

=== Emirs of Samarkand, Bukhara and Hissar ===
1. Ahmad Mirza, son of Abu Sa'id Mirza, 1469–1494
2. Baysonqor Mirza, son of Mahmud Mirza, 1495–1497 (only Samarkand)
3. Ali Mirza, son of Mahmud Mirza, 1495–1500 (only Bukhara)
4. Masud Mirza, son of Mahmud Mirza, 1495–1500 (only Hissar)

By 1501, Samarkand, Bukhara and Hissar were conquered by the Uzbek Khanate of Bukhara under Muhammad Shaybani Khan.

=== Emirs of Ferghana ===
1. Umar Shaikh Mirza, son of Abu Sa'id Mirza, 1469–1494
2. Babur, son of Umar Shaikh Mirza, 1494–1497
3. Jahangir Mirza, brother of Babur, 1487–1503

In 1503, Ferghana fell to Uzbek Khanate of Bukhara under Muhammad Shaybani Khan.

=== Emirs of Balkh ===
1. Mahmud Mirza, son of Abu Sa'id Mirza, 1469–1495
2. Khusrau Shah, usurper, 1495–1504
3. Babur, son of Umar Shaikh Mirza, 1504

In 1504, Balkh fell to Uzbek Khanate of Bukhara under Muhammad Shaybani Khan.

=== Emirs of Kabul ===
1. Ulugh Mirza, son of Abu Sa'id Mirza, 1469–1502
2. Abd al-Razzaq, son of Ulugh Mirza, 1502
3. Muqim Arghun, usurper, 1502–1504
4. Babur, son of Umar Shaikh Mirza, 1504–1530

In 1526, Babur moved into India and conquered the Dehli Sultanate, establishing the Mughal empire.

=== Mughal Emperors ===
1. Babur, son of Umar Shaikh Mirza, 1526–1530
2. Humayun, son of Babur, 1530–1540, 1555–1556 (Note: Interregnum by Suri dynasty between 1540 and 1555)
3. Akbar, son of Humayun, 1556–1605
4. Jahangir, son of Akbar, 1605–1627
5. Shah Jahan, son of Jahangir, 1628–1658
6. Aurangzeb Alamgir, son of Shah Jahan, 1658–1707
7. Azam Shah, son of Aurangzeb, 1707
8. Bahadur Shah I, son of Aurangzeb, 1707–1712
9. Jahandar Shah, son of Bahadur Shah I, 1712–1713
10. Farrukhsiyar, grandson of Bahadur Shah I, 1713–1719
11. Rafi ud-Darajat, grandson of Bahadur Shah I, 1719
12. Shah Jahan II, brother of Rafi ud-Darajat, 1719
13. Muhammad Shah, grandson of Bahadur Shah I, 1719–1748
14. Ahmad Shah, son of Muhammad Shah, 1748–1754
15. Alamgir II, son of Jahandar Shah, 1754–1759
16. Shah Jahan III, grandson of Bahadur Shah I, 1759–1760
17. Shah Alam II, son of Alamgir II, 1760–1788, 1788–1806
18. Jahan Shah, son of Ahmad Shah Bahadur, 1788
19. Akbar II, son of Shah Alam II, 1806–1837
20. Bahadur Shah II, son of Akbar II, 1837–1857

== Family Tree ==
House of Barlas

Timurid Empire
Timurid Empire of Farghana
Timurid Empire of Kabul
Timurid Empire of Herat
Timurid Empire of Samarkand
Timurid Empire of Transoxiana
Timurid Empire of Hissar
Timurid Empire of Khurasan
Mughal Empire

Timur r. 1370–1405
Jahangir	Umar-Shaykh	Miran-Shah	Shah-Rukh r. 1405–1447
Pir-Muhammad r. 1405–1407	Bayqara	Khalil r. 1405–1409	Muhammad	Ulugh-Beg I r. 1447–1449	Ibrahim	Baysunghur
Mansur	Abu Sa'id r. 1451–1459 r. 1459–1469	Abdul-Latif r. 1449–1450	Abdullah r. 1450–1451	Ala ad-Dawla r. 1447–1448	Muhammad r. 1449–1451	Babur I r. 1449–1449, 1451–1457 r. 1447–1457
Husayn-Bayqara r. 1469–1470, 1470–1506	Ahmad r. 1469–1494	Mahmud r. 1469–1469 r. 1469–1495 r. 1494–1495	Umar-Shaykh r. 1469–1494	Ulugh-Beg II r. 1469–1502	Ibrahim r. 1457–1459 r. 1457–1459	Yadigar-Muhammad r. 1470–1470	Shah-Mahmud r. 1457–1457 r. 1457–1457
Badi az-Zaman r. 1506–1507	Muzaffar-Husayn r. 1506–1507	Mas'ud r. 1495–1497	Baysunghur r. 1495–1497 r. 1497–1499	Ali r. 1497–1500	Babur II r. 1494–1497 r. 1497–1497, 1511–1512 r. 1504–1526 r. 1526–1530	Jahangir r. 1497–1504	Abdur-Razaq r. 1502–1504
Humayun r. 1530–1540, 1555–1556
Akbar I r. 1556–1605
Jahangir r. 1605–1627
Shah-Jahan I r. 1628–1658
Aurangzeb; Alamgir I r. 1658–1707
Bahadur-Shah I Shah-Alam I r. 1707–1712	Azam-Shah r. 1707–1707	Kam-Bakhsh
Jahandar-Shah r. 1712–1713	Azim ash-Shan	Rafi ash-Shan	Jahan-Shah	Muhi as-Sunnat
Alamgir II r. 1754–1759	Faruqsiyar r. 1713–1719	Shah-Jahan II r. 1719–1719	Rafi ad-Darajat r. 1719–1719	Muhammad-Shah r. 1719–1748	Shah-Jahan III r. 1759–1760
Shah-Alam II r. 1760–1788, 1788–1806	Ahmad-Shah r. 1748–1754
Akbar II r. 1806–1837	Shah-Jahan IV r. 1788–1788
Bahadur-Shah II r. 1837–1857

== See also ==
- Borjigin
- List of Sunni Muslim dynasties
- Mughal Empire
- Muhammad Khwaja
- Timur
- Timurid Empire
- Turco-Mongol
- Turco-Persian
- House of Babur
