= Akbar =

Mughal emperor from 1556 to 1605

- Padishah; Ghazi; Shahenshah-e-Hind (King of Kings of India)
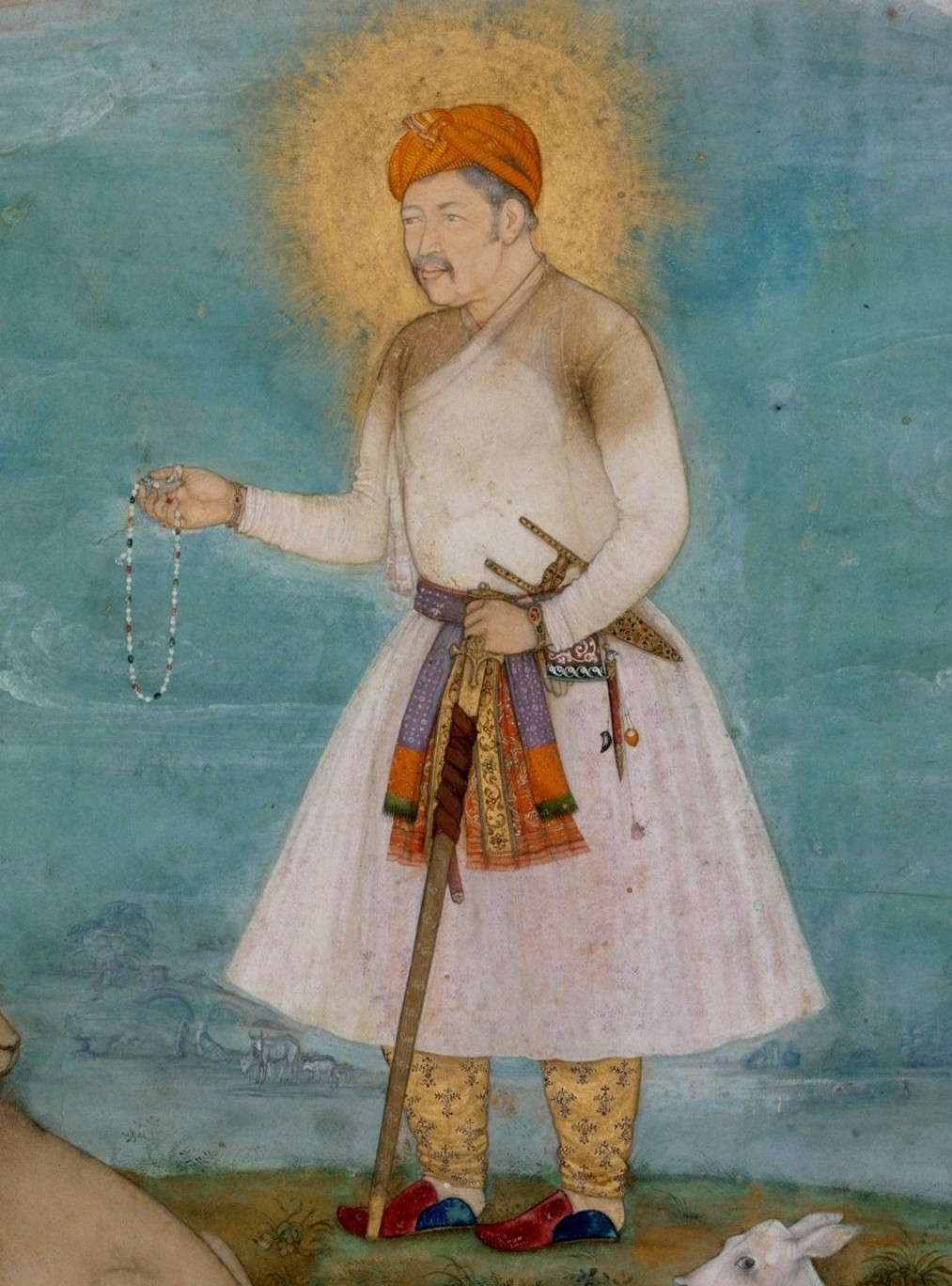
- Akbar with a lion and a calf, by Govardhan, c. 1630

Mughal emperor
- Reign: 11 February 1556 – 27 October 1605
- Coronation: 14 February 1556; Takht-i-Akbari, Kalanaur
- Predecessor: Humayun; Hemu (as ruler of Delhi)
- Successor: Jahangir
- Regent: Bairam Khan (1556–1560)
- Born: Jalal-ud-din Muhammad; 15 October 1542 (Note: Official sources, such as contemporary biographer Abu'l-Fazl, record Akbar's birth name and date as Jalal ud-din Muhammad Akbar and 15 October 1542. However, based on recollections of Humayun's personal attendant Jauhar, historian Vincent Arthur Smith holds that Akbar was born on 23 November 1542 (the fourteenth day of Sha'aban, which had a full moon) and was originally named Badr ud-din ("The full moon of religion"). According to Smith, the recorded date of birth was changed at the time of Akbar's circumcision ceremony in March 1546 to throw off astrologers and sorcerers, and his name was accordingly changed to Jalal ud-din ("Splendour of Religion")); Amarkot, Amarkot Kingdom, Rajputana (modern-day Umerkot, Sindh, Pakistan)
- Died: 27 October 1605 (aged 63); Fatehpur Sikri, Agra Subah, Mughal Empire (modern-day Uttar Pradesh, India)
- Burial: November 1605; Akbar's Tomb, Sikandra, Agra, India
- Consorts: Ruqaiya Sultan Begum (m. 1556); Salima Sultan Begum (m. 1561); Mariam-uz-Zamani (m. 1562)
- Wives: Raj Kunwari (m. 1570); Nathi Bai (m. 1570); Bhakkari Begum (m. 1572); Qasima Banu Begum (m. 1575); Gauhar-un-Nissa Begum; Bibi Daulat Shad; Rukmavati; several others
- Issue Detail: Hassan Mirza; Hussain Mirza; Jahangir; Shahzada Khanum; Murad Mirza; Shakr-un-Nissa Begum; Daniyal Mirza; Aram Banu Begum
Names
- Abu'l-Fath Jalal-ud-din Muhammad Akbar
Posthumous name
- Arsh-Ashyani (lit. 'One who nests on the divine throne')
- House: Mughal
- Dynasty: Timurid
- Father: Humayun
- Mother: Hamida Banu Begum
- Religion: Sunni Islam; Din-i-Ilahi
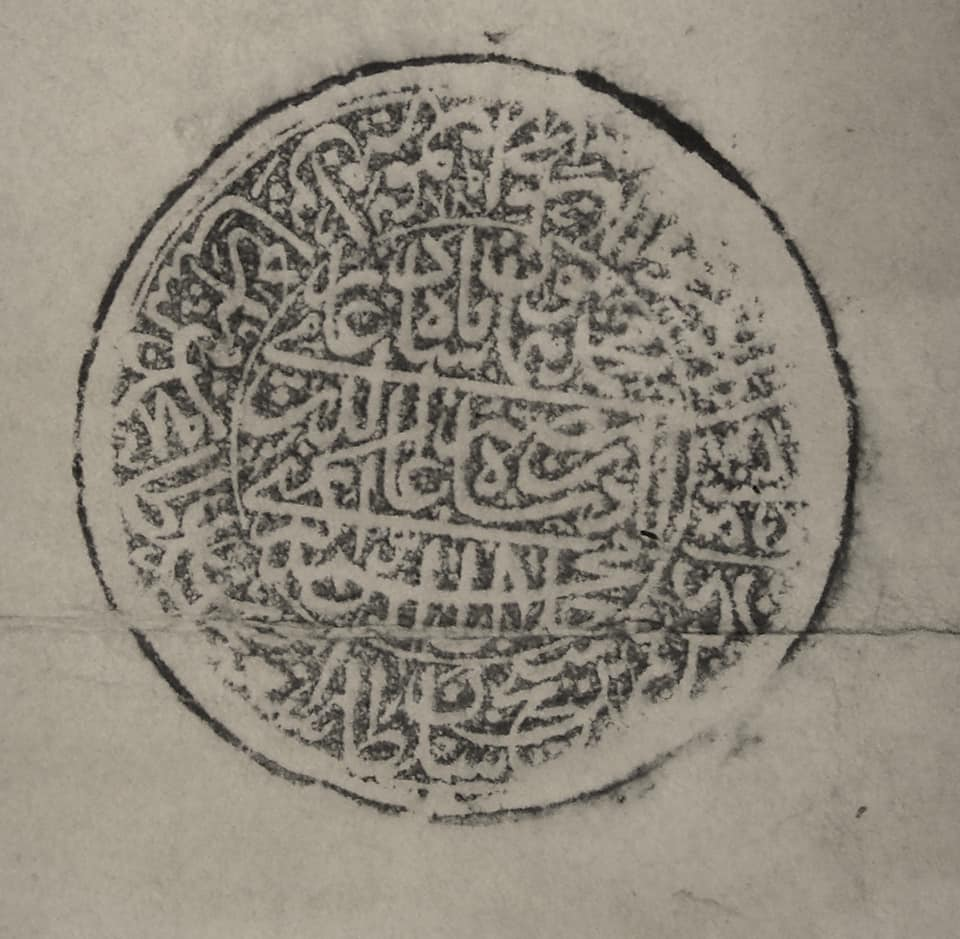
- Seal
- Military career
- Allegiance: Mughal Empire
- Branch: Mughal Army
- Conflicts: See list: Panipat (1556); Mankot (1557); Thanesar (1567); Mughal–Rajput Wars; Merta (1562); Mughal invasion of Marwar (1562–1583); Chittorgarh (1567–1568); Ranthambore (1568); Gujarat (1572–73); Bengal (1572–76); Tukaroi (1575); Rajmahal (1576)

Akbar (Note: Persian pronunciation: [ak.baɾ]) (Jalal-ud-Din Muhammad Akbar, 15 October 1542 – 27 October 1605), also known as Akbar the Great, was the third Mughal emperor, who reigned from 1556 to 1605. Akbar succeeded his father, Humayun, under a regent, Bairam Khan, who helped the young emperor expand and consolidate Mughal domains in the Indian subcontinent. He is generally considered one of the greatest Mughal emperors.

Akbar gradually enlarged the Mughal Empire to include much of the Indian subcontinent through Mughal military, political, cultural, and economic dominance. To unify the vast Mughal state, Akbar established a centralised system of administration and adopted a policy of conciliating conquered rulers through marriage and diplomacy. To preserve peace and order in a religiously and culturally diverse empire, he adopted policies that won him the support of his non-Muslim subjects, including abolishing the sectarian tax and appointing them to high civil and military posts.

Under Akbar, Mughal India developed a strong and stable economy, which tripled in size and wealth, leading to commercial expansion and greater patronage of an Indo-Persian culture. Akbar's courts at Delhi, Agra, and Fatehpur Sikri attracted holy men of many faiths, poets, architects, and artisans, and became known as centres of the arts, letters, and learning. Timurid and Perso-Islamic culture began to merge and blend with indigenous Indian elements into a distinct style of Mughal arts, including painting and architecture. Disillusioned with orthodox Islam and perhaps hoping to bring about religious unity within his empire, Akbar promulgated Din-i Ilahi, a syncretic creed derived mainly from Islam and Hinduism as well as elements of Zoroastrianism and Christianity.

Akbar was succeeded as emperor by his son, Prince Salim, later known as Jahangir.

== Early years ==
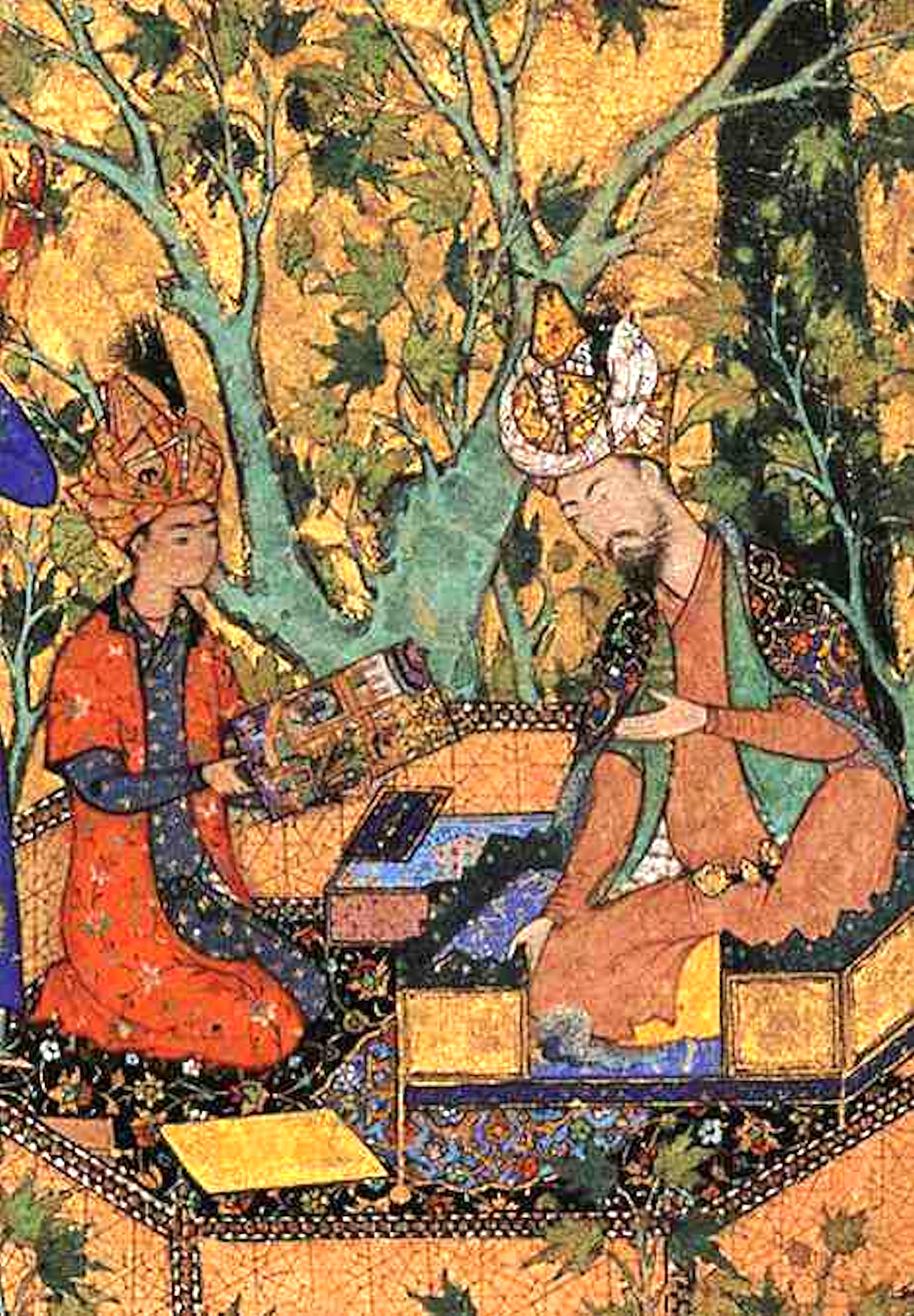
Contemporary portrait of Akbar as a boy, offering a painting to his father Humayun while in Kabul. Painted in 1550–56

After Mughal Emperor Humayun was defeated at Chausa (1539) and Kannauj (1540) by the forces of Sher Shah Suri, Humayun fled westward to modern-day Sindh. There, he met and married the 14-year-old Hamida Banu Begum, daughter of Shaikh Ali Akbar Jami, a Persian teacher of Humayun's younger brother Hindal Mirza. Jalal ud-din Muhammad Akbar was born to them the next year on 15 October 1542 (the fifth day of Rajab, 949 AH) at the Rajput Fortress of Amarkot in Rajputana (in modern-day Sindh), where his parents had been given refuge by the local Hindu ruler Rana Prasad.

During the extended period of Humayun's exile, Akbar was brought up in Kabul by his paternal uncles, Kamran Mirza and Askari Mirza, and aunts, in particular, Kamran Mirza's wife. He spent his youth learning to hunt, run, and fight, and although he never learned to read or write, when he retired in the evening, he would have someone read to him. On 20 November 1551, Humayun's youngest brother, Hindal Mirza, died in a battle against Kamran Mirza's forces. Upon hearing the news of his brother's death, Humayun was overwhelmed with grief.

Following the mourning period for Hindal in 1551, Humayun appointed the nine-year-old Akbar as governor of Ghazni and transferred to him the retainers, lands, and military command previously held by Hindal Mirza. Around the same time, Humayun arranged Akbar's betrothal to Hindal's daughter, Ruqaiya Sultan Begum. However, contemporary and later sources clarify that the transfer of Hindal's assets was a strategic elevation of Akbar within the Mughal imperial system, rather than a marital inheritance from this betrothal. The marriage itself was solemnized several years later in Jalandhar, Punjab, when both were about fourteen years old.

Following chaos over the succession of Sher Shah Suri's son Islam Shah, Humayun reconquered Delhi in 1555, leading an army partly provided by his Persian ally Tahmasp I. A few months later, Humayun died. Akbar's guardian, Bairam Khan, concealed his death to prepare for Akbar's succession. Akbar succeeded Humayun on 14 February 1556, while in the midst of a war against Sikandar Shah to reclaim the Mughal throne. In Kalanaur, Punjab, the 14-year-old Akbar was enthroned by Bairam Khan on a newly constructed platform (which still stands) and was proclaimed Shahanshah (Persian for "King of Kings"). Bairam Khan ruled on his behalf until he came of age.

== Ancestry ==
Ancestors of Akbar

8. Umar Shaikh Mirza II
4. Babur
9. Qutlugh Nigar Khanum
2. Humayun
5. Maham Begum
1. Akbar I
6.Shaikh Ali Akbar Jami
3. Hamida Banu Begum
7. Mah Afroz Begum

== Military campaigns ==
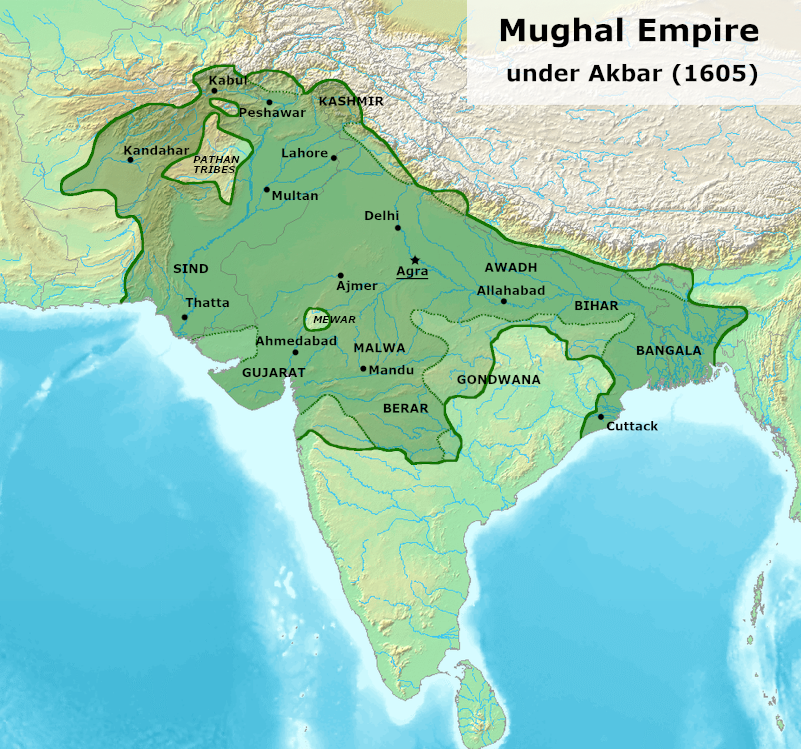
Mughal Empire under Akbar, 1605. Areas that were only partially integrated are indicated by lighter shading and dotted lines.

=== Military innovations ===
Akbar's military campaigns consolidated Mughal rule in the Indian subcontinent. Akbar introduced organisational changes to the mansabdari system, establishing a hierarchical scale of military and civil ranks.

Organisational reforms were accompanied by innovations in cannons, fortifications, and the use of elephants. Akbar also took an interest in matchlocks and effectively employed them during various conflicts. He sought the help of the Ottomans, as well as Europeans, especially the Portuguese and Italians, in procuring advanced firearms and artillery. Akbar's vizier Abul Fazl once declared that "with the exception of Turkey, there is perhaps no country in which its guns has more means of securing the Government than [India]." Scholars and historians have used the term "gunpowder empire" to analyse the success of the Mughals in India.

=== North India ===
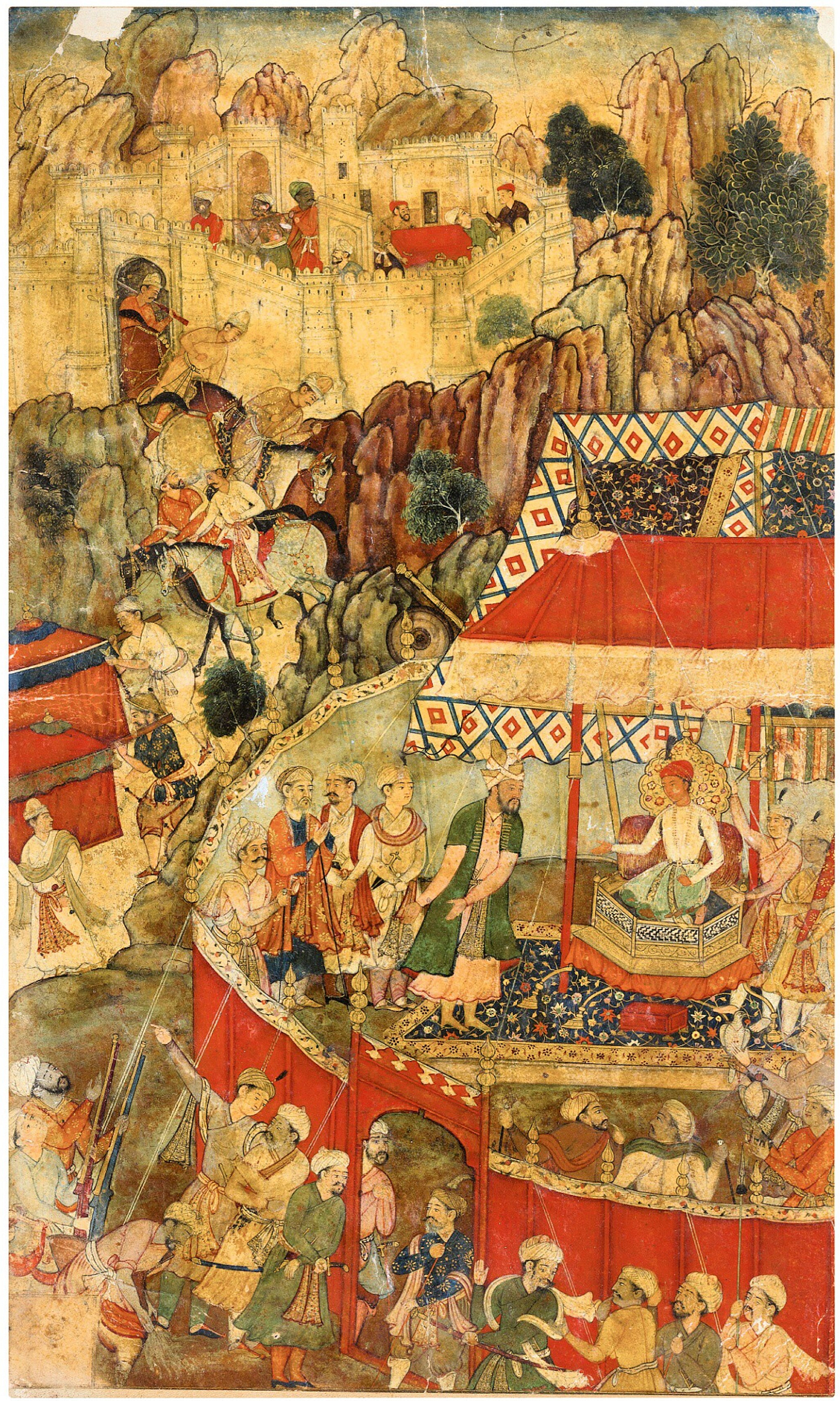
Afghan troops of the Sur Empire surrendering to the Mughal forces of Akbar at the Siege of Mankot (1557). Akbarnama (1590–95)

Akbar's father Humayun had regained control of the Punjab, Delhi, and Agra with Safavid support, but Mughal rule was still precarious when Akbar took the throne. When the Surs reconquered Agra and Delhi following the death of Humayun, Akbar's young age and the lack of military assistance from the Mughal stronghold of Kabul—which was in the midst of an invasion by the ruler of Badakhshan, Prince Mirza Suleiman—aggravated the situation. When his regent, Bairam Khan, called a council of war to marshall the Mughal forces, none of Akbar's chieftains approved. Bairam Khan was ultimately able to prevail over the nobles and it was decided that the Mughals would march against the strongest of the Sur rulers, Sikandar Shah Suri, in Punjab. Delhi was left under the regency of Tardi Baig Khan. Sikandar Shah Suri, his army weakened by earlier lost battles, withdrew to avoid combat as the Mughal army approached.

Akbar also faced Hemu, a minister and general of one of the Sur rulers, who had proclaimed himself Hindu emperor and expelled the Mughals from the Indo-Gangetic Plains. Urged by Bairam Khan, who re-marshalled the Mughal army before Hemu could consolidate his position, Akbar marched on Delhi to reclaim it. His army, led by Bairam Khan, defeated Hemu and the Sur army on 5 November 1556 at the Second Battle of Panipat, 50 miles (80 km) north of Delhi. Soon after the battle, Mughal forces occupied Delhi and then Agra. Akbar made a triumphant entry into Delhi, where he stayed for a month. Then, he and Bairam Khan returned to Punjab to deal with Sikandar Shah Suri, who had become active again. In the next six months, the Mughals won another major battle against Sikander, who then fled east to Bengal. Akbar and his forces occupied Lahore and then seized Multan in the Punjab. In 1558, Akbar took possession of Ajmer, the aperture to Rajputana, after the defeat and flight of its Muslim ruler. The Mughals also besieged and defeated the Sur forces in control of Gwalior Fort, a stronghold north of the Narmada river.

Royal begums (ladies), along with the families of Mughal amirs, were brought from Kabul to India at the time, "so that men might become settled and be restrained in some measure from departing to a country to which they were accustomed", according to Fazl. Akbar made clear that he would stay in India, reintroducing the historical legacy of the Timurid Renaissance, in contrast to his grandfather and father, who reigned as transient rulers.

=== Central India ===
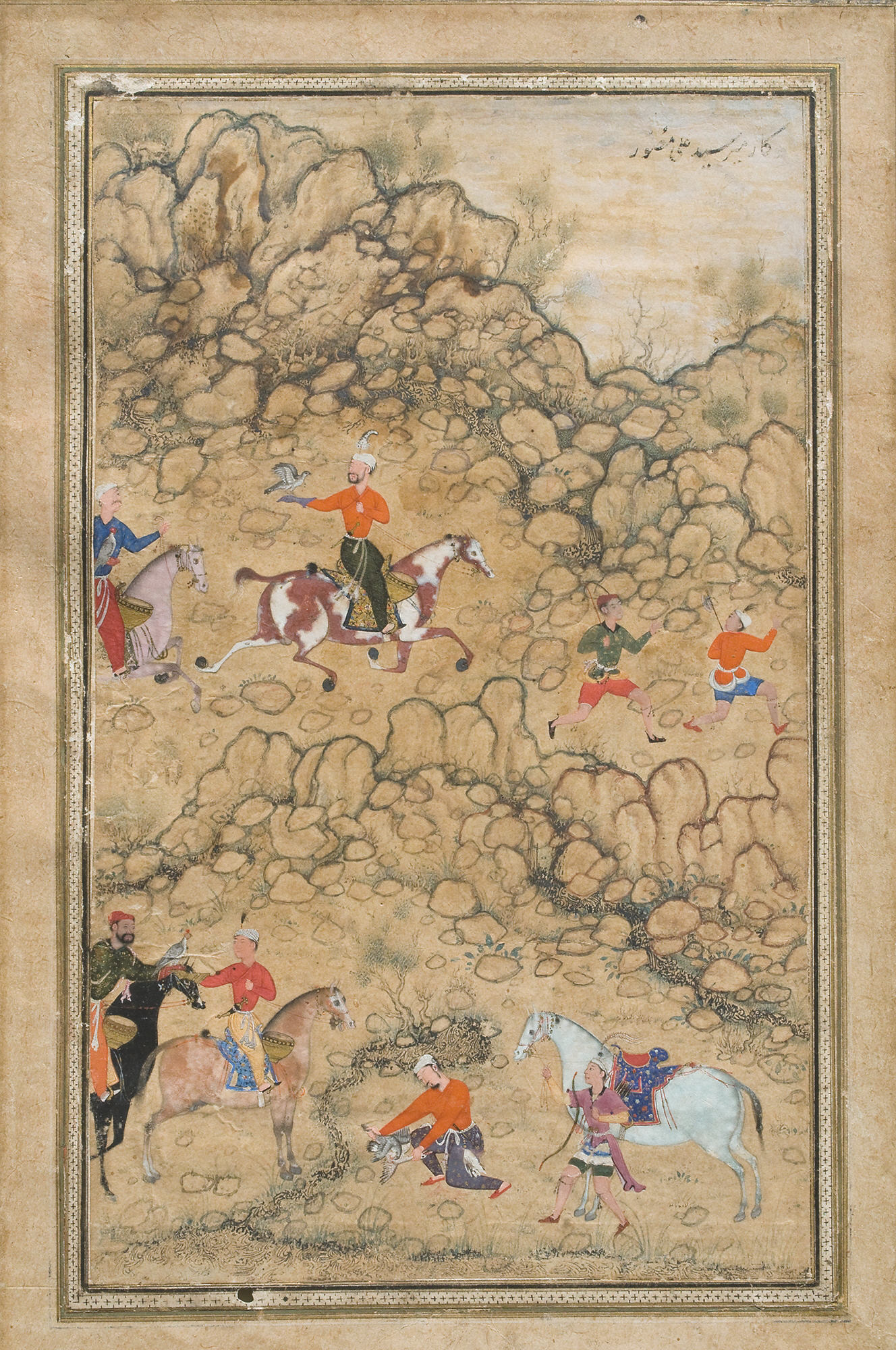
Akbar hawking with Mughal chieftains and nobleman, accompanied by his guardian Bairam Khan.

By 1559, the Mughals had launched a drive to the south into Rajputana and Malwa. However, Akbar's disputes with his regent, Bairam Khan, temporarily put an end to the expansion. The young emperor, at the age of eighteen, wanted to take a more active part in managing the Empire's affairs. Urged on by his foster mother, Maham Anga, and other relatives, Akbar dismissed Bairam Khan following a dispute at court in the spring of 1560 and ordered him to leave on Hajj to Mecca. Bairam Khan was prepared to comply, but people who resented him and hoped for his downfall goaded him into rebellion against Akbar. Bairam Khan was defeated by the Mughal army in the Punjab and forced to submit. Akbar forgave him and gave him the option of either continuing in his court or resuming his pilgrimage; Bairam Khan chose the latter. Bairam Khan was assassinated on his way to Mecca, by a group of Afghans led by Mubarak Khan Lohani, whose father had been killed while fighting with the Mughals at the Battle of Machhiwara in 1555.

In 1560, Akbar resumed military operations. A Mughal army under the command of his foster brother, Adham Khan, and a Mughal commander, Pir Muhammad Khan, began the Mughal conquest of Malwa. The Afghan ruler, Baz Bahadur, was defeated at the Battle of Sarangpur and fled to Khandesh for refuge, leaving behind his harem, treasure, and war elephants. Despite initial success, Akbar was ultimately displeased with the aftermath of the campaign; his foster brother retained all of the spoils and followed through with the Central Asian practice of slaughtering the surrendered garrison, their wives and children, and many Muslim theologians and Sayyids, who were descendants of Muhammad. Akbar personally rode to Malwa to confront Adham Khan and relieve him of command. Pir Muhammad Khan was then sent in pursuit of Baz Bahadur, but was beaten back by the alliance of the rulers of Khandesh and Berar. Baz Bahadur temporarily regained control of Malwa until, in the next year, Akbar sent another Mughal army to invade and annexe the kingdom. Malwa became a province of the nascent imperial administration of Akbar's regime. Baz Bahadur survived as a refugee at various courts until, eight years later in 1570, he took service under Akbar. When Adham Khan confronted Akbar following another dispute in late 1561, the emperor threw him from a terrace into the palace courtyard at Agra. Still alive, Adham Khan was dragged up and thrown to the courtyard once again by Akbar to ensure his death.

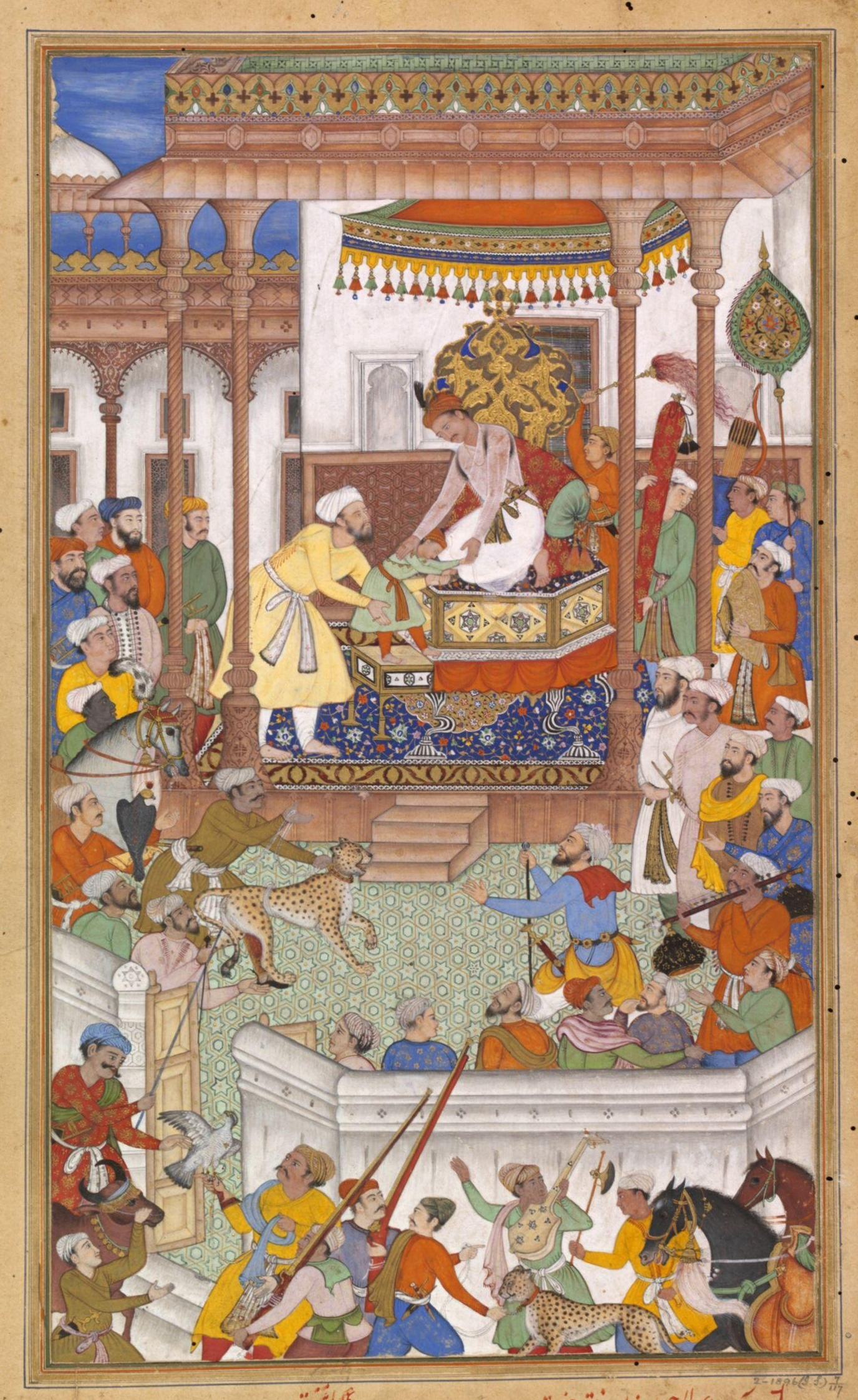
Young Abdul Rahim Khan-i-Khanan, son of Bairam Khan, being received by Akbar.

After Adham Khan's death, Akbar distributed authority among specialised ministerial posts relating to different aspects of imperial governance to prevent any one noble from becoming too powerful. When a powerful clan of Uzbek chiefs broke out in rebellion in 1564, Akbar routed them in Malwa and then Bihar. He pardoned the rebellious leaders, hoping to conciliate them, but they rebelled again; Akbar quelled their second uprising. Following a third revolt, during which they proclaimed Mirza Muhammad Hakim—Akbar's brother and the Mughal ruler of Kabul— to be their king, several Uzbek chieftains were slain. Simultaneously, the Mirzas, a group of Akbar's distant cousins who held important fiefs near Agra, rebelled and were defeated by Akbar. Several rebel leaders were trampled to death under elephants. In 1566, Akbar moved to meet the forces of his brother, Muhammad Hakim, who had marched into the Punjab with the intention of seizing the imperial throne. Following a brief confrontation, Muhammad Hakim accepted Akbar's supremacy and retreated back to Kabul.

In 1564, Mughal forces began the conquest of Garha, a thinly populated, hilly area in central India that was of interest to the Mughals because of its herd of wild elephants. The territory was ruled over by Raja Vir Narayan, a minor, and his mother, Durgavati, a Rajput warrior queen of the Gonds. Akbar did not personally lead the campaign because he was preoccupied with the Uzbek rebellion, leaving the expedition in the hands of Asaf Khan, the Mughal governor of Kara. Durgavati committed suicide after her defeat at the Battle of Damoh, while Raja Vir Narayan was slain at the Fall of Chauragarh, the mountain fortress of the Gonds. The Mughals seized immense wealth, including an uncalculated amount of gold and silver, jewels, and 1,000 elephants. Kamala Devi, a younger sister of Durgavati, was sent to the Mughal harem. The brother of Durgavati's deceased husband was installed as the Mughal administrator of the region.

As with Malwa, Akbar entered into a dispute with his vassals over the conquest of Gondwana. Asaf Khan was accused of keeping most of the treasures and sending back only 200 elephants to Akbar. When summoned to give accounts, he fled Gondwana. He went first to the Uzbeks, then returned to Gondwana where he was pursued by Mughal forces. Finally, he submitted and Akbar restored him to his previous position.

==== Assassination attempt ====
In January 1564, an assassin shot an arrow at Akbar, which pierced his right shoulder, as he was returning from a visit to the Dargah of Hazrat Nizamuddin near Delhi. The Emperor ordered the apprehended assassin, a slave of Mirza Sharfuddin—a noble in Akbar's court whose recent rebellion had been suppressed—to be beheaded.

=== Rajputana ===
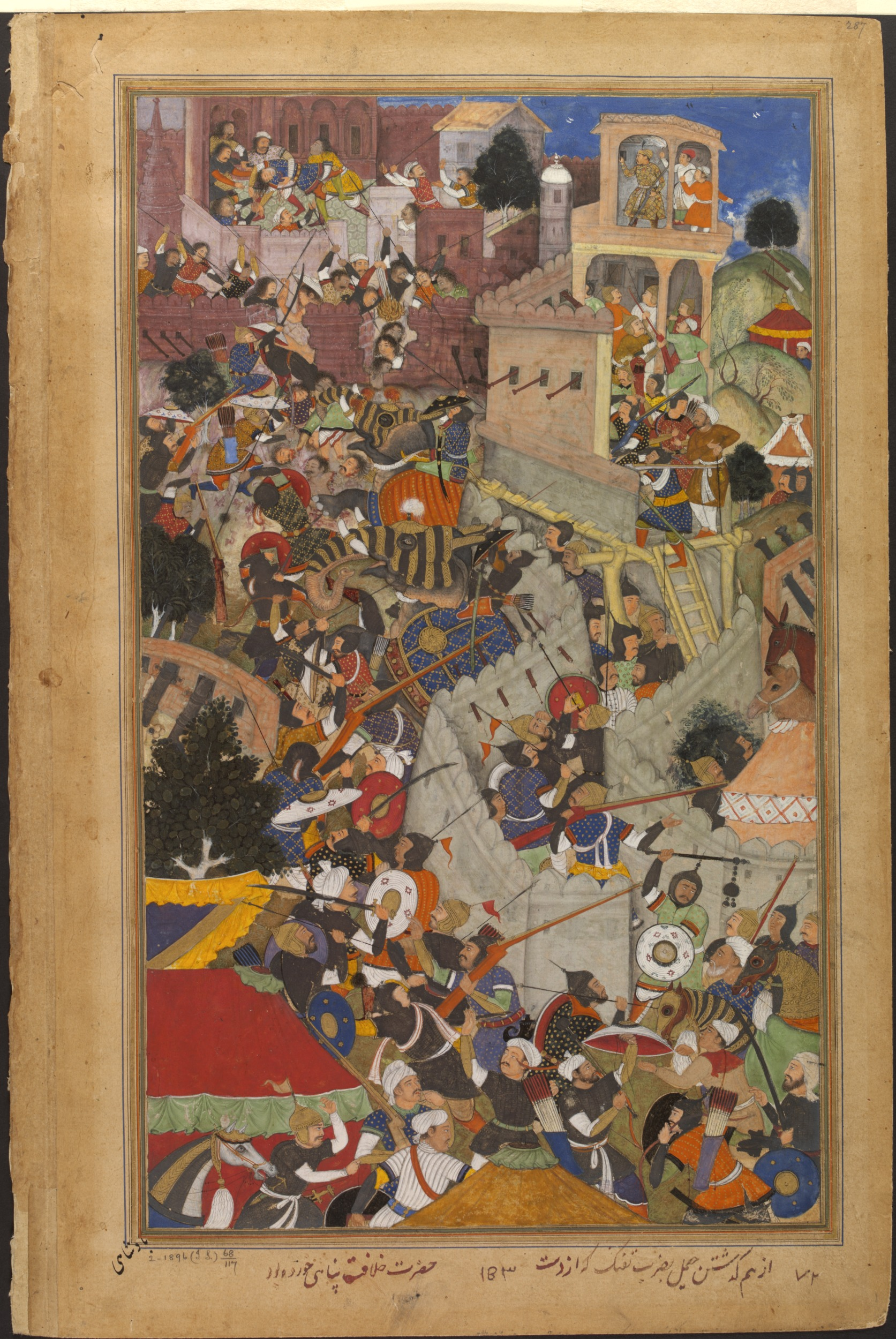
Mughal Emperor Akbar shoots the Rajput warrior Jaimal during the Siege of Chittorgarh in 1568.

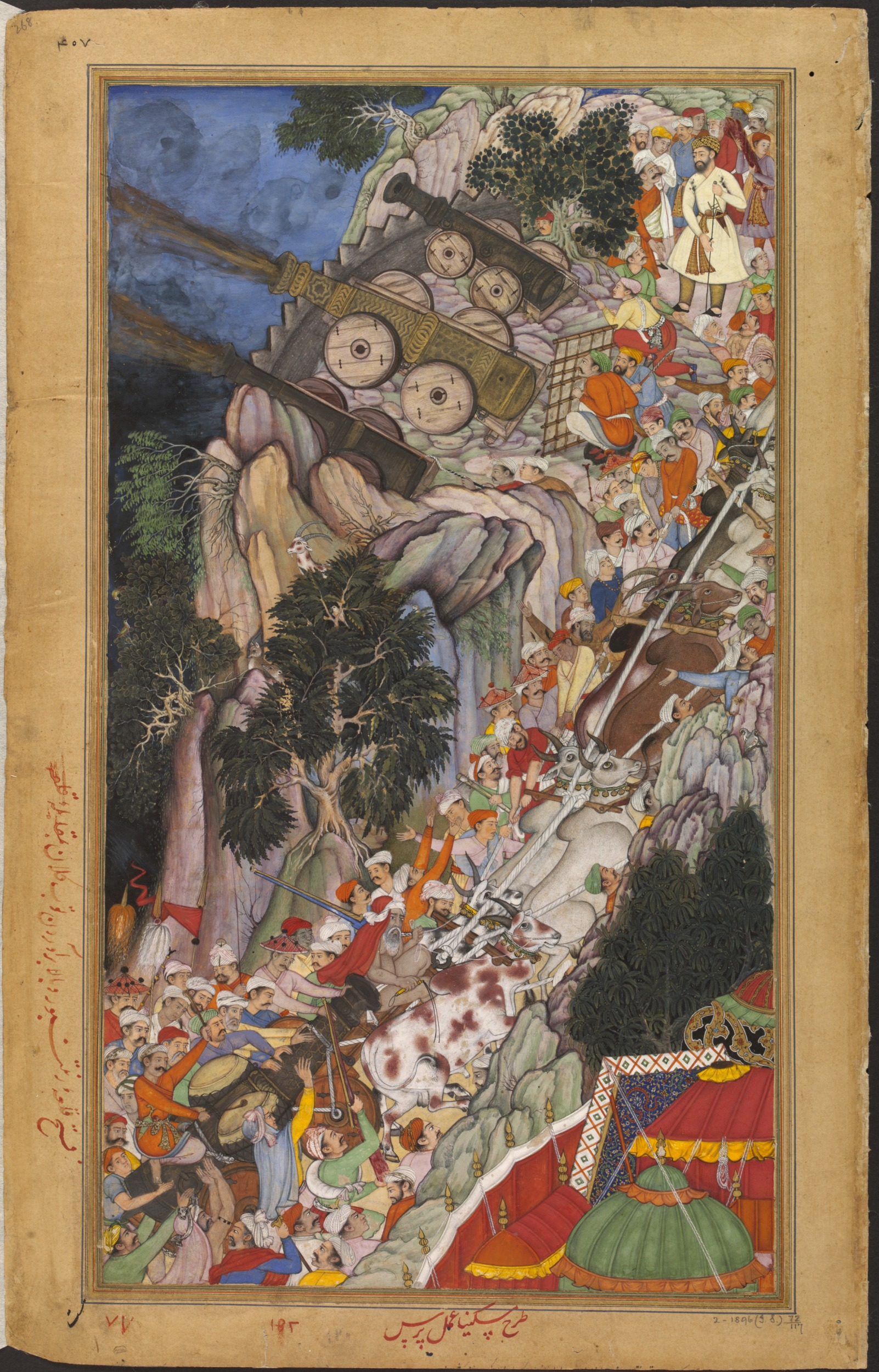
Bullocks dragging siege-guns uphill during Akbar's attack on Ranthambhor Fort in 1568.

Having established Mughal rule over northern India, Akbar turned his attention to the conquest of Rajputana, which was strategically important as it was a rival centre of power that flanked the Indo-Gangetic plains. The Mughals had already established domination over parts of northern Rajputana in Mewat, Ajmer, and Nagor. Akbar sought to conquer Rajputana's heartlands, which had rarely previously submitted to the Muslim rulers of the Delhi Sultanate. Beginning in 1561, the Mughals actively engaged the Rajputs in warfare and diplomacy. Most Rajput states accepted Akbar's suzerainty; however, the rulers of Mewar and Marwar—Udai Singh II and Chandrasen Rathore—remained outside the imperial fold.

Udai Singh was descended from the Sisodia ruler, Rana Sanga, who had fought Babur at the Battle of Khanwa in 1527. As the head of the Sisodia clan, he possessed the highest ritual status of all the Rajput kings and chieftains in India. The Mughals viewed defeating Udai Singh as essential to asserting their imperial authority among the Rajputs. During this period of his reign, Akbar was still devoted to Islam and sought to impress the superiority of his faith over what were regarded by contemporaries as the most prestigious warriors in Hinduism.

In 1567, Akbar attacked the Chittor Fort in Mewar. The fortress-capital of Mewar was of strategic importance as it lay on the shortest route from Agra to Gujarat and was also considered a key to holding the interior parts of Rajputana. Udai Singh retreated to the hills of Mewar, leaving two Rajput warriors, Jaimal and Patta, in charge of the defence of his capital. Chittorgarh fell in February 1568 after a siege of four months. The fall of Chittor was proclaimed by Akbar as "the victory of Islam over infidels [i.e., non-Muslims]." In his Fathnama (dispatches announcing victory) issued on 9 March 1575 conveying his news of victory, Akbar wrote: "With the help of our blood-thirsty sword we have erased the signs of infidelity in their minds and destroyed the temples in those places and all over Hindustan."

Akbar had the surviving defenders and 30,000 non-combatants massacred and their heads displayed upon towers erected throughout the region to demonstrate his authority. Thereafter, Udai Singh never ventured out of his mountain refuge in Mewar.

A legend, oft repeated by historians, has grown up that Akbar set up statues of Jaimal and Patta mounted on elephants at a gate of his fort in Agra to commemorate his victory. There are records from his time of two statues of elephants with their riders outside the eastern gate of his fort in Agra, but these may have had nothing to do with the Rajputs of Chittor, they may have been purely decorative. Indologist Eugenia Vanina found no account that connects the statues to Jaimal and Patta until a 1629 chronicle by Dutch merchants. She believes that the narrative that the statues were monuments grew up to "provide ideological, social and psychological substantiation" of the alliance between the Mughals and the Rajputs.

The fall of Chittorgarh was followed up by a Mughal attack on the Ranthambore Fort in 1568. Ranthambore was held by the Hada Rajputs and reputed to be the most powerful fortress in India. However, it fell only after a couple of months. At that point, most of the Rajput kings had submitted to the Mughals; only the clans of Mewar continued to resist. Udai Singh's son and successor, Maharana Pratap, was later defeated by the Mughals at the Battle of Haldighati in 1576. Akbar would celebrate his conquest of Rajputana by laying the foundation of a new capital, 23 miles (37 km) west-southwest of Agra, in 1569. It was called Fatehpur Sikri, or the "City of Victory". Pratap Singh continued to attack the Mughals and was able to retain most of his remaining kingdom during Akbar's reign.

=== Western and Eastern India ===
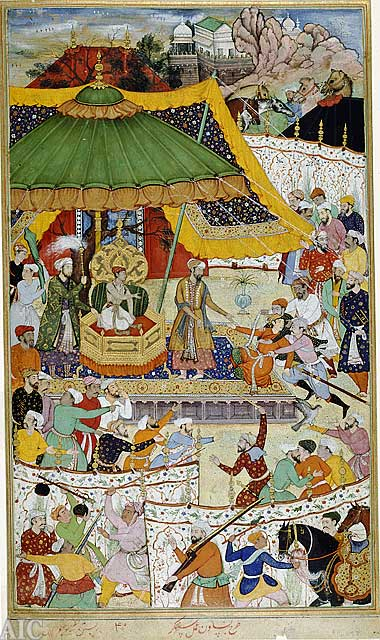
The court of young Akbar, aged 13, showing his first imperial act: the arrest of an unruly courtier, who was once a favourite of Akbar's father. Illustration from a manuscript of the Akbarnama.

Akbar's next military objectives were the conquest of Gujarat and Bengal, which connected India with the trading centres of Asia, Africa, and Europe through the Arabian Sea and the Bay of Bengal. Gujarat had also been a haven for rebellious Mughal nobles. In Bengal, the Afghans still held considerable influence under their ruler, Sulaiman Khan Karrani. Akbar first moved against Gujarat, which lay in the crook of the Mughal provinces of Rajputana and Malwa. Gujarat possessed areas of rich agricultural production in its central plain, an impressive output of textiles and other industrial goods, and the busiest seaports of India. Akbar intended to link the maritime state with the massive resources of the Indo-Gangetic plains.

Akbar's ostensible casus belli for warring with Gujarat was that the rebel Mirzas, who had previously been driven out of India, were now operating out of a base in southern Gujarat. Moreover, Akbar had received invitations from cliques in Gujarat to oust the reigning king, which further served as justification for his military expedition. In 1572, Akbar moved to occupy Ahmedabad, the capital, and other northern cities, and was proclaimed the lawful sovereign of Gujarat. By 1573, he had driven out the Mirzas who, after offering token resistance, fled for refuge in the Deccan. Surat, the commercial capital of the region, and other coastal cities soon capitulated to the Mughals. The king, Muzaffar Shah III, was caught hiding in a corn field; he was pensioned off by Akbar with a small allowance.

Akbar then returned to Fatehpur Sikiri, where he built the Buland Darwaza to commemorate his victories. But, a rebellion by Afghan nobles supported by the Rajput ruler of Idar, as well a resurgence of the Mirzas (who retook Cambay, Broach, and Surat), forced his return to Gujarat. Akbar crossed Rajputana and reached Ahmedabad in 11 days—a journey that normally took six weeks. The outnumbered Mughal army won a decisive victory on 2 September 1573. Akbar slew the rebel leaders and erected a tower out of their severed heads. The conquest and subjugation of Gujarat proved highly profitable for the Mughals; after expenses, the territory yielded a revenue of more than five million rupees annually to Akbar's treasury.

After conquering Gujarat, the remaining centre of Afghan power was Bengal. In 1572, Sulaiman Khan's son, Daud Khan, succeeded him. Daud Khan defined Mughal rule, assuming the insignia of royalty and ordering that the khutbah be proclaimed in his name, rather than Akbar's. Munim Khan, the Mughal governor of Bihar, was ordered to chastise Daud Khan. Eventually, Akbar himself set out to Bengal, and in 1574, the Mughals seized Patna from Daud Khan, who fled to Bengal. Akbar then returned to Fatehpur Sikri and left his generals to finish the campaign. The Mughal army was subsequently victorious at the Battle of Tukaroi in 1575, which led to the annexation of Bengal and parts of Bihar that had been under the dominion of Daud Khan. Only Orissa was left in the hands of the Karrani dynasty, albeit as a fief of the Mughal Empire. A year later, however, Daud Khan rebelled and attempted to regain Bengal. He was defeated by the Mughal general Khan Jahan Quli and fled into exile. Daud Khan was later captured and executed by Mughal forces. His severed head was sent to Akbar, while his limbs were gibbeted at Tandah, the Mughal capital in Bengal.

=== Afghanistan and Central Asia ===
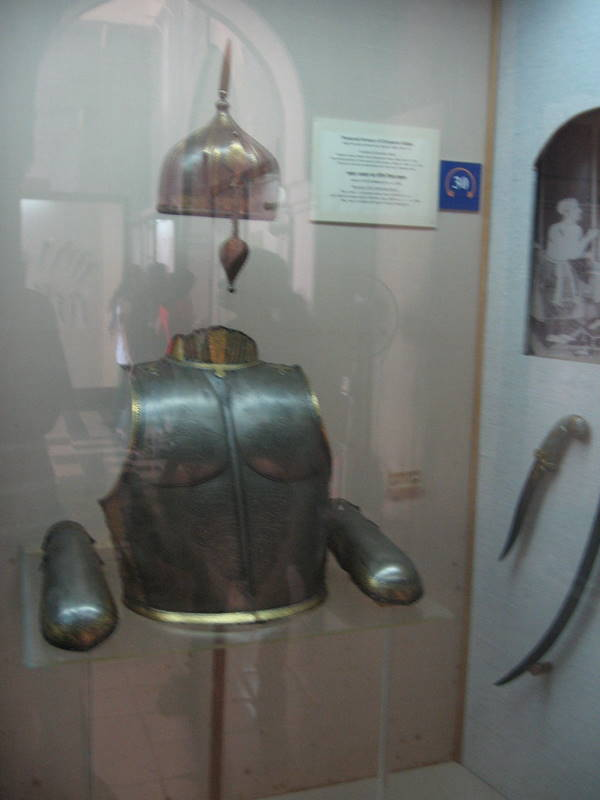
Plate and helmet of the personal armour of Akbar

Following his conquests of Gujarat and Bengal, Akbar was preoccupied with domestic concerns. He did not leave Fatehpur Sikri on a military campaign until 1581, when Punjab was again invaded by his brother, Mirza Muhammad Hakim. Akbar expelled his brother to Kabul and waged a campaign to remove him from power. At the same time, Akbar's nobles were resisting leaving India to administer the Empire's holdings in Afghanistan; they were, according to Abul Fazl "afraid of the cold of Afghanistan". Likewise, Hindu officers in the Mughal army were inhibited by the traditional taboo against crossing the Indus. To encourage them, Akbar provided them with pay eight months in advance.

In August 1581, Akbar seized Kabul and took up residence at Babur's old citadel. He stayed there for three weeks and his brother fled into the mountains. Akbar left Kabul in the hands of his sister, Bakht-un-Nissa Begum, and returned to India. He then pardoned his brother, who took up de facto control of the Mughal administration in Kabul; Bakht-un-Nissa continued to be the official governor. In 1585, after Muhammad Hakim died, Kabul passed into the hands of Akbar and was officially incorporated as a province of the Mughal Empire.

The Kabul expedition was the beginning of a long period of activity over the northern frontiers of the empire. For thirteen years, beginning in 1585, Akbar remained in the north, shifting his capital to Lahore while he dealt with challenges from Uzbek tribes, which had driven his grandfather, Babur, out of Central Asia. The Uzbeks were organised under Abdullah Khan Shaybanid, a military chieftain who had seized Badakhshan and Balkh from Akbar's distant Timurid relatives, and whose troops challenged the northwestern frontiers of the Mughal Empire. The Uzbeks also subsidised Afghan tribes on the border that were hostile to the Mughals. The tribes felt challenged by the Yusufzai of Bajaur and Swat and were motivated by a new religious leader, Bayazid, the founder of the Roshaniyya sect.

In 1586, Akbar negotiated a pact with Abdullah Khan in which the Mughals agreed to remain neutral during the Uzbek invasion of Safavid-held Khorasan. In return, Abdullah Khan agreed to refrain from supporting, subsidising, or offering refuge to the Afghan tribes hostile to the Mughals. Akbar, in turn, began a series of campaigns to pacify the Yusufzais and other rebels. Akbar ordered Zain Khan to lead an expedition against the Afghan tribes. Raja Birbal, a renowned minister in Akbar's court, was also given military command. The expedition failed, and on their retreat from the mountains, Birbal and his entourage were ambushed and killed by Afghans at the Malandarai Pass in February 1586. Akbar immediately fielded new armies to reinvade the Yusufzai lands under the command of Raja Todar Mal. Over the next six years, the Mughals contained the Yusufzai in the mountain valleys, forcing the submission of many chiefs in Swat and Bajaur. Dozens of forts were built and occupied to secure the region.

Despite his pact with the Uzbeks, Akbar nurtured a secret hope of reconquering Central Asia, but Badakshan and Balkh remained firmly part of the Uzbek dominion. Abdullah Khan died in 1598 and the last of the rebellious Afghan tribes were subdued by 1600. The Roshaniyya movement was suppressed, its leaders were captured or driven into exile, and the Afridi and Orakzai tribes which had risen up under them were subjugated. Jalaluddin, the son of the Roshaniyya movement's founder, Bayazid, was killed in 1601 in a fight with Mughal troops near Ghazni.

=== Indus Valley ===
==== Kashmir ====
While Akbar was in Lahore dealing with the Uzbeks, he sought to subjugate the Indus valley to secure the frontier provinces. In 1585, he sent an army to conquer Kashmir in the upper Indus basin after Yousuf Shah, the reigning king of the Shia Chak dynasty, refused to send his son as a hostage to the Mughal court. Yousuf Shah surrendered immediately to the Mughals, but another of his sons, Yaqub Shah, crowned himself as king, leading a resistance against the Mughal armies. In June 1589, Akbar travelled from Lahore to Srinagar to receive the surrender of Yaqub and his rebel forces. Baltistan and Ladakh, which were Tibetan provinces adjacent to Kashmir, pledged their allegiance to Akbar. The Mughals also moved to conquer Sindh in the lower Indus valley.

==== Sindh ====
Since 1574, the northern fortress of Bhakkar had remained under imperial control. In 1586, the Mughal governor of Multan tried and failed to secure the capitulation of Mirza Jani Beg, the independent ruler of Thatta in southern Sindh. Akbar responded by sending a Mughal army to besiege Sehwan, the river capital of the region. Jani Beg mustered a large army to meet the Mughals. Despite being outnumbered, the Mughal forces defeated the Sindhi forces at the Battle of Sehwan. After suffering further defeats, Jani Beg surrendered to the Mughals in 1591, and in 1593, paid homage to Akbar in Lahore.

==== Baluchistan ====
As early as 1586, about half a dozen Baluchi chiefs, under nominal Pani Afghan rule, had been persuaded to subordinate themselves to Akbar. In preparation for taking Kandahar from the Safavids, Akbar ordered the Mughal forces to conquer the rest of the Afghan-held parts of Baluchistan in 1595. The Mughal general Mir Masum led an attack on the stronghold of Sibi, which was northeast of Quetta, and defeated a coalition of local chieftains in battle. They were required to acknowledge Mughal supremacy and attend Akbar's court. As a result, the modern-day Pakistani and Afghan parts of Baluchistan, including the Makran coast, became a part of the Mughal Empire.

=== Safavids and Kandahar ===
Kandahar (also known as the ancient Indian kingdom of Gandhara) had connections with the Mughals from the time of the Empire's ancestor, Timur, the warlord who had conquered much of Western, Central, and parts of South Asia in the 14th century. However, the Safavids considered it to be an appanage of the Persian-ruled territory of Khorasan, and declared its association with the Mughal emperors to be a usurpation. In 1558, while Akbar was consolidating his rule over northern India, Safavid Shah Tahmasp I seized Kandahar and expelled its Mughal governor. The recovery of Kandahar had not been a priority for Akbar, but after his military activity in the northern frontiers, he moved to restore Mughal control. At the time, the region was also under threat from the Uzbeks, but the Emperor of Persia, himself beleaguered by the Ottoman Turks, was unable to send reinforcements.

In 1593, Akbar received the exiled Safavid prince, Rostam Mirza. Rostam Mirza pledged allegiance to the Mughals; he was granted a rank (mansab) of command over 5,000 men and received Multan as a jagir. The Safavid prince and governor of Kandahar, Mozaffar Hosayn, also agreed to defect to the Mughals. Hosayn, who was in an adversary relationship with his overlord, Shah Abbas, was granted a rank of 5,000 men, and his daughter Kandahari Begum was married to Akbar's grandson, the Mughal prince Khurram. Kandahar was secured in 1595 with the arrival of a garrison headed by the Mughal general, Shah Bayg Khan. The reconquest of Kandahar did not overtly disturb Mughal-Persian relations. Akbar and the Persian Shah continued to exchange ambassadors and presents. However, the power equation between the two had now changed in favour of the Mughals.

=== Deccan Sultans ===
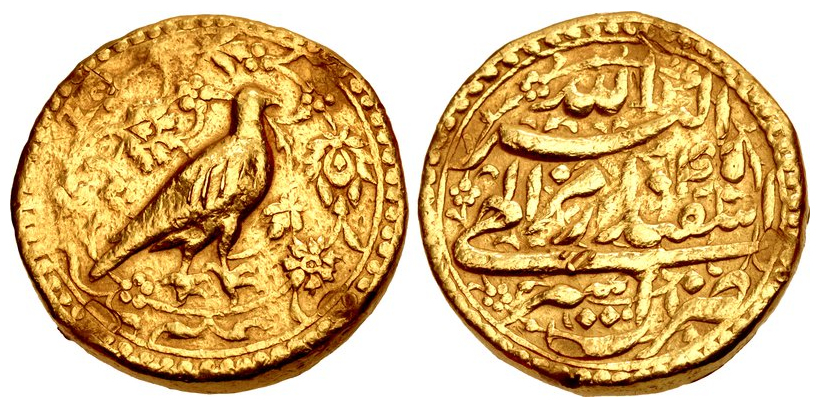
Falcon Mohur of Akbar, minted in Asir, issued in the name of Akbar to commemorate the capture of Asirgarh Fort of the on 17 January 1601. Legend: "Allah is great, Khordad Ilahi 45, struck at Asir."

In 1593, Akbar began military operations against the Deccan Sultans, who had not submitted to his authority. He besieged Ahmednagar Fort in 1595, forcing Chand Bibi to cede Berar. A subsequent revolt forced Akbar to take the fort in August 1600. Akbar occupied Burhanpur and besieged Asirgarh Fort in 1599, and took it on 17 January 1601, when Miran Bahadur Shah of the Khandesh Sultanate refused to relinquish Khandesh. Akbar then established the Subahs of Ahmadnagar, Berar, and Khandesh under Prince Daniyal. "By the time of his death in 1605, Akbar controlled a broad sweep of territory from the Bay of Bengal to Kandahar and Badakshan. He touched the western sea in Sind and at Surat and was well astride central India."

== Administration ==
=== Political structure ===
Akbar's system of central government was based on the system that had evolved since the Delhi Sultanate. Akbar reorganised the sections with a detailed set of regulations. The revenue department was headed by a wazir, responsible for finances and management of jagir and inam land. The head of the military was called the mir bakshi, appointed from among the leading nobles of the court. The mir bakshi was in charge of intelligence gathering, and made recommendations to the emperor for military appointments and promotion. The mir saman was in charge of the imperial household, including the harems, and supervised the functioning of the court and royal bodyguard. The judiciary was a separate organisation headed by a chief qazi, who was also responsible for religious beliefs and practices.

=== Taxation ===
Akbar reformed the administration land revenues by adopting a system that had been used by Sher Shah Suri. The village continued to remain the primary unit of revenue assessment. Cultivated areas were measured and taxed through fixed rates—on the basis of prices prevailing the imperial court—based on the type of crop and productivity. This system burdened the peasantry because prices at the imperial court were often higher than those in the countryside. Akbar also introduced a decentralised system of annual assessment, which resulted in corruption among local officials. The system was abandoned in 1580 and replaced with the dahsala (also known as zabti), under which revenue was calculated as one-third of the average produce of the previous ten years, to be paid to the state in cash. This system was later refined, taking into account local prices and grouping areas with similar productivity into assessment circles. Remission was given to peasants when the harvest failed during times of flood or drought. The dahsala system was set out by Raja Todar Mal, who also served as a revenue officer under Sher Shah Suri, in a detailed memorandum submitted to the emperor in 1582–1583. Other local methods of assessment continued in some areas. Lands which were fallow or uncultivated were assessed at concessional rates.

Akbar also encouraged the improvement and extension of agriculture. Zamindars were required to provide loans and agricultural implements in times of need, and to encourage farmers to plough as much land as possible and sow high-quality seeds. In turn, the zamindars were given a hereditary right to collect a share of the produce. Peasants had a hereditary right to cultivate the land as long as they paid the land revenue. Revenue officials were guaranteed only three-quarters of their salary, with the remaining quarter dependent on their full realisation of the revenue assessed.

=== Military organisation ===
Akbar organised his army and the nobility by means of a system called the mansabdari. Under this system, each officer in the army was assigned a rank (a mansabdar) and assigned a number of cavalry, which he was required to supply to the imperial army. The mansabdars were divided into 33 classes. The top three commanding ranks, ranging from 7,000 to 10,000 troops, were normally reserved for princes. Ranks between 10 and 5,000 were assigned to other members of the nobility. The empire's permanent standing army was small and the imperial forces mostly consisted of contingents maintained by the mansabdars. Persons were normally appointed to a low mansab and then promoted based on merit and the favour of the emperor. Each mansabdar was required to maintain a certain number of cavalrymen and twice that number of horses. The number of horses was greater because they had to be rested and rapidly replaced in times of war. Akbar employed strict measures to ensure that the quality of the armed forces was maintained at a high level; horses were regularly inspected and usually only Arabian horses were employed. The mansabdars were the highest paid military service in the world at the time.

=== Capitals ===
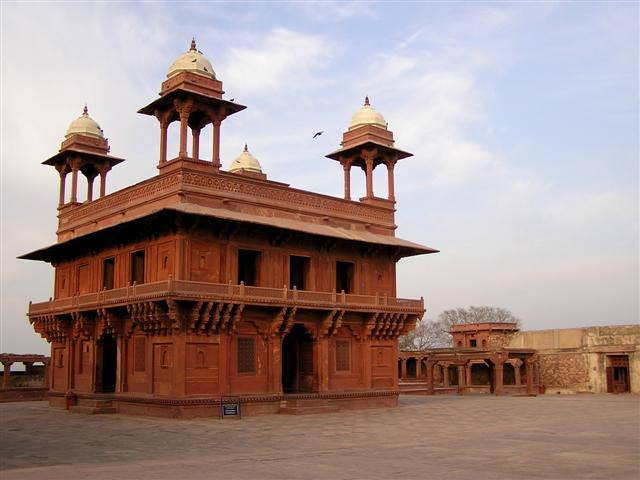
Diwan-i-Khas (Hall of Private Audience) in Fatehpur Sikri

Akbar was a follower of Salim Chishti, a holy man who lived in the region of Sikri near Agra. Believing the area to be lucky, Akbar had a mosque constructed there for the use of the priest. Subsequently, he celebrated the victories over Chittor and Ranthambore by laying the foundations of a new walled capital, 23 miles (37 km) west of Agra in 1569, which was named Fatehpur ("Town of Victory") after the conquest of Gujarat in 1573, and subsequently came to be known as Fatehpur Sikri to distinguish it from other similarly named towns. The city was soon abandoned and the capital was moved to Lahore in 1585. Historians have advanced several reasons for the move, including an insufficient or poor quality water supply at Fatehpur Sikri, Akbar's campaigns in the northwest areas of the Empire or loss of interest. In 1599, Akbar moved his capital back to Agra, where he ruled until his death.

=== Culture ===
Akbar was a patron of the arts and culture. He had Sanskrit literature translated and participated in native festivals. Akbar established the library of Fatehpur Sikri exclusively for women, and he decreed the establishment of schools for the education of both Muslims and Hindus throughout the realm. He also encouraged bookbinding to become a high art.

== Economy ==
=== Trade ===
Akbar's government prioritised commercial expansion, encouraging traders, providing protection and security for transactions, and levying a low custom duty to stimulate foreign trade. It also required that local administrators provide restitution to traders for goods stolen while in their territories. To minimise such incidents, bands of highway police called rahdars were enlisted to patrol roads and ensure the safety of traders. Other active measures taken included the construction and protection of routes of commerce and communications. Akbar made concerted efforts to improve roads to facilitate the use of wheeled vehicles through the Khyber Pass, the most popular route frequented by traders and travellers journeying from Kabul into Mughal India. He also strategically occupied the northwestern cities of Multan and Lahore in Punjab and constructed forts, such as the one at Attock near the crossing of the Grand Trunk Road and the Indus river. He also constructed a network of smaller forts called thanas throughout the frontier to secure the overland trade route with Persia and Central Asia. He also established an international trading business for his chief consort, Mariam-uz-Zamani, who ran an extensive trade of indigo, spices, and cotton to Gulf nations through merchant's vessels.

=== Coins ===
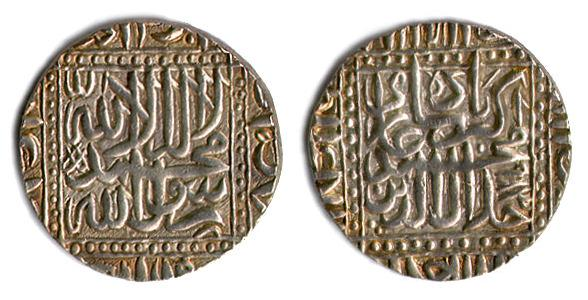
An ornamental silver Rupee of Akbar with inscriptions of the Islamic declaration of faith; the declaration reads: There is no god except Allah, and Muhammad is the messenger of Allah.

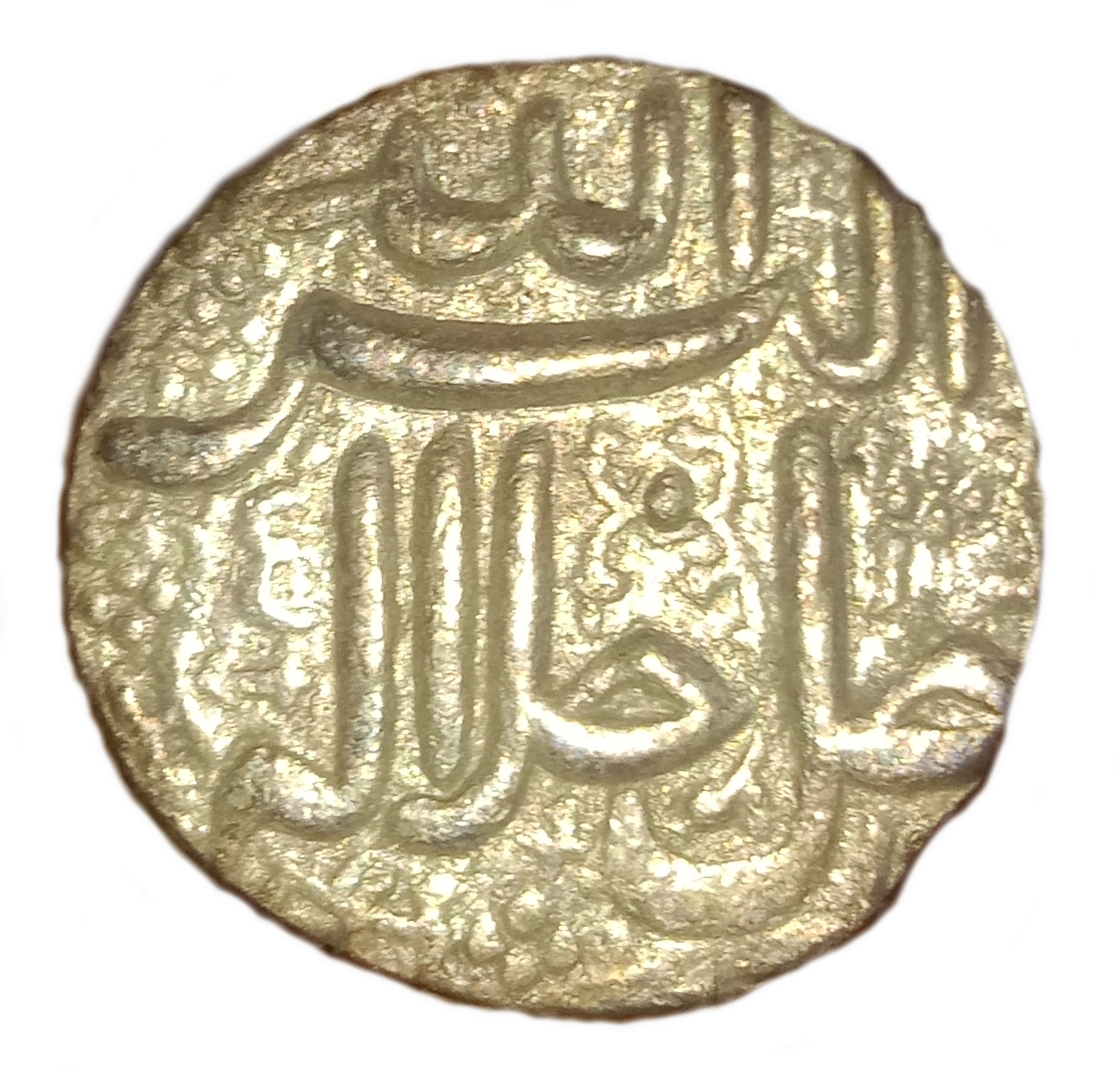
Silver Rupee struck in the name of Mughal emperor Jalaluddin Muhammad Akbar, minted in Ahmadabad, Ilahi type coin with having the regnal year 47.

Akbar introduced coins with decorative features, including floral motifs, dotted borders, and quatrefoil. The coins were issued in both round and square shapes, including a unique 'mehrab' (lozenge) shaped coin. Akbar's portrait type gold coin (Mohur) is generally attributed to his son, Prince Salim (later Emperor Jahangir), who had rebelled and then sought reconciliation by minting and presenting his father with gold Mohurs bearing Akbar's portrait. During the latter part of Akbar's reign, coins portrayed the concept of Akbar's newly promoted religion, with the Ilahi type and Jalla Jalal-Hu types.

== Diplomacy ==
=== Matrimonial alliances ===
Prior to Akbar's reign, marriages between Hindu princesses and Muslim kings failed to produce stable relations between the families involved; the women were lost to their families and did not return after marriage. Akbar departed from that practice, providing that the Hindu Rajputs who married their daughters or sisters to him would be treated equally to his Muslim fathers- and brothers-in-law, except that they would not be allowed to dine or pray with him or take Muslim wives. Akbar also made those Rajputs members of his court. Some Rajputs considered marriage to Akbar a sign of humiliation.

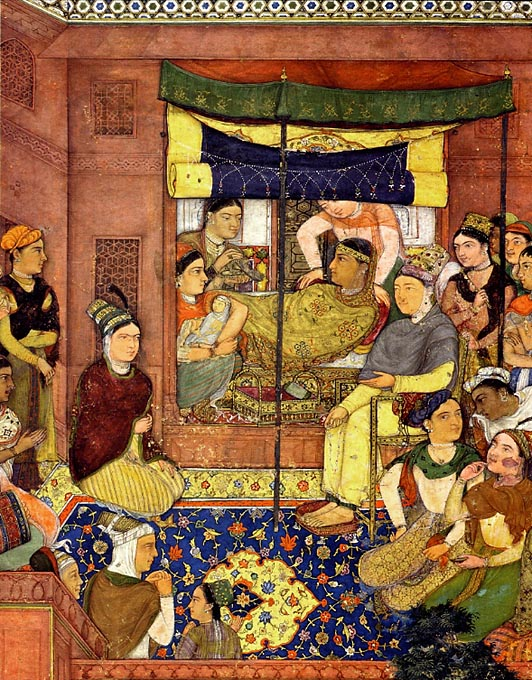
Portrait of Empress Mariam-uz-Zamani, commonly known as Jodha Bai, giving birth to Prince Salim, the future emperor Jahangir.

The Kacchwaha Rajput, Raja Bharmal, of the small kingdom of Amer, and an early member of Akbar's court, allied with Akbar by giving his daughter, Mariam-uz-Zamani—who would go on to be Akbar's favorite wife—in marriage to Akbar. Bharmal was made a noble of high rank in the imperial court, and subsequently, his son Bhagwant Das and grandson Man Singh also rose to high ranks in the nobility.

Other Rajput kingdoms also established matrimonial alliances with Akbar, but Akbar did not insist upon matrimony as a precondition for forming alliances. When Akbar met with the Hada leader, Surjan Hada, to effect an alliance, Surjan accepted on the condition that Akbar could not marry any of his daughters. Consequently, no matrimonial alliance was entered into, but Surjan was made a noble and placed in charge of Garh-Katanga. Two major Rajput clans remained aloof—the Sisodiyas of Mewar and Hadas of Ranthambore.

The political effect of these alliances was significant. While some Rajput women who entered Akbar's harem converted to Islam, they were generally provided full religious freedom; their relatives, who continued to remain Hindu, formed a significant part of the nobility and served to articulate the opinions of the majority of commoners in the imperial court. The interaction between Hindu and Muslim nobles in the imperial court resulted in an exchange of thoughts and a blending of the two cultures. Newer generations of the Mughal line also represented a merger of Mughal and Rajput blood, thereby strengthening ties between the two. As a result, the Rajputs became the strongest allies of the Mughals, and Rajput soldiers and generals fought for the Mughal army under Akbar, leading it in several campaigns, including the conquest of Gujarat in 1572. Akbar's policy of religious tolerance ensured that employment in the imperial administration was open to all on merit, irrespective of creed, strengthening his imperial rule.

Akbar's daughter Meherunnissa was rumoured to be enamored of Tansen and might have played a role in his coming to Akbar's court. Tansen converted to Islam from Hinduism, apparently on the eve of his marriage with Akbar's daughter.

== Foreign relations ==
=== Relations with the Portuguese ===
A monarch should be ever intent on conquest, otherwise his neighbours rise in arms against him.

— Akbar, quoted in Abu'l Fazl (c. 1590). Ain-i-Akbari. Translated by Jarrett.

At the time of Akbar's ascension in 1556, the Portuguese had established several fortresses and factories on the western coast of the subcontinent, and largely controlled navigation and sea trade in that region. As a consequence, all other trading entities were subject to the terms and conditions of the Portuguese, which was resented by rulers and traders, including Bahadur Shah of Gujarat.

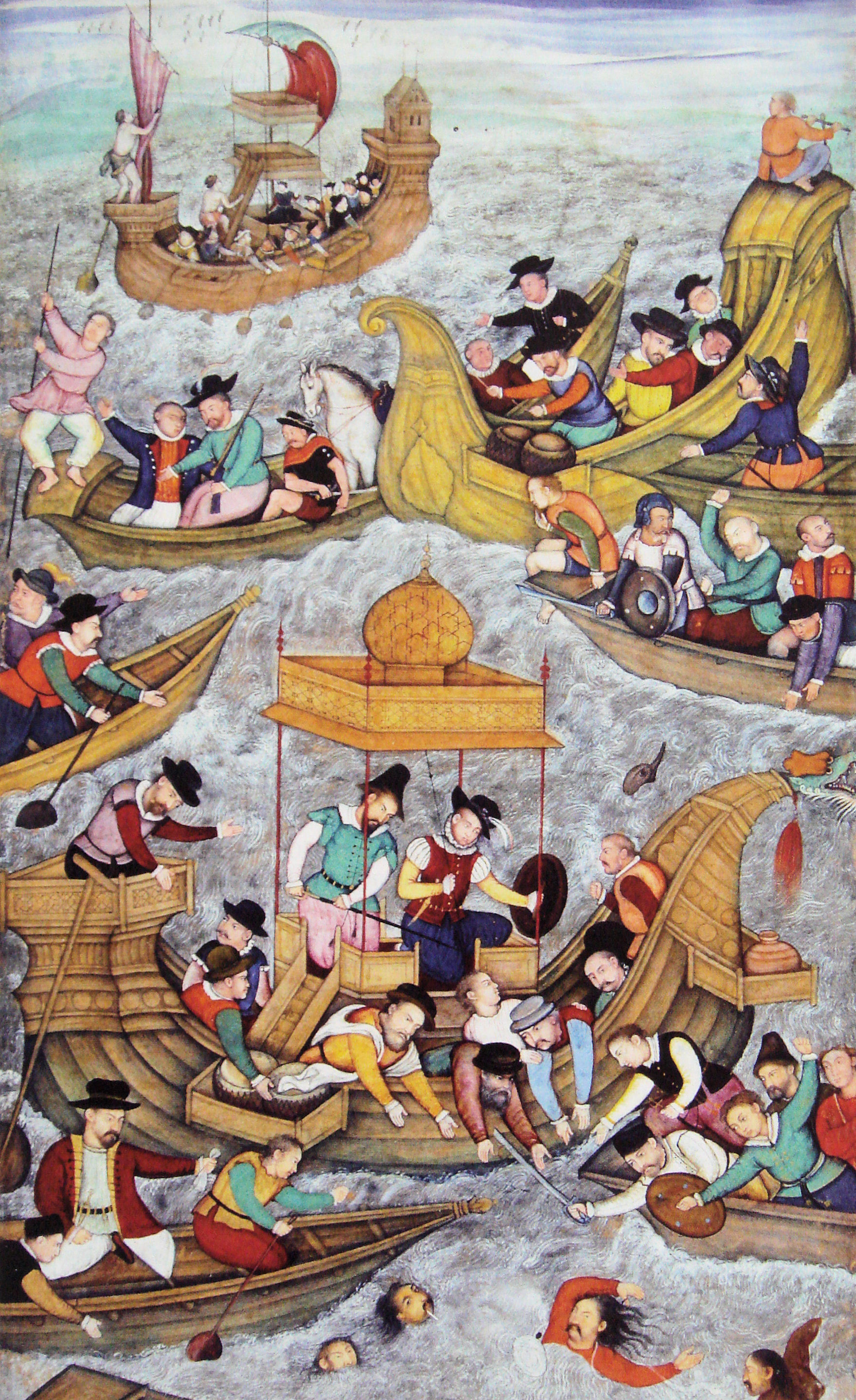
Death of Bahadur Shah of Gujarat at Diu, in front of the Portuguese in 1537

In 1572, the Mughal Empire annexed Gujarat and acquired its first access to the sea, but local officials informed Akbar that the Portuguese had begun to exert control in the Indian Ocean. Akbar obtained a cartaz (permit) from the Portuguese to sail in the Persian Gulf region. At the initial meeting of the Mughals and the Portuguese during the Siege of Surat in 1572, the Portuguese, recognising the superior strength of the Mughal army, chose to adopt diplomacy instead of war. The Portuguese Governor, upon the request of Akbar, sent him an ambassador to establish friendly relations.

Akbar accepted the offer of diplomacy, but the Portuguese continually asserted their authority and power in the Indian Ocean; Akbar expressed concern when he was required to request a permit from the Portuguese before any ships from the Mughal Empire could depart for the Hajj to Mecca and Medina. In 1573, Akbar issued a firman directing Mughal administrative officials in Gujarat not to provoke the Portuguese in the territory they held in Daman. The Portuguese, in turn, issued passes for members of Akbar's family to go on Hajj to Mecca. The Portuguese made mention of the extraordinary status of the vessel and the special status to be accorded to its occupants.

Akbar was unsuccessful in purchasing compact artillery pieces from the Portuguese, hindering his efforts to establish a Mughal navy along the Gujarat coast.

In September 1579, Jesuits from Goa were invited to visit the court of Akbar. The emperor had his scribes translate the New Testament and granted the Jesuits freedom to preach the Gospel. One of his sons, Sultan Murad Mirza, was entrusted to Antoni de Montserrat for his education. While debating at court, the Jesuits denigrated Islam and Muhammad. Their comments enraged the Imams and Ulama, who objected to the remarks, but Akbar ordered their comments to be recorded. This event was followed by a rebellion of Muslim clerics in 1581 led by Mullah Muhammad Yazdi and Muiz-ul-Mulk, the chief Qadi of Bengal; the rebels sought to overthrow Akbar and put his brother Mirza Muhammad Hakim on the Mughal throne. Akbar successfully defeated the rebels, but he became more cautious about inviting guests to his court, seeking advice from his counselors.

=== Relations with the Ottoman Empire ===
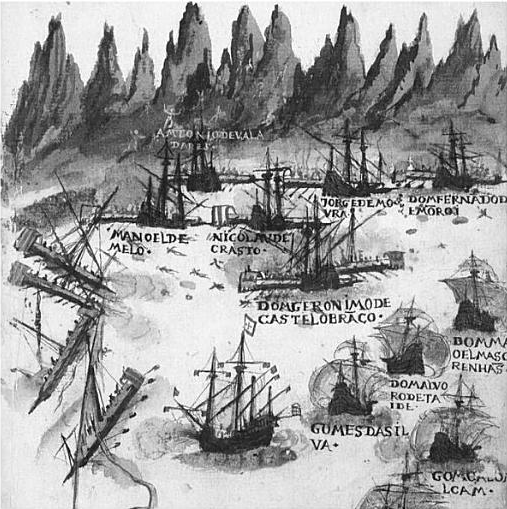
Portuguese ambush against the galleys of Seydi Ali Reis (Akbar's allies) in the Indian Ocean

In 1555, while Akbar was still a child, the Ottoman Admiral Seydi Ali Reis visited the Mughal Emperor Humayun. In 1569, during the early years of Akbar's rule, Ottoman Admiral Kurtoğlu Hızır Reis visited the Empire. These Ottoman admirals sought to end the growing threats of the Portuguese Empire during their Indian Ocean campaigns. During his reign, Akbar six documents addressing the Ottoman Sultan Suleiman the Magnificent.

In 1576, Akbar sent a contingent of pilgrims on Hajj, led by Khwaja Sultan Naqshbandi, with 600,000 rupees and 12,000 khalats (honorific robes) for the needy of Mecca and Medina. In October 1576, Akbar sent a delegation, which included his aunt Gulbadan Begum and his consort Salima, on Hajj by two ships, including an Ottoman vessel, from Surat, which reached the port of Jeddah in 1577 and then proceeded to Mecca and Medina. Four more caravans were sent from 1577 to 1580, with gifts for the authorities of Mecca and Medina.

During this period, Akbar financed the pilgrimages of many poor Muslims from the Mughal Empire and also funded the foundations of the Qadiriyya Sufi Order's dervish lodge in the Hijaz. Akbar's attempts to build Mughal presence in Mecca and Medina reassured the local Sharifs of the Mughal Empire's ability to provide financial support, lessening their dependency upon Ottoman bounties. Mughal-Ottoman trade also flourished during this period; merchants loyal to Akbar are known to have reached Aleppo after journeying upriver through the port of Basra.

The imperial Mughal entourage stayed in Mecca and Medina for nearly four years and attended the Hajj four times. In 1582, the Ottoman authorities forced them to return to India. Historian Naimur Rahman Farooqi has suggested that their expulsion may explain why Akbar broke relations with the Hijaz and stopped sending Hajj caravans after 1581.

According to some accounts, Akbar expressed a desire to form an alliance with the Portuguese against the Ottomans, but nothing came of the idea.

=== Relations with the Safavid dynasty ===
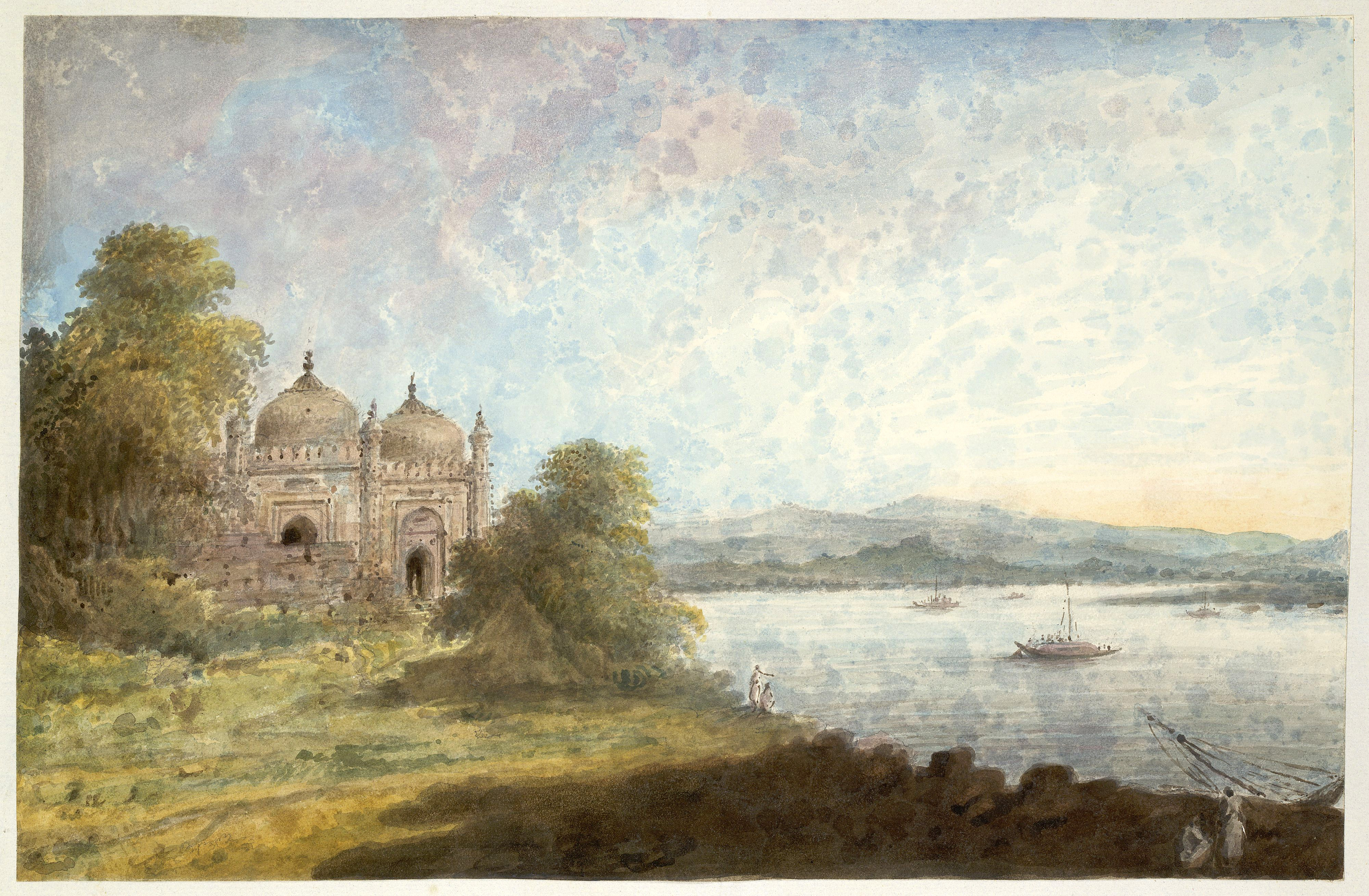
The Akbari Mosque, overlooking the Ganges

Before Akbar's rule, the Safavids and the Mughals had a long history of diplomatic relations. The Safavid ruler Tahmasp I provided refuge to Humayun when he was forced to flee the Indian subcontinent following his defeat by Sher Shah Suri. However, the Safavids differed from the Sunni Mughals in following the Shia branch of Islam.

One of the longest-standing disputes between the Safavids and the Mughals pertained to control of the city of Kandahar in the Hindu Kush region, which formed the border between the two empires. Military strategists of the time considered the region to be militarily significant due to its geography. The city, which was administered by Bairam Khan at the time of Akbar's accession, was invaded and captured by the Persian ruler Soltan Hosayn Mirza, a cousin of Tahmasp I, in 1558. Shortly afterwards, Akbar's army completed its annexation of Kabul, and to further secure the north-western boundaries of his empire, it proceeded to Kandahar. The city capitulated without resistance on 18 April 1595, and the ruler Mozaffar-Hosayn Mirza joined Akbar's court. Subsequent to this, Bairam Khan sent an envoy to the court of Tahmasp I in an effort to maintain peaceful relations with the Safavids. This gesture was reciprocated and a cordial relationship prevailed between the two empires during the remainder of the first two decades of Akbar's reign. The death of Tahmasp I in 1576 resulted in civil war and instability in the Safavid empire, and diplomatic relations between the two empires ceased for more than a decade. They were restored only in 1587 following the accession of Shah Abbas to the Safavid throne. Diplomatic relations continued to be maintained between the Safavid and Mughal courts until the end of Akbar's reign. Kandahar remained in Mughal possession, and the Hindu Kush was the empire's western frontier for several decades until Shah Jahan's expedition into Badakhshan in 1646.

=== Relations with other contemporary kingdoms ===
Vincent Arthur Smith has observed that the merchant Mildenhall was employed in 1600 to bear a letter from Queen Elizabeth to Akbar requesting liberty to trade in his dominions on terms as good as those enjoyed by the Portuguese.

Akbar was also visited by the French explorer Pierre Malherbe.

== Religious policy ==
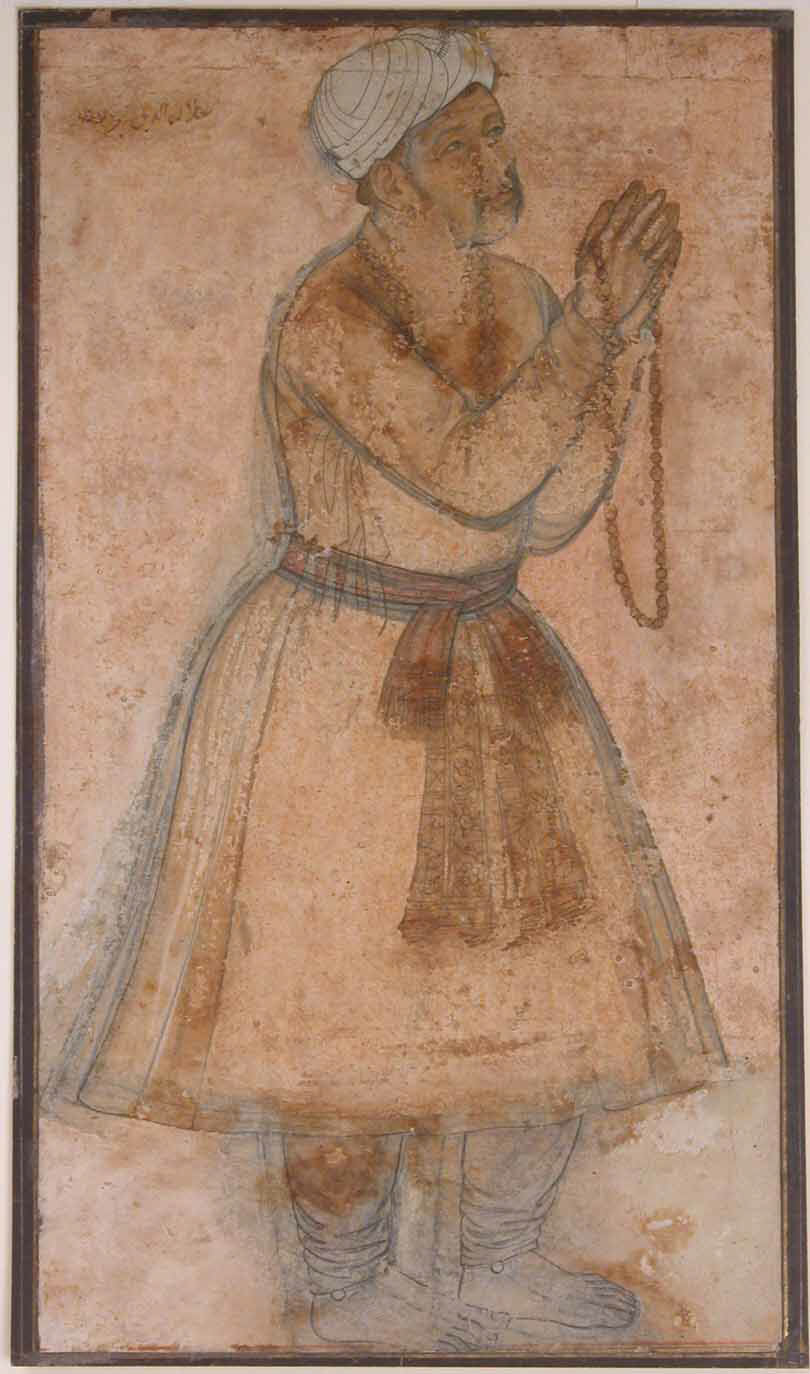
Portrait of the Mughal Emperor Akbar invocation of a Dua prayer

Akbar and other members of his family, are believed to have been Sunni Hanafi Muslims. except his mother who was a Persian Shia His early days were spent in the backdrop of an atmosphere in which liberal sentiments were encouraged and religious narrow-mindedness was frowned upon. From the 15th century, a number of rulers in various parts of the country adopted a more liberal policy of religious tolerance, attempting to foster communal harmony between Hindus and Muslims. These sentiments were earlier encouraged by the teachings of popular saints like Guru Nanak, Kabir, and Chaitanya, and the verses of the Persian poet Hafez, which advocated human sympathy and a liberal outlook. The Timurid ethos of religious tolerance persisted from the times of Timur to Humayun, and influenced Akbar's policy of tolerance in matters of religion. Akbar's childhood tutors, including two Irani Shias, were largely above sectarian prejudices, and made a significant contribution to Akbar's later inclination towards religious tolerance.

Akbar sponsored religious debates between different Muslim groups (Sunni, Shia, Ismaili, and Sufis), Parsis, Hindus (Shaivite and Vaishnava), Sikhs, Jains, Jews, Jesuits, and Materialists. He was also partial to Sufism; he proclaimed that "the wisdom of Vedanta is the wisdom of Sufism".

=== Association with the Muslim aristocracy ===
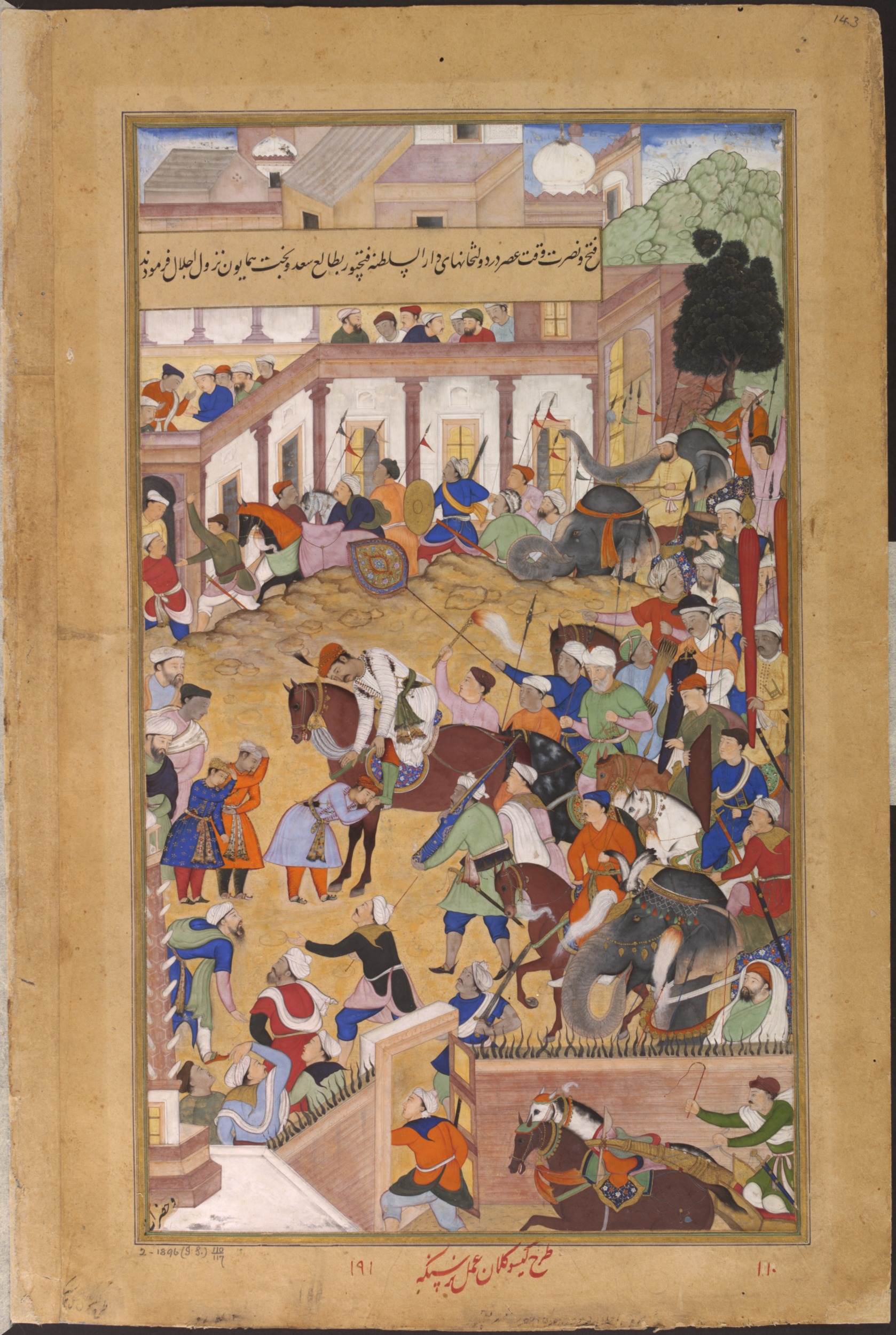
The Mughal Emperor Akbar welcomes his son Prince Salim at Fatehpur Sikri (Akbarnameh).

During the early part of his reign, Akbar adopted an attitude of suppression towards Muslim sects that were condemned by the orthodoxy as heretical. In 1567, on the advice of Shaikh Abdu'n Nabi, he ordered the exhumation of Mir Murtaza Sharifi Shirazi – a Shia buried in Delhi – because of the grave's proximity to that of Amir Khusrau, arguing that a "heretic" could not be buried so close to the grave of a Sunni saint. This reflected a restrictive attitude towards the Shia, which continued to persist until the early 1570s. He suppressed Mahdavism in 1573 during his campaign in Gujarat, in the course of which the Mahdavi leader Bandagi Miyan Sheik Mustafa was arrested and brought in chains to the court for debate and released after eighteen months.

Akbar was reportedly angered by acts of embezzlement by many high level Muslim clerics. As Akbar increasingly came under the influence of pantheistic Sufi mysticism from the early 1570s, his outlook shifted from orthodox Islam as traditionally professed, to a new concept of Islam that transcended the limits of Islam. During the latter half of his reign, he adopted a policy of tolerance towards the Shias and declared a prohibition on Shia-Sunni conflict, and the empire remained neutral in matters of internal sectarian conflict. In 1579, the Mughal Emperor Akbar referred to himself as:

Emperor of Islam, Emir of the Faithful, Shadow of God on earth, Abul Fath Jalal-ud-din Muhammad Akbar Badshah Ghazi (whose empire Allah perpetuate), is a most just, most wise, and a most God-fearing ruler.

To strengthen his position in dealing with the ulema (Muslim legal scholars), Akbar issued a mazhar, or declaration, that was signed by all major ulemas in 1579. The mahzar asserted that Akbar was the Khalifa of the age, a higher rank than that of a Mujtahid; in case of a difference of opinion among the Mujtahids, Akbar could select any one opinion and could also issue decrees that did not go against the nass. Given the prevailing Islamic sectarian conflicts in various parts of the country at that time, it is believed that the mazhar helped stabilise the religious situation in the empire. It also helped him eliminate the religious and political influence of the Ottoman Khalifa over his subjects, thus ensuring their loyalty to him.

In 1580, a rebellion broke out in the eastern part of Akbar's empire, and a number of fatwas, declaring Akbar to be a heretic, were issued by Qazis. Akbar suppressed the rebellion and handed out severe punishments to the Qazis.

Throughout his reign, Akbar was a patron of influential Muslim scholars such as Mir Ahmed Nasrallah Thattvi and Tahir Muhammad Thattvi.

=== Din-i Ilahi ===
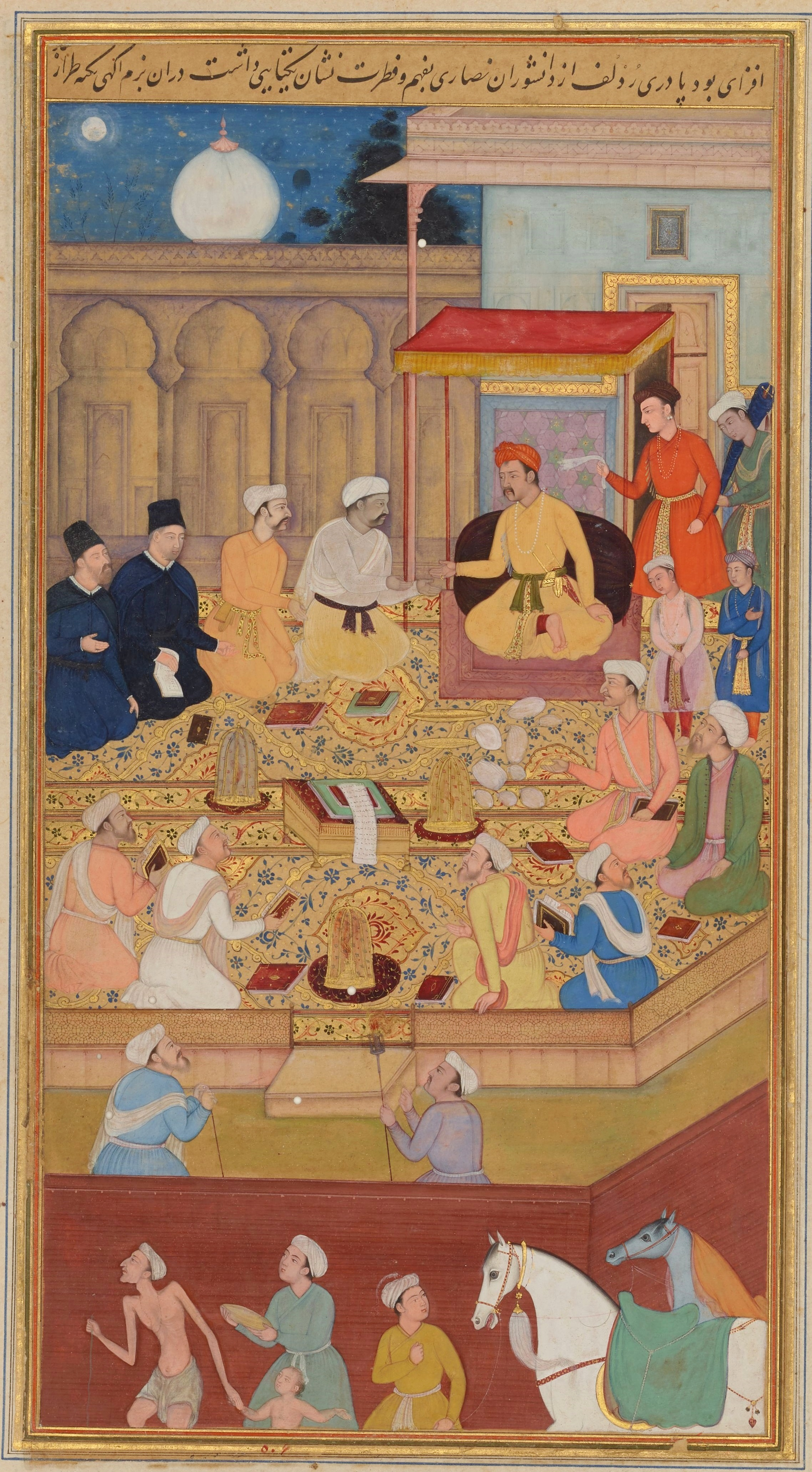
Akbar holds a religious assembly of different faiths in the Ibadat Khana in Fatehpur Sikri.

Akbar was deeply interested in religious and philosophical matters. An orthodox Muslim at the outset, he later came to be influenced by the Sufi mysticism that was being preached in the country at that time. He moved away from orthodoxy, appointing to his court several people with liberal religious philosophies, including Abul Fazl, Faizi, and Birbal. In 1575, he built a hall called the Ibadat Khana ("House of Worship") at Fatehpur Sikri, to which he invited theologians, mystics, and selected courtiers renowned for their intellectual achievements to discuss matters of spirituality with them. These discussions, initially restricted to Muslims, were acrimonious and resulted in the participants shouting at and abusing each other. Upset by this, Akbar opened the Ibadat Khana to people of all religions as well as atheists, resulting in the scope of the discussions broadening, even extending into areas such as the validity of the Quran and the nature of God. This shocked orthodox theologians, who sought to discredit Akbar by circulating rumours of his desire to forsake Islam.

Akbar's effort to evolve a meeting point among the representatives of various religions was not successful, as each of them attempted to assert the superiority of their respective religions by denouncing other religions. The debates at the Ibadat Khana grew more acrimonious and, contrary to their purpose of leading to a better understanding among religions, instead led to greater bitterness among them, resulting in the discontinuance of the debates by Akbar in 1582.

Akbar's interaction with various religious theologians had convinced him that despite their differences, all religions had several good practices, which he sought to combine into a new religious movement known as Din-i-Ilahi. Virtues in Din-i-Ilahi included generosity, forgiveness, abstinence, prudence, wisdom, kindness, and piety. Celibacy was respected, chastity enforced, the slaughter of animals was discouraged, and there were no sacred scriptures or a priestly hierarchy. A leading noble of Akbar's court, Aziz Koka, wrote a letter to him from Mecca in 1594 arguing that the discipleship promoted by Akbar amounted to nothing more than a desire on Akbar's part to portray his superiority regarding religious matters. To commemorate Din-e-Ilahi, Akbar changed the name of Prayag to Allahabad (pronounced as ilahabad) in 1583.

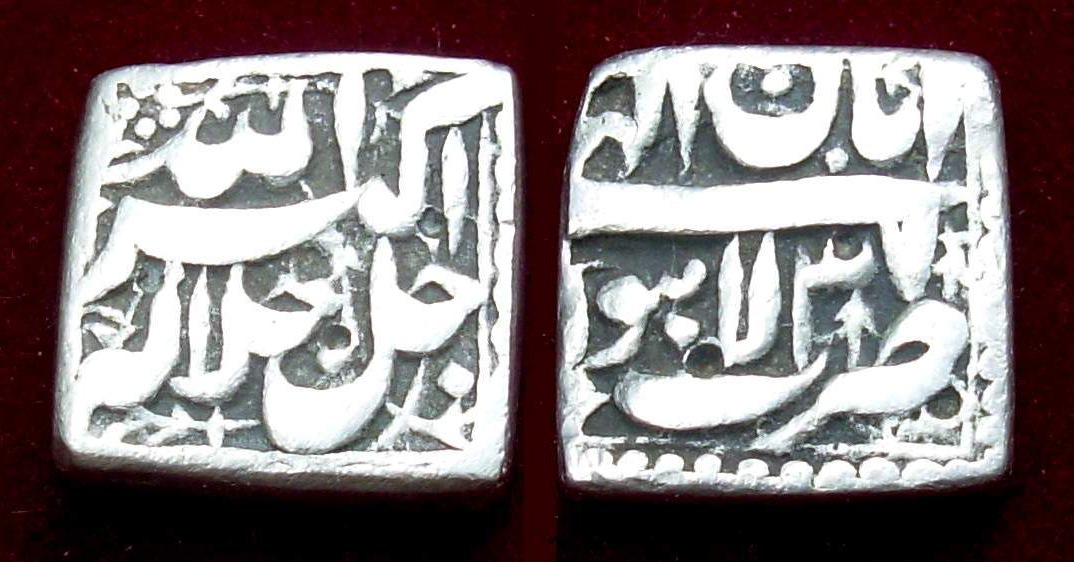
Silver square rupee of Akbar, Lahore mint, struck in Aban month of Ilahi

Some modern scholars claim that Akbar did not initiate a new religion, instead introducing what Oscar R. Gómez has called a transtheistic outlook, derived from tantric Tibetan Buddhism, and that Akbar did not use the word Din-i-Ilahi.

Scholars have also argued that the theory that Din-i-Ilahi was a new religion is a misconception that arose because of erroneous translations of Abul Fazl's work by British historians. Historian M. Athar Ali wrote that the policy of sulh-e-kul, which formed the essence of Din-i-Ilahi, was adopted by Akbar not merely for religious purposes, but as a part of general imperial administrative policy. This also formed the basis for Akbar's policy of religious tolerance. At the time of Akbar's death in 1605, there were no signs of discontent among his Muslim subjects, and even theologians like Abdu'l Haq accepted that close ties remained.

=== Relation with Hindus ===
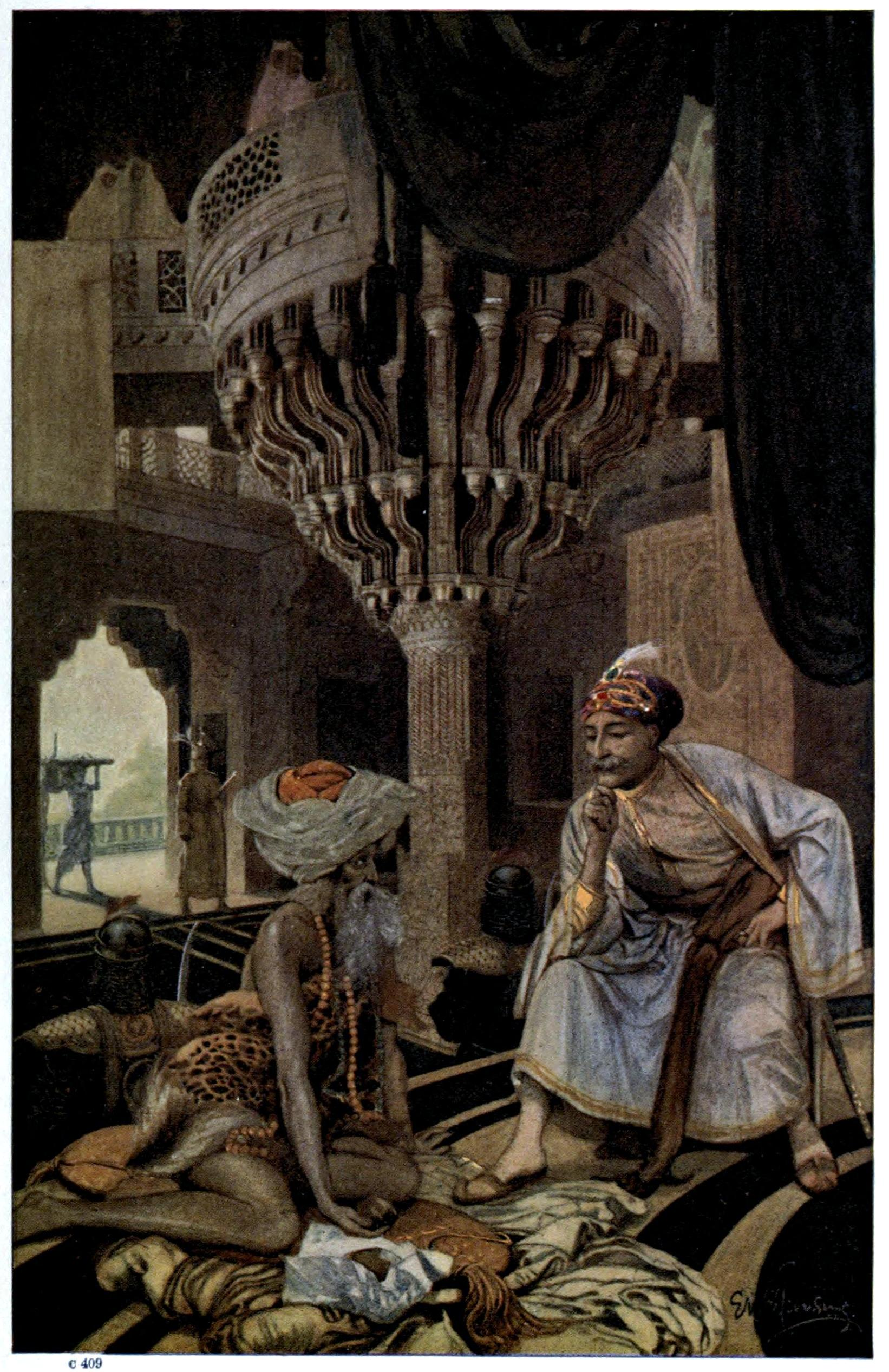
The great Mogul discoursing with a Humble Fakir

Akbar decreed that Hindus who had been forced to convert to Islam could reconvert to Hinduism without facing the death penalty. Akbar was well-liked by Hindus, who sang religious hymns to him and his eulogies.

Akbar practised several Hindu customs. He celebrated Diwali and allowed Brahman priests to tie jewelled strings around his wrists by way of blessing. Following his lead, many nobles took to wearing rakhi (protection charms). He renounced beef and forbade the sale of all meats on certain days.

His son Jahangir and grandson Shahjahan maintained many of Akbar's concessions, such as the ban on cow slaughter, having only vegetarian dishes on certain days of the week, and drinking only Ganges water. When Akbar was in Punjab, 200 miles away from the Ganges, water was sealed in large jars and transported to him. He referred to the Ganges water as the "water of immortality".

=== Relation with Jains ===
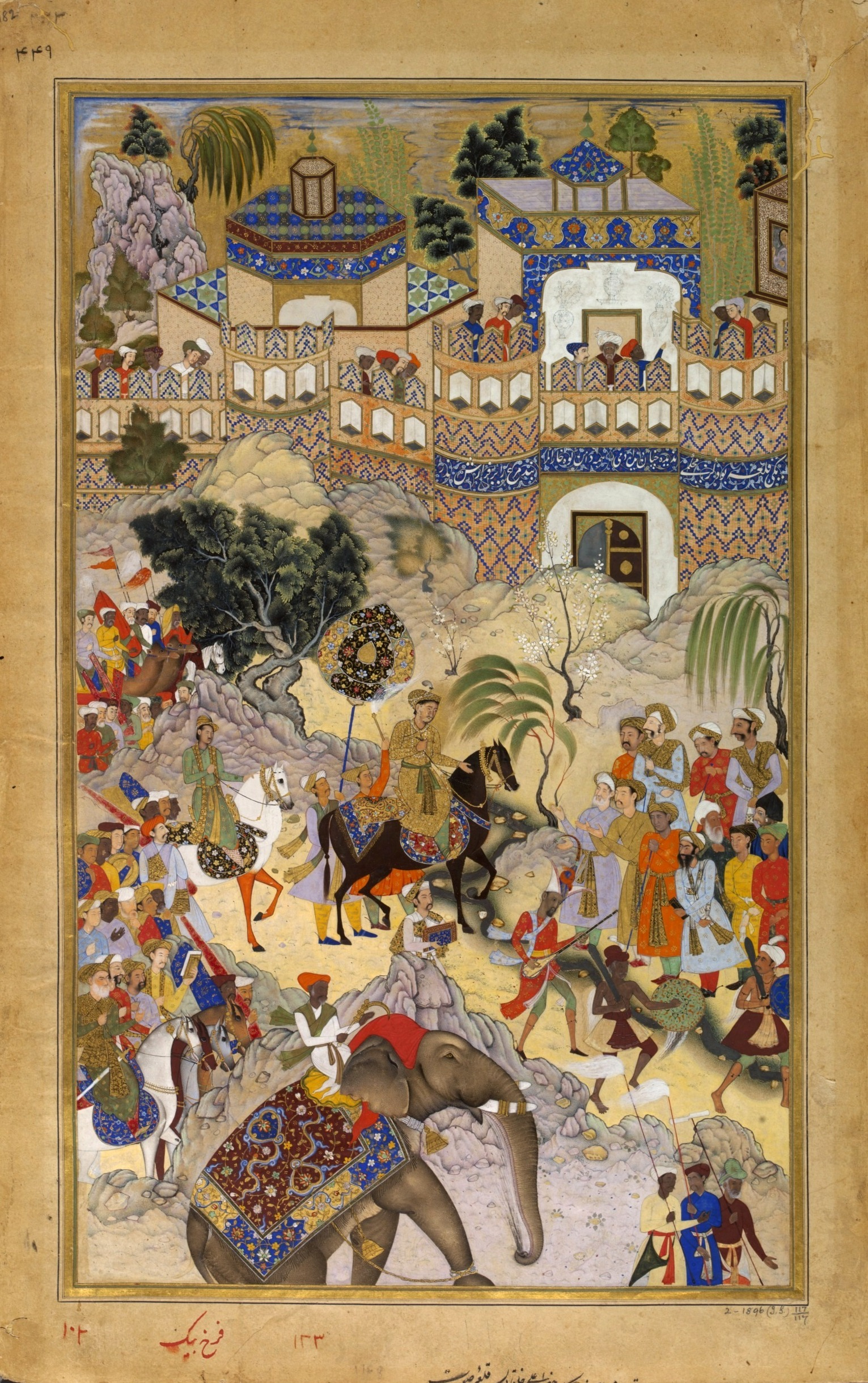
Akbar enters Surat triumphantly.

Akbar regularly held discussions with Jain scholars and was impacted by their teachings. His first encounter with Jain rituals was when he saw a procession of a Jain Shravaka named Champa after a six-month-long fast. Impressed by her power and devotion, he invited her guru, Hiravijaya, to Fatehpur Sikri. Hiravijaya accepted the invitation and travelled to the Mughal capital from Gujarat.

Akbar was impressed with his scholarly approach. He held several inter-faith dialogues among philosophers of different religions. The arguments of Jains against eating meat persuaded him to become a vegetarian. Akbar also issued many imperial orders that were favourable for Jain interests, such as banning animal slaughter. Jain authors also wrote about their experience at the Mughal court in Sanskrit texts that are still largely unknown to Mughal historians.

In 1584, 1592, and 1598, Akbar declared "Amari Ghosana", which prohibited animal slaughter during Paryushan and Mahavira Janma Kalyanak. He removed the jizya tax from Jain pilgrim places like Palitana. Santichandra, disciple of Suri, was sent to the Emperor, who in turn left his disciples Bhanuchandra and Siddhichandra in the court. Akbar invited Hiravijaya Suri's successor Vijayasena Suri to his court who visited him between 1593 and 1595. Akbar's religious tolerance was not followed by his son Jahangir, who later threatened Bhanuchandra.

== Historical accounts ==
=== Personality ===
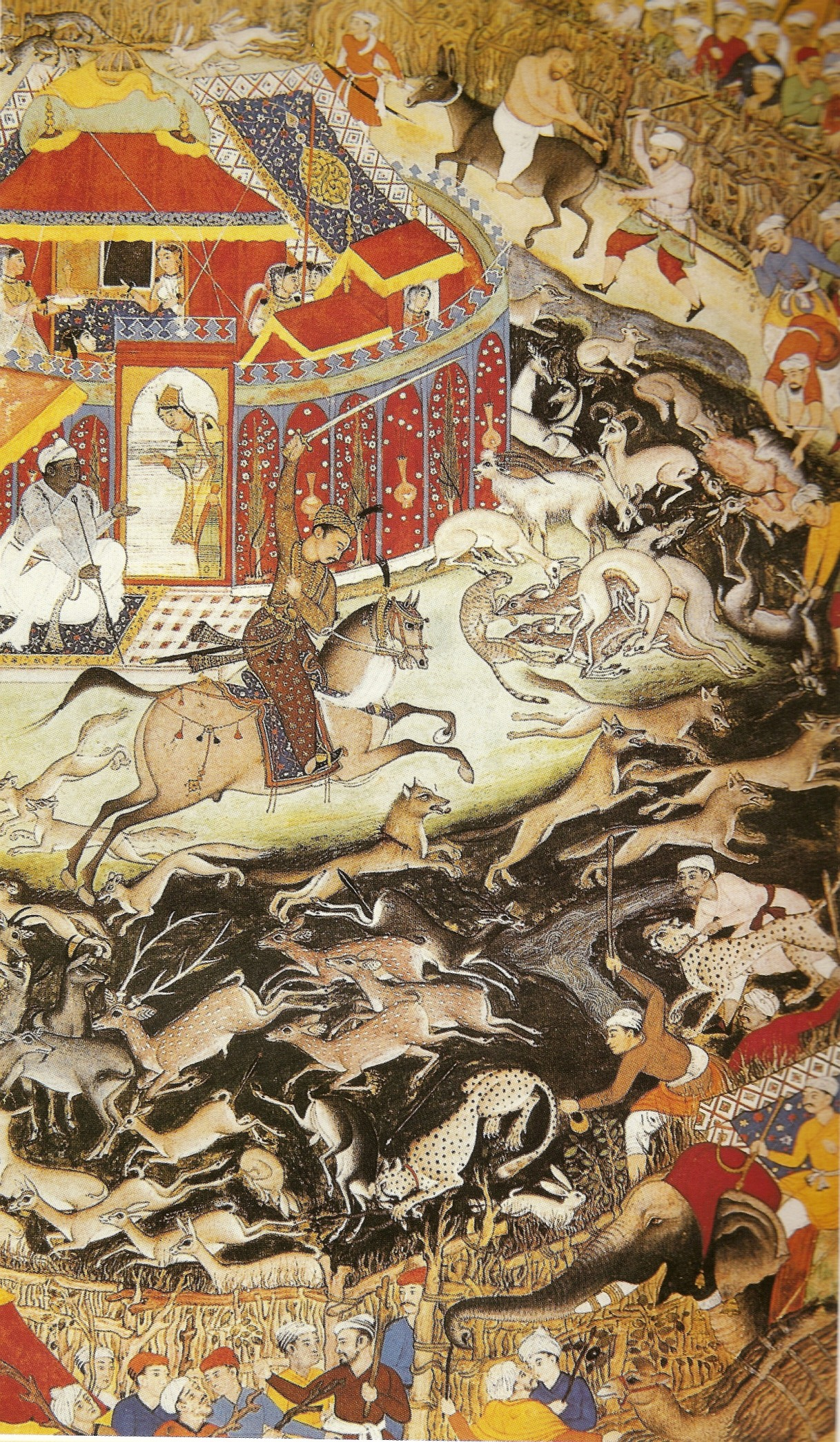
Akbar hunting with cheetahs, c. 1602

Akbar's reign was chronicled extensively by his court historian Abul Fazl in the books Akbarnama and Ain-i-akbari. Other contemporary sources of Akbar's reign include the works of Badayuni, Shaikhzada Rashidi, and Shaikh Ahmed Sirhindi.

Akbar was a warrior, emperor, general, animal trainer (reputedly keeping thousands of hunting cheetahs during his reign and training many himself), and theologian. Believed to be dyslexic, he was read to every day and had a remarkable memory. He created a library of over 24,000 volumes written in Sanskrit, Urdu, Persian, Greek, Latin, Arabic, and Kashmiri; the library was staffed by many scholars, translators, artists, calligraphers, scribes, bookbinders, and readers, and he did much of the cataloguing himself.

Akbar was said to have been a wise emperor and a sound judge of character. His son and heir, Jahangir, wrote effusive praise of Akbar's character in his memoirs, and dozens of anecdotes to illustrate his virtues. According to Jahangir, Akbar was "of the hue of wheat; his eyes and eyebrows were black, and his complexion rather dark than fair". Antoni de Montserrat, the Catalan Jesuit who visited his court, described him as follows:

One could easily recognize even at first glance that he is King. He has broad shoulders, somewhat bandy legs well-suited for horsemanship, and a light brown complexion. He carries his head bent towards the right shoulder. His forehead is broad and open, his eyes so bright and flashing that they seem like a sea shimmering in the sunlight. His eyelashes are very long. His eyebrows are not strongly marked. His nose is straight and small though not insignificant. His nostrils are widely open as though in derision. Between the left nostril and the upper lip there is a mole. He shaves his beard but wears a moustache. He limps in his left leg though he has never received an injury there.

Akbar was not tall, but powerfully built and very agile. He was also noted for various acts of courage. One such incident occurred on his way back from Malwa to Agra when Akbar was 19 years old. Akbar rode alone in advance of his escort and was confronted by a tigress who, along with her cubs, came out from the shrubbery across his path. When the tigress charged the emperor, he was alleged to have dispatched the animal with his sword in a solitary blow. His approaching attendants found the emperor standing quietly by the side of the dead animal.

Abul Fazl, as well as Akbar's critic Badayuni, described him as having a commanding personality. He was notable for his command in battle, and, "like Alexander of Macedon, was always ready to risk his life, regardless of political consequences". He often plunged on his horse into flooded rivers during the rainy seasons and safely crossed them. He rarely indulged in cruelty and is said to have been affectionate towards his relatives. He pardoned his brother Hakim, who had rebelled. On rare occasions, he dealt cruelly with offenders, such as his maternal uncle Muazzam and his foster-brother Adham Khan, who was twice defenestrated for drawing Akbar's wrath.

To defend his stance that speech arose from hearing, he carried out a language deprivation experiment, and had children raised in isolation, not allowed to be spoken to, and pointed out that as they grew older, they remained mute.

=== Hagiography ===
During Akbar's reign, the ongoing process of inter-religious discourse and syncretism resulted in a series of religious attributions to him in terms of positions of assimilation, doubt, or uncertainty, which he either assisted himself or left unchallenged. Such hagiographical accounts of Akbar traversed a wide range of denominational and sectarian spaces, including several accounts by Parsis, Jains, and Jesuit missionaries, apart from contemporary accounts by Brahminical and Muslim orthodoxy. Existing sects and denominations, as well as various religious figures who represented popular worship felt they had a claim to him. The diversity of these accounts is attributed to the fact that his reign resulted in the formation of a flexible centralised state accompanied by personal authority and cultural heterogeneity.

=== Akbarnāma, the Book of Akbar ===
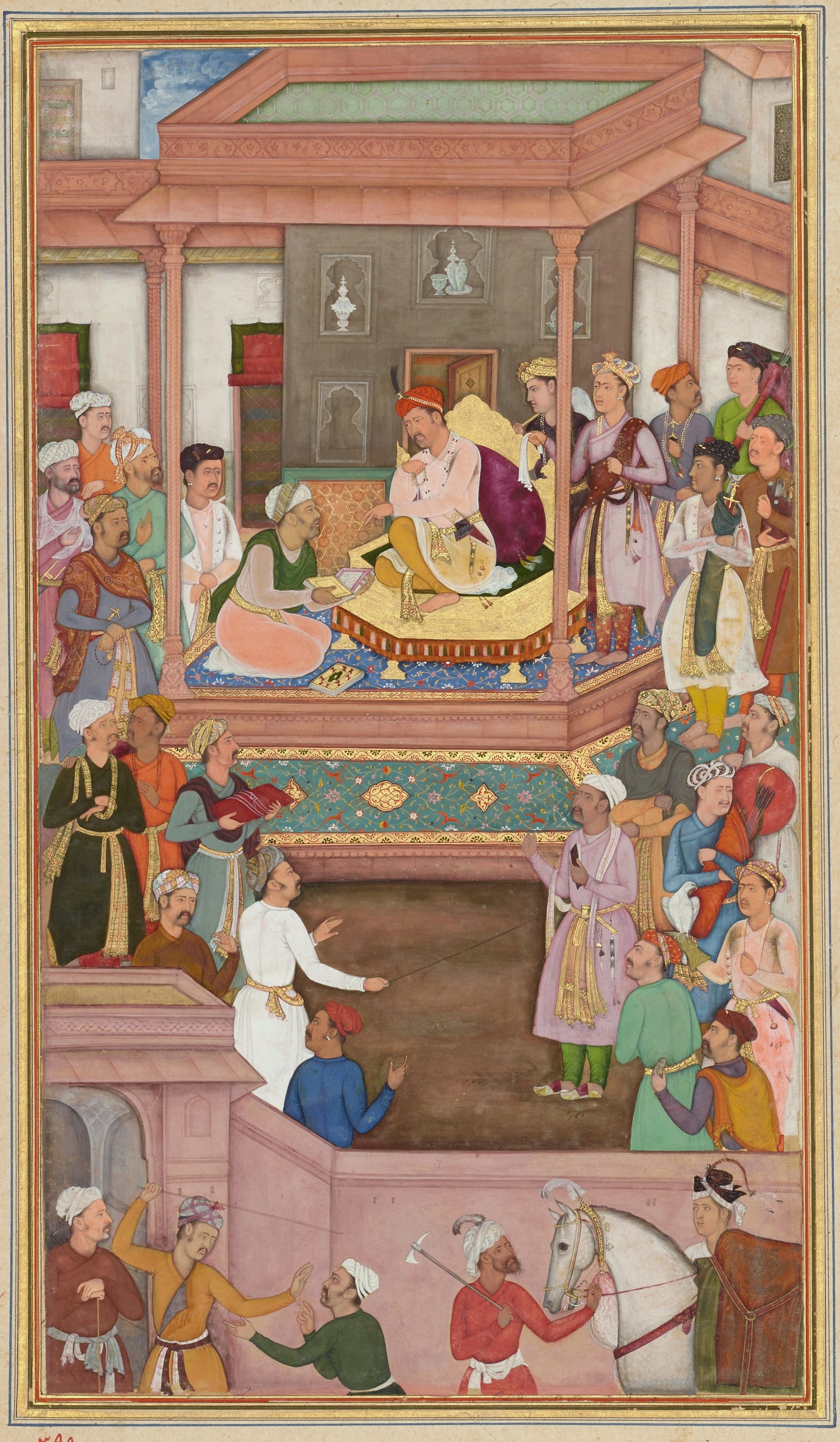
Abu'l-Fazl ibn Mubarak presenting Akbarnama to Akbar, Mughal miniature

The Akbarnāma (Persian: اکبر نامہ), which literally means Book of Akbar, is an official biographical account of Akbar written in Persian. It includes vivid and detailed descriptions of his life and times. The work was commissioned by Akbar, and written by Abul Fazl, one of the Nine Jewels (Hindi: Navaratnas) of Akbar's royal court. The book reportedly took seven years to complete and the original manuscripts contained a number of paintings supporting the texts. The paintings are in the Mughal school of painting, and included works of masters of the imperial workshop, including Basawan, whose use of portraiture in its illustrations was an innovation in Indian art.

== Consorts and concubines ==
Akbar's first wife and one of the chief consorts was his cousin, Princess Ruqaiya Sultan Begum, the only daughter of his paternal uncle, Prince Hindal Mirza, and his wife Sultanam Begum. In 1551, Hindal Mirza died fighting against Kamran Mirza's forces, leaving Humayun deeply grieved by the loss of his brother. Following Hindal's death, Akbar received his uncle's retainers, lands, and military command in connection with his appointment as governor of Ghazni, while Hindal's daughter Ruqaiya Sultan Begum was betrothed to him. Their marriage was solemnised several years later near Jalandhar, Punjab, when both were about fourteen years old. She was a senior-ranking wife of Akbar. She died childless in January 1626 and was buried next to her father's grave.

His second wife was the elder daughter of Jamal Khan, a member of a leading zamindar family. Their marriage, solemnized in Delhi in 1556, was intended to foster good relations with the zamindars

His third wife was the daughter of Abdullah Khan Mughal. The marriage took place in 1557 during the Siege of Mankot. Bairam Khan did not approve of this marriage because Abdullah's sister was married to Akbar's uncle, Prince Kamran Mirza, and so he regarded Abdullah as a partisan of Kamran. Bairam Khan opposed the match until Nasir-al-Mulk persuaded him that he could not oppose it. Nasir-al-Mulk organised a joyful gathering and a grand feast.

His fourth wife and one of his three chief consorts was his cousin, Salima Sultan Begum, the daughter of Nur-ud-din Muhammad Mirza and his wife Gulrukh Begum, also known as Gulrang, the daughter of Emperor Babur. She was at first betrothed to Bairam Khan by Humayun. After Bairam Khan died in 1561, Akbar married her in the same year. She was the foster mother of Akbar's second son, Murad Mirza. She was a poet and actively played a role in the politics of the Mughal court during Akbar's and Jahangir's reigns. She is regarded as the senior-most wife of Akbar. She died childless on 2 January 1613.

Akbar's fifth and favourite wife, Mariam-uz-Zamani, commonly known by the misnomer Jodha Bai, was the daughter of the ruler of Amer, Raja Bharmal, and by birth, was of Rajput caste. They got married on 6 February 1562 at the imperial military camp in Sambhar, Rajasthan, near Amer, and became one of Akbar's chief consorts. She gradually became one of his influential wives and was said to possess uncommon beauty. Shortly after marriage, Akbar named her 'Wali Nimat Begum' (Blessings/Gift of God). Their marriage took place when Akbar was on his way back from Ajmer after offering prayers to the tomb of Moinuddin Chishti. Raja Bharmal had conveyed to Akbar that he was being harassed by his brother-in-law Sharif-ud-din Mirza (the Mughal hakim of Mewat). Akbar insisted that the Raja should submit to him personally; it was also suggested that his daughter should be married to him as a sign of complete submission. Her marriage is considered one of the most important events in the history of the Mughal Empire. She became his first wife to have given birth to Akbar's sons. In 1564, she delivered twins named Mirza Hassan and Mirza Hussain and in 1569, she was honoured with the title of 'Mariam-uz-Zamani' after giving birth to their third and first surviving son, Prince Salim (the future emperor Jahangir), the heir to the throne. She was also the foster mother of Akbar's favourite son, Daniyal Mirza.

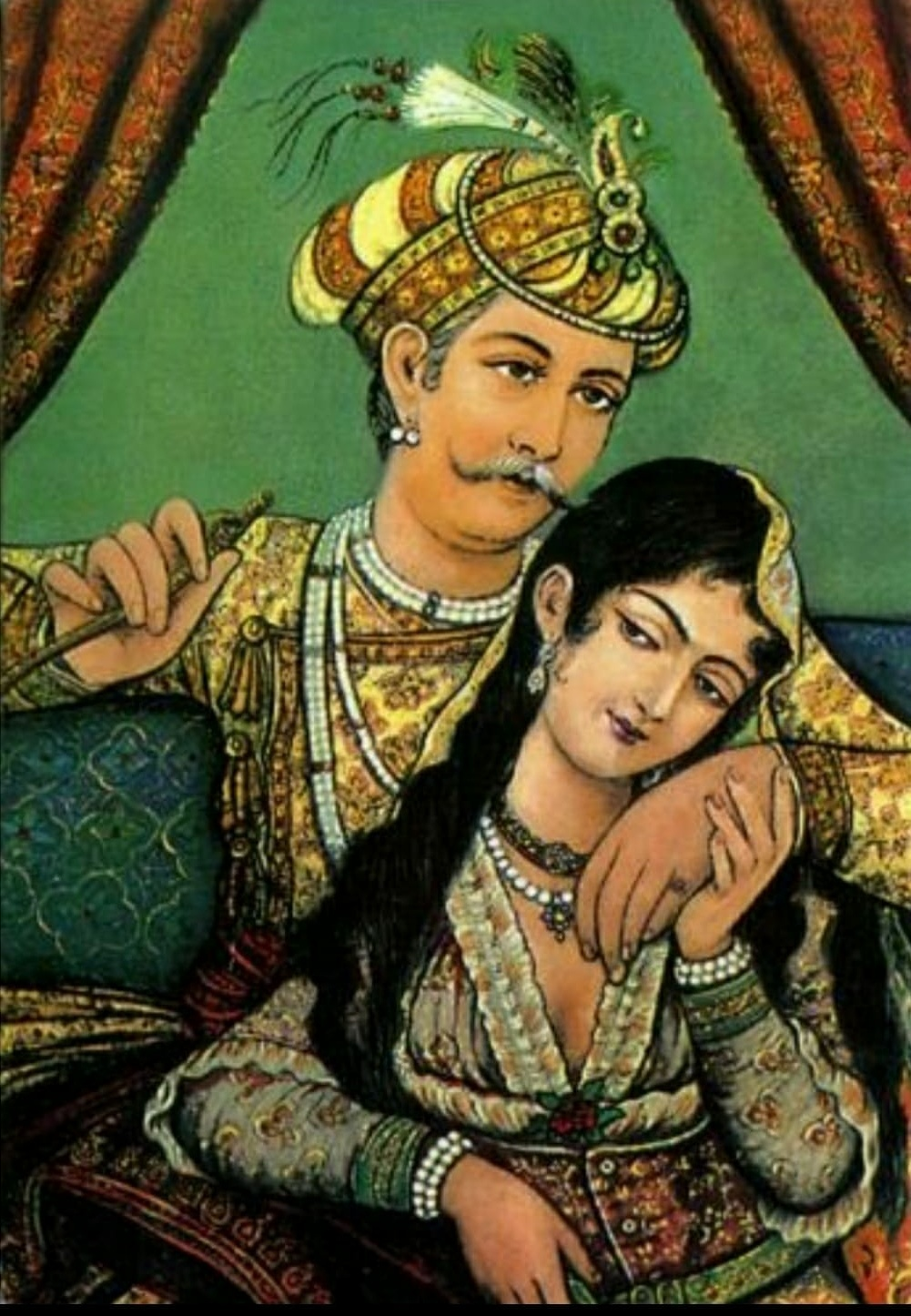
Portrait of Jalaluddin Muhammad Akbar with Mariam Zamani Begum, commonly known as Jodha Bai

She commanded a high rank in the imperial harem and was a recipient of many privileges. She was an intellectual woman who held a considerable influence in Akbar's court and is known as the prime driving force for Akbar's promotion of secularism and religious neutrality. She was also a great female patron of the architecture of her time. She died on 19 May 1623 in Agra and was buried in a grave close to her husband, Akbar, in Sikandra, Agra.

In 1562, Akbar married the former wife of Abdul Wasi, the son of Shaikh Bada, lord of Agra. Akbar was enamored with her beauty and ordered Abdul Wasi to divorce her. Another of his wives was Gauhar-un-Nissa Begum, the daughter of Shaikh Muhammad Bakhtiyar and the sister of Shaikh Jamal Bakhtiyar. Their dynasty was called Din Laqab they lived in Chandwar and Jalesar near Agra. He married the daughter of Jagmal Rathore, son of Rao Viramde of Merta in 1562.

His next marriage took place in 1564 to the daughter of Miran Mubarak Shah, the ruler of Khandesh. In 1564, he sent presents to the court with a request that his daughter be married to Akbar. Miran's request acceded and an order was issued. Itimad Khan was sent with Miran's ambassadors. Miran welcomed Itimad with honour and despatched his daughter with him. A large number of nobles accompanied her. The marriage took place in September 1564 when she reached Akbar's court. As a dowry, Mubarak Shah ceded Bijagarh and Handia to his imperial son-in-law.

He married another Rajput princess in 1570, Raj Kunwari, daughter of Kanha, the brother of Rai Kalyan Mal, the ruler of Bikanir. The marriage took place in 1570 when Akbar came to this part of the country. Kalyan made a homage to Akbar and requested that his brother's daughter be married to him. Akbar accepted his proposal, and the marriage was arranged. He also married Bhanmati, daughter of Bhim Raj, another brother of Rai Kalyan Mal. He also married Nathi Bai, daughter of Rawal Har Rai, the ruler of Jaisalmer in 1570. Rawal had sent a request that his daughter be married to Akbar. The proposal was accepted by Akbar. Raja Bhagwan Das was despatched on this service. The marriage ceremony took place after Akbar's return from Nagor. She was the mother of Princess Mahi Begum, who died on 8 April 1577. In 1570, Narhardas, a grandson of Rao Viramde of Merta, married his sister, Puram Bai, to Akbar in return for Akbar's support of Keshodas's claims on Merta.

Another of his wives was Bhakkari Begum, the daughter of Sultan Mahmud of Bhakkar. On 2 July 1572, Akbar's envoy Itimad Khan reached Mahmud's court to escort his daughter to Akbar. Itimad Khan brought a dress, a bejewelled scimitar belt, a horse with a saddle and reins, and four elephants. Mahmud celebrated the occasion by holding extravagant feasts for fifteen days. On the day of the wedding, the ulema, saints, and nobles were honoured with rewards. Mahmud offered 30,000 rupees in cash and kind to Itimad Khan and sent his daughter with a grand dowry and an entourage. She came to Ajmer and waited upon Akbar. The gifts of Sultan Mahmud, carried by the delegation, were presented to the ladies of the imperial harem.

His eleventh wife was Qasima Banu Begum, the daughter of Arab Shah. The marriage took place in 1575. A fest was held, at which the high officers and other pillars of the state were present. In 1577, the Rawal Askaran of Dungarpur State requested that his daughter be married to Akbar. Akbar granted his request. Rai Loukaran and Rajah Birbar, servants of the Rajah, were sent from Dihalpur to do the honour of conveying his daughter. The two delivered her to Akbar's court where the marriage took place on 12 July 1577.

His twelfth wife was Bibi Daulat Shad. She was the mother of Princess Shakr-un-Nissa Begum, and Princess Aram Banu Begum born on 22 December 1584. His next wife was the daughter of Shams Chak, a Kashmiri. The marriage took place on 3 November 1592. In 1593, he married the daughter of Qazi Isa and the cousin of Najib Khan. Najib told Akbar that his uncle had made his daughter a present for him. Akbar accepted his representation and on 3 July 1593, he visited Najib Khan's house and married Qazi Isa's daughter.

At some point, Akbar took into his harem Rukmavati, a daughter Maldeo Rathore, Rao of Marwar, by his mistress, Tipu Gudi. This was a dolo union as opposed to a formal marriage, representing the bride's lower status in her father's household, and serving as an expression of vassalage to an overlord. The dating of this event is not recorded.

== Death ==
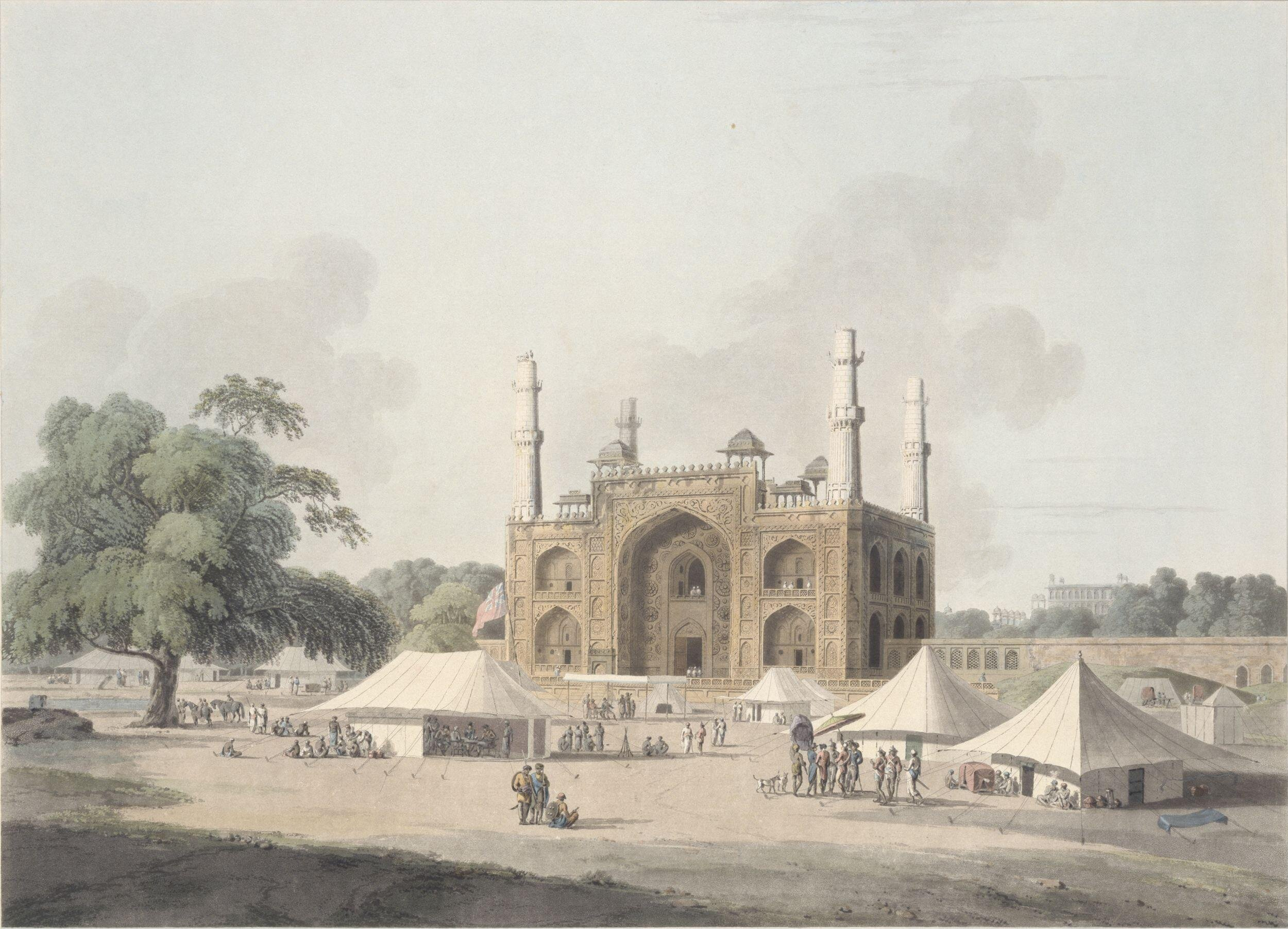
Gate of Akbar's mausoleum at Sikandra, Agra, 1795

On 3 October 1605, Akbar fell ill from an attack of dysentery, from which he never recovered. He is believed to have died on 26 October 1605. He was buried at his mausoleum in Sikandra, Agra, which lies a kilometer next to the tomb of Mariam-uz-Zamani, his favourite consort.

== Legacy ==
Akbar firmly entrenched the authority of the Mughal Empire in India and beyond, after it had been threatened by the Afghans during his father's reign, establishing its military and diplomatic superiority.

Folk tales revolving around him and Birbal, one of his navaratnas, are popular in India. He and his Hindu wife, Mariam-uz-Zamani are widely popular, as the latter is believed to have been the prime inspiration and driving force for Akbar's promotion of secularism and universal benevolence.

Citing Akbar's melding of the disparate "fiefdoms" of India into the Mughal Empire, as well as the lasting legacy of "pluralism and tolerance" that "underlies the values of the modern republic of India", Time included him in its list of top 25 world leaders.

Akbar's legacy is largely negative in Pakistan. Historian Mubarak Ali, in a study of the image of Akbar in Pakistani textbooks, has observed that Akbar "is conveniently ignored and not mentioned in any school textbook from class one to matriculation", as opposed to the omnipresence of emperor Aurangzeb. He quotes historian Ishtiaq Hussain Qureshi, who said that, due to his religious tolerance, "Akbar had so weakened Islam through his policies that it could not be restored to its dominant position in the affairs". A common thread among Pakistani historians is criticism of Akbar's Rajput policy. Ali has stated that "Akbar is criticized for bringing Muslims and Hindus together as one nation and putting the separate identity of the Muslims in danger. This policy of Akbar contradicts the theory of Two-Nation and therefore makes him an unpopular figure in Pakistan."

== Issue ==
Name	Birth	Death	Notes
By Mariam-uz-Zamani (c. 1542 – 19 May 1623)
Fatima Banu Begum	c. 1562	infancy	died in infancy
Hassan Mirza	19 October 1564	5 November 1564	twin with Hussain Mirza; died shortly after birth
Hussain Mirza	19 October 1564	29 October 1564	twin with Hassan Mirza; died shortly after birth
Jahangir	31 August 1569	28 October 1627	Born Salim Mirza; succeeded Akbar to the throne
By concubines (various)
Murad Mirza	15 June 1570	12 May 1599	Entrusted to Salima Sultan Begum for early years; returned to mother's care before 1575
Daniyal Mirza	11 September 1572	19 March 1605	Fostered by Mariam-uz-Zamani
By Bibi Salima
Shahzadi Khanum	21 November 1569	unknown	Fostered by Mariam Makani; married Muzaffar Hussain Mirza, Timurid Prince
By Nathi Bai
Mahi Begum	unknown	7 April 1577	
By Bibi Daulat Shad
Shakr-un-Nissa Begum	unknown	1 January 1653	Married Shahrukh Mirza
Aram Banu Begum	22 December 1584	17 June 1624	
Adopted children
Kishnavati Bai	unknown	August 1609	Adopted; daughter of Sekhavat Kachvahi Durjan Sal; married Sawai Raja Sur Singh of Marwar; mother of Gaj Singh of Marwar and Manbhavati Bai

== In popular culture ==
=== Films and television ===
- Shahenshah Akbar is a 1943 Indian Hindi-language film about the emperor.
- Akbar was portrayed in the award-winning 1960 Hindi movie Mughal-e-Azam (The Great Mughal), in which his character was played by Prithviraj Kapoor.
- In the 1958 Urdu film Anarkali, he was portrayed by Himalyawala.
- The Government of India's Films Division produced Akbar, a documentary film about the emperor, in 1967, directed by Shanti S. Varma. It won the National Film Award for Best Educational/Motivational/Instructional Film.
- Om Shivpuri played Akbar in the 1978 movie Bhakti Mein Shakti.
- Akbar Saleem Anarkali is a 1979 Indian Telugu-language film about the Anarkali legend directed by N. T. Rama Rao, with Rao also portraying the role of Akbar.
- Akbar was portrayed by Amjad Khan in the 1979 movie Meera.
- Akbar was portrayed by Hrithik Roshan in the 2008 Bollywood film Jodhaa Akbar.
- Akbar and Birbal were portrayed in the Hindi series Akbar-Birbal aired on Zee TV in the late 1990s where Akbar's role was played by Vikram Gokhale.
- A television series, called Akbar the Great, directed by Akbar Khan was aired on DD National in the 1990s.
- In 2013–2015, a television series, called Jodha Akbar aired on Zee TV, in which the role of Akbar was played by actor Rajat Tokas.
- In the Motu Patlu episode "Motu Akbar The Great", John fools Motu into believing that he is playing Akbar in a Hit Film.
- Akbar was portrayed by Uday Tikekar in EPIC channel's critically acclaimed historical drama Siyaasat (based on the novel The Twentieth Wife).
- In Sony TV's historical drama Bharat Ka Veer Putra – Maharana Pratap, Akbar was at first portrayed by Krip Suri and later by Avinesh Rekhi.
- Akbar is portrayed by Kiku Sharda in BIG Magic's sitcom Akbar Birbal.
- Mohammed Iqbal Khan played the role of Akbar in ABP News' documentary series, Bharatvarsh.
- Akbar Rakht Se Takht Ka Safar is a 2017 Indian drama television series tracing Akbar's journey to the Mughal throne.
- Shahbaz Khan played the role of Akbar in the Colors television show Dastaan-E-Mohabbat Salim Anarkali.
- Ali Asgar portrayed the emperor in the 2020 Indian comedy television series, Akbar Ka Bal Birbal.
- Naseeruddin Shah portrayed him in ZEE5's web series Taj: Divided by Blood.

=== Fiction ===
- Akbar is a principal character in Indu Sundaresan's award-winning novel The Twentieth Wife (2002) as well as in its sequel The Feast of Roses (2003).
- A fictionalised Akbar plays an important supporting role in Kim Stanley Robinson's 2002 novel, The Years of Rice and Salt.
- Akbar is also a major character in Salman Rushdie's 2008 novel The Enchantress of Florence.
- In Kunal Basu's The Miniaturist, the story revolves around a young painter during Akbar's time who paints his own version of the Akbarnamu.
- Akbar is mentioned as 'Raja Baadshah' in the Chhattisgarhi folktale of "Mohna de gori kayina".
- Akbar is the main character in Empire of the Moghul: Ruler of the World by Alex Rutherford, the third book in a sextet based on the six great Mughal Emperors of the Mughal Dynasty.

=== Video games ===
- Akbar is featured in the video game Sid Meier's Civilization IV: Beyond the Sword as a "great general" available in the game.
- Akbar is the AI Personality of India in Age of Empires III: The Asian Dynasties.

== See also ==
- Akbar II
- Ashoka
- List of people known as the Great

== Bibliography ==
- Abul Fazl 'Allami (1873). The Ain i Akbari. Vol. I. Translated by Blochmann, Heinrich. Calcutta, India: The Asiatic Society of Bengal.
- Abul Fazl 'Allami (1907). The Akbar Nama of Abu-l-Fazl. Vol. I. Translated by Beveridge, Henry (2000 reproduction ed.). Calcutta, India: The Asiatic Society.
- Abul Fazl 'Allami (1907). The Akbar Nama of Abu-l-Fazl. Vol. II. Translated by Beveridge, Henry. Calcutta, India: Asiatic Society.
- Abul Fazl 'Allami (1907). The Akbar Nama of Abu-l-Fazl. Vol. III. Translated by Beveridge, Henry. Calcutta, India: Asiatic Society.
- Ahloowalia, B. S. (2009). Invasion of the Genes: Genetic Heritage of India. Strategic Book Publishing. ISBN 978-1-60860-691-7. Archived from the original on 8 April 2023.
- Ahsan, Aitzaz (2005). The Indus Saga. Roli Books Private Limited. ISBN 978-9-351-94073-9.
- Akhtar, Muhammad Saleem (February 1983). Sind under the Mughals: An Introduction to, translation of and commentary on the Mazhar-i Shahjahani of Yusuf Mirak (1044/1634) (PDF) (PhD). Australian National university. pp. 78, 79, 81. Archived (PDF) from the original on 31 October 2022.
- Ali, M. Athar (2006). Mughal India: Studies in Polity, Ideas, Society and Culture. Oxford University Press. ISBN 978-0-19-569661-5.
- Ali, Mubarak (September–October 1992). "Akbar in Pakistani Textbooks". Social Scientist. 20 (9/10): 73–76. doi:10.2307/3517719. ISSN 0970-0293. JSTOR 3517719.
- Badayuni, Abdul Qadir (1884). Muntakhab-ut-Tawarikh. Vol. II. Translated by Lowe, W. H. Calcutta, India: Asiatic Society of Bengal.
- Banerji, S. K. (1938). Humāyun Bādshāh. Calcutta, India: Oxford University Press. OCLC 952877148.
- Beveridge, H. (January–April 1900). "The Garden of Climes". The Imperial and Asiatic Quarterly Review and Oriental and Colonial Record. IX (17–18): 145–162.
- Black, Antony (2011). The History of Islamic Political Thought: From the Prophet to the Present. Edinburgh University Press. ISBN 978-0-7486-8878-4. Archived from the original on 22 September 2023.
- Burke, S. M. (1989). Akbar: The Greatest Mogul. Munshiram Manoharlal Publishers.
- Busch, Allison (2011). Poetry of Kings: The Classical Hindi Literature of Mughal India. Oxford University Press. ISBN 978-0-19-976592-8.
- Chandra, Satish (2007). History of Medieval India. New Delhi, India: Orient Longman. ISBN 978-81-250-3226-7.
- Chandra, Satish (2001). Medieval India: From Sultanat to the Mughals. Vol. I. Har-Anand Publications. ISBN 978-81-241-0522-1.
- Chandra, Satish (2005) [First published 1999]. Medieval India: from Sultanat to the Mughals. Vol. II (Revised ed.). New Delhi, India: Har-Anand Publications. ISBN 978-81-241-1066-9.
- Chandra, Satish (1993). Mughal Religious Policies, the Rajputs & the Deccan. New Delhi, India: Vikas Publishing House. ISBN 978-0-7069-6385-4.
- Chaudhary, S. N. Roy (2011). Restoration of Split Milk. Gyan Publishing House. ISBN 978-81-212-1046-1.
- Chua, Amy (2007). Day of Empire: How Hyperpowers Rise to Global Dominance – and Why They Fall. Doubleday. ISBN 978-0-385-51284-8.
- Codrington, K. de B. (March 1943). "Portraits of Akbar, the Great Mughal (1542–1605)". The Burlington Magazine for Connoisseurs. 82 (480): 64–67. JSTOR 868499.
- Collier, Dirk (2011). The Emperor's writings: Memories of Akbar the great. Amaryllis. ISBN 978-81-910673-6-1.
- Collingham, Lizzie (2006). Curry: A Tale of Cooks and Conquerors. Oxford University Press. ISBN 978-0-19-532001-5.
- Conder, Josiah (1828). The Modern Traveller: a popular description. R. H. Tims.
- Crooke, W. (1912). "Fatehpur-Sīkrī". In Hastings, James (ed.). Encyclopædia of Religion and Ethics. Vol. V. Charles Scribner's Sons.
- Deefholts, Margaret; Deefholts, Glenn; Acharya, Quentine (2006). The Way We Were: Anglo-Indian Cronicles. Calcutta Tiljallah Relief Incorporated. ISBN 0-9754639-3-4.
- Durant, Will (2011) [First published 1935]. Our Oriental Heritage: The Story of Civilization. Simon and Schuster. ISBN 978-1-4516-4668-9.
- Eaton, Richard M. (2019). India in the Persianate Age. University of California Press. ISBN 978-0-520-97423-4.
- Elgood, Robert (1995). Firearms of the Islamic World. I. B. Tauris. ISBN 978-1-85043-963-9.
- Eraly, Abraham (2000) [First published 1997]. Emperors of the Peacock Throne: The Saga of the Great Moghuls. Penguin Books. ISBN 978-0-14-100143-2.
- Eraly, Abraham (2007) [First published 1997]. The Mughal World: India's Tainted Paradise. Weidenfeld & Nicolson. ISBN 978-0-297-85209-4.
- Erskine, William (1854). A History of India Under the Two First Sovereigns of the House of Taimur, Báber and Humáyun. Vol. II. Longman, Brown, Green, and Longmans. Archived from the original on 10 August 2023.
- Farooqi, Naimur Rahman (1989). Mughal-Ottoman relations: a study of political & diplomatic relations between Mughal India and the Ottoman Empire, 1556–1748. Delhi, India: Idarah-i Adabiyat-i Delli. OCLC 20894584. Archived from the original on 22 September 2023.
- Farooqi, N. R. (2017). "An Overview of Ottoman Archival Documents and Their Relevance for Medieval Indian History". The Medieval History Journal. 20 (1): 192–229. doi:10.1177/0971945816687687. S2CID 164261762.
- Farooqi, N. R. (1996). "Six Ottoman Documents on Mughal-Ottoman Relations During The Reign of Akbar". Journal of Islamic Studies. 7 (1): 32–48. doi:10.1093/jis/7.1.32. JSTOR 26195476. Archived from the original on 2 March 2012.
- Faroqhi, Suraiya (2006). The Ottoman Empire and the World Around It. I. B. Tauris. ISBN 978-1-84511-122-9. Archived from the original on 22 September 2023.
- Ferishta, Mahomed Kasim (1909) [First published in 1829]. History of the Rise of the Mahomedan Power in India, Till the Year A.D. 1612. Vol. II. Translated by Briggs, John. Calcutta, India: R. Cambrey & Company. p. 169.
- von Garbe, Richard (1909). Akbar, Emperor of India. Translated by Robinson, Lydia G. Chicago, Illinois: The Open Court Publishing Company.
- Gibbs, J. (1883). "On two Enormous Gold Coins". Proceedings of the Asiatic Society of Bengal: 4–5.
- Gómez, Oscar R. (2013). Tantrism in the Society of Jesus – from Tibet to the Vaticcan today. Editorial MenteClara. ISBN 978-987-24510-3-5. Archived from the original on 28 November 2022.
- Gommans, Jos (2002). Mughal Warfare: Indian Frontiers and High Roads to Empire, 1500–1700. Routledge. ISBN 978-0-415-23988-2.
- Habib, Irfan (1997). Akbar and His India. New Delhi: Oxford University Press. ISBN 978-0-19-563791-5.
- Habib, Irfan (September–October 1992). "Akbar and Technology". Social Scientist. 20 (9–10): 3–15. doi:10.2307/3517712. JSTOR 3517712.
- Hasan, Nurul (2007). Religion, State and Society in Medieval India. New Delhi, India: Oxford University Press. ISBN 978-0-19-569660-8.
- Hasan Siddiqi, Mahmudul (1972). History of the Arghuns and Tarkhans of Sindh, 1507–1593: An Annotated Translation of the Relevant Parts of Mir Ma'sums Ta'rikh-i-Sindh, with an Introduction & Appendices. Institute of Sindhology, University of Sind.
- Hindu Shah, Muhammad Qasim (1595–1612). Gulshan-I-Ibrahimi. Vol. 2.
- Houtsma, M. T. (1993). E. J. Brill's First Encyclopaedia of Islam, 1913–1936, Volume 4. Brill. ISBN 978-90-04-09796-4.
- Ikram, S. M. (1964). Embree, Ainslie T. (ed.). Muslim Civilization in India. Columbia University Press. LCCN 64-14656.
- Jahangir (1999). The Jahangirnama : memoirs of Jahangir, Emperor of India. Translated by Thackston, Wheeler M. Oxford University Press. ISBN 978-0-19-512718-8.
- Jarric, du Pierre (1926). Akbar and the Jesuits. Broadway Travellers. Translated by Payne, C. H. London, England: Harper & Brothers.
- Keay, F. E. (1920). A History of Hindi Literature. Association Press.
- Khan, Iqtidar Alam (1999). Akbar and his age. Northern Book Centre. ISBN 978-81-7211-108-3.
- Khan, Iqtidar Alam (1968). "The Nobility under Akbar and the Development of His Religious Policy, 1560–80". Journal of the Royal Asiatic Society of Great Britain and Ireland. 100 (1/2): 29–36. doi:10.1017/S0035869X00126115. JSTOR 25203020. S2CID 159780897.
- Koch, Ebba (1990). Mughal architecture.
- Kulke, Hermann (2004). A history of India. Routledge. ISBN 978-0-415-32920-0.
- Lach, Donald F.; Van Kley, Edwin J. (1965). Asia in the Making of Europe. Vol. 3 pt. 1. University of Chicago Press. ISBN 978-0-226-46765-8. OCLC 295911.
- Lal, K. S. (1999). Theory and Practice of Muslim State in India. Aditya Prakashan. ISBN 978-81-86471-72-2.
- Lal, Muni (1980). Akbar. University of Michigan. ISBN 978-0-7069-1076-6.
- Lal, Ruby (2005). Domesticity and Power in the Early Mughal World. Cambridge University Press. ISBN 978-0-521-85022-3.
- Levi, Scott Cameron (2002). The Indian diaspora in Central Asia and its trade, 1550–1900. Brill. ISBN 978-90-04-12320-5.
- Majumdar, R. C., ed. (1974). The Mughul Empire. The History and Culture of the Indian People. Vol. VII. Bombay, India: Bharatiya Vidya Bhavan.
- Manchanda, Bindu (2001). Jaisalmer: The City of Golden Sands and Strange Spirits. New Delhi, India: HarperCollins. ISBN 978-81-7223-434-8.
- Khanna, Meenakshi (2007). Cultural History of Medieval India. Berghahn Books. ISBN 978-81-87358-30-5. Archived from the original on 22 September 2023.
- Mehta, Jaswant Lal (1984) [First published 1981]. Advanced Study in the History of Medieval India. Vol. II (2nd ed.). Sterling Publishers. ISBN 978-81-207-1015-3. OCLC 1008395679. Archived from the original on 22 September 2023.
- Moosvi, Shireen (2008). People, Taxation and Trade in Mughal India. New Delhi, India: Oxford University Press. ISBN 978-0-19-569315-7.
- Murray, Stuart (2009). The library: an illustrated history. Chicago, Illinois: ALA Editions. ISBN 978-1-60239-706-4.
- Muzaffar, H. Syed; Kumar, Anil; Usmani, B. D.; Gupta, Pramod (2022). History of Indian Nation. Vol. 2. K. K. Publications. ISBN 978-81-7844-129-0. Archived from the original on 27 June 2023.
- "Akbar, the Great Mughal". Nature. 150 (3812): 600–601. 21 November 1942. Bibcode:1942Natur.150R.600.. doi:10.1038/150600b0. S2CID 4084248.
- Petersen, Andrew (1996). Dictionary of Islamic Architecture. Routledge. ISBN 0-415-06084-2.
- Pletcher, Kenneth (2010). The History of India. Rosen Publishing Group. ISBN 978-1-61530-201-7.
- Prasad, Beni (1930). History of Jahangir (2nd ed.). The Indian Press.
- Prasad, Rajendra (2017) [First published 1946]. India Divided. Penguin. ISBN 978-0-14-341415-5. Archived from the original on 1 July 2023.
- Richards, John F. (1996). The Mughal Empire. Cambridge University Press. ISBN 978-0-521-56603-2.
- Safdar, Aiysha; Khan, Muhammad Azam (January–June 2021). "History of Indian Ocean – A South Indian perspective" (PDF). Journal of Indian Studies. 7 (1). Archived (PDF) from the original on 18 December 2021.
- Sangari, Kumkum (2007). "Akbar: The Name of a Conjuncture". In Grewal, J. S. (ed.). The State and Society in Medieval India. New Delhi, India: Oxford University Press. ISBN 978-0-19-566720-2.
- Sanghmitra. Jain Dharma ke Prabhavak Acharya (in Hindi). Jain Vishwa Bharati, Ladnu.
- Saran, Richard; Ziegler, Norman P. (2001a). The Mertiyo Rathors of Merta, Rajasthan. Vol. I. University of Michigan Press. ISBN 978-0-939512-43-0.
- Saran, Richard; Ziegler, Norman P. (2001b). The Mertiyo Rathors of Merta, Rajasthan. Vol. II. University of Michigan Press. ISBN 978-0-89148-085-3.
- Sarkar, Jadunath (1984). A History of Jaipur. New Delhi, India: Orient Longman. ISBN 81-250-0333-9. Archived from the original on 3 July 2023.
- Schimmel, Annemarie (2004). Waghmar, Burzine K. (ed.). The Empire of the Great Mughals: History, Art, and Culture. Translated by Attwood, Corinne. Reaktion Books. ISBN 978-1-86189-185-3.
- Sen, Amartya (2005). The Argumentative Indian. Allen Lane. ISBN 0-7139-9687-0.
- Sen, Sailendra (2013). A Textbook of Medieval Indian History. Primus Books. ISBN 978-93-80607-34-4.
- Sharma, Parvati (2023). A Lamp for the Dark World: Akbar, India's Greatest Mughal. Rowman & Littlefield Publishers. ISBN 978-1-5381-7790-7.
- Sharma, Sri Ram (1988). The Religious Policy of the Mughal Emperors. Munshiram Manoharlal Publishers. ISBN 81-215-0395-7.
- Smith, Vincent Arthur (1917). Akbar the Great Mogul, 1542–1605. Oxford at The Clarendon Press.
- Smith, Vincent A. (2002) [First published 1919]. The Oxford History of India. Oxford University Press. ISBN 978-0-19-561297-4.
- Somani, Ramavallabha (1990). History of Jaisalmer. Panchsheel Prakashan. ISBN 978-81-7056-070-8.
- Sreenivasan, Ramya (2006). "Drudges, dancing girls, concubines: female slaves in the Rajput polity, 1500–1850". In Indrani Chatterjee; Richard M. Eaton (eds.). Slavery and South Asian History. Indiana University Press. ISBN 0-253-11671-6. Archived from the original on 22 September 2023.
- Subrahmanyam, Sanjay (June 1994). "Book Reviews: Naimur Rahman Farooqi, Mughal-Ottoman Relations: A Study of the Political and Diplomatic Relations between Mughal India and the Ottoman Empire, 1556–1748, Delhi". The Indian Economic & Social History Review. 31 (2). doi:10.1177/001946469403100210. S2CID 143346476. Archived from the original on 29 November 2022.
- Syed, Jawad (2011). "Akbar's multiculturalism: lessons for diversity management in the 21st century". Canadian Journal of Administrative Sciences. 28 (4): 402–412. doi:10.1002/CJAS.185.
- Thackeray, Frank W.; Findling, John E. (2012). Events That Formed the Modern World. Vol. 1. ABC-CLIO. ISBN 978-1-59884-902-8.
- Truschke, Audrey (2012). "Setting the Record Wrong: A Sanskrit Vision of Mughal Conquests". South Asian History and Culture. 3 (3): 373–396. doi:10.1080/19472498.2012.693710. S2CID 145619920. Archived from the original on 7 March 2022.
- Waseem, Shah Mohammad (2003). A Persian historiography in India. Kanishka Publishers. ISBN 978-81-7391-537-6. Archived from the original on 18 March 2023.
- Wiegand, Wayne A.; Davis, Donald G., eds. (1994). "India". Encyclopedia of Library History. Garland Publishing, Incorporated. ISBN 0-8240-5787-2.

Akbar Timurid dynasty Born: 14 October 1542 Died: 27 October 1605
Regnal titles
Preceded by Humayun	Mughal Emperor; 1556–1605	Succeeded by Jahangir
