= Begum (name) =

Begum or Begüm is a female title, given name and surname. It comes from Turkic languages, it is formed by adding the suffix "-um", meaning "mine" to the word beg. It means "my lord, lady" and is used as the female equivalent of the word bey. It is also used in Mirza families/lineages.

== Historic title ==
Some examples of women with the title of Begum for example Nawabs of Bhopal or Begum of Bhopal.

Women with the title Begum include:

- Khanzada Begum (c. 1478 – 1545), a Timurid princess and the eldest daughter of Umar Shaikh Mirza II, the amir of Ferghana
- Maham Begum (died 1534), Empress Consort of Mughal Empire, third wife and chief consort of Babur, Queen Mother of Mughal Empire
- Aisha Sultan Begum, Empress consort of Ferghana Valley and Samarkand as the first wife of Emperor Babur
- Zainab Sultan Begum, Empress consort of Ferghana Valley and Kabul as the second wife of the first Emperor Babur.
- Masuma Sultan Begum (died 1509), Empress consort of Ferghana Valley and Samarkand as the fourth wife of Emperor Babur
- Gulbadan Begum (c. 1523 – 1603), Mughal princess and the youngest daughter of Emperor Babur
- Yakhan Begum (died 1602), a Karkiya princess, daughter of the last Karkiya ruler Khan Ahmad Khan (r. 1538–1592)
- Bega Begum (c. 1511 – 1582), Empress consort of the Mughal Empire and first and chief consort of the second Mughal emperor Humayun
- Hamida Banu Begum (c. 1527 – 1604), Empress Consort of the Mughal Empire as wife of emperor Humayun, Queen mother of Mughal Empire
- Mah Chuchak Begum (died 1564), wife of the second Mughal emperor Humayun
- Bakshi Banu Begum (1540–1596), Mughal princess and was the second daughter of Emperor Humayun
- Bakht-un-Nissa Begum (c. 1547 – 1608), a Mughal princess, the daughter of Mughal emperor Humayun
- Wali Nimat Mariam-uz-Zamani Begum (c. 1542 – 1623), Empress Consort, chief and favorite wife of Mughal Emperor Akbar (1562–1605) and Queen Mother of Mughal Empire
- Ruqaiya Sultan Begum (c. 1542 – 1626), first and chief wife of Mughal Emperor Akbar
- Salima Sultan Begum (c. 1538 – 1613), third wife and chief consort of Mughal emperor Akbar and Empress consort of Mughal Emperor Akbar
- Shakr-un-Nissa Begum (c. 1571 – 1653), Mughal princess, daughter of Mughal emperor Akbar
- Aram Banu Begum (c. 1584 – 1624), a Mughal princess, youngest daughter of Mughal Emperor Akbar
- Shah Begum (c. 1570 – 1604), first and chief wife of Prince Salim, future, Emperor Jahangir
- Nur-un-Nissa Begum, (1570-?), a Timurid princess, the daughter of Ibrahim Husain Mirza, wife of Mughal emperor Jahangir
- Saliha Banu Begum (died 1620), Empress consort of the Mughal Empire as the wife of Emperor Jahangir
- Hoshmand Banu Begum (1605-?), Mughal princess, granddaughter of Mughal emperor Jahangir and daughter of crowned prince Khusrau Mirza
- Bahar Banu Begum (1590–1653), Mughal princess, daughter of Mughal emperor Jahangir
- Kandahari Begum (1593-?), first wife of the Mughal emperor Shah Jahan
- Jahanara Begum (1614–1681), Mughal princess and the eldest daughter of Emperor Shah Jahan
- Roshanara Begum (1617–1671), Mughal princess and the second daughter of Mughal emperor Shah Jahan
- Gauhar Ara Begum (1631–1706), Mughal princess and the fourteenth and youngest child of the Mughal emperor Shah Jahan
- Nadira Banu Begum (1618–1659), Mughal princess and the wife of Crown prince Dara Shikoh
- Jahanzeb Banu Begum (died 1705), Mughal princess and the chief consort of Muhammad Azam Shah
- Badshah Begum (c. 1703 – 1789), Empress consort of the Mughal Empire as the first wife and chief consort of the Mughal emperor Muhammad Shah
- Ghaseti Begum, the eldest daughter of Alivardi Khan, Nawab of Bengal, Bihar, and Orissa during 1740–1758
- Begum Hazrat Mahal (c. 1820 – 1879), also called as Begum of Awadh, was the second wife of Nawab Wajid Ali Shah
- Lutfunnisa Begum (1740–1790), the second wife of Nawab Siraj ud-Daulah, the last independent Nawab of Bengal

Contemporary (20th-century title)

- Begum Om Habibeh Aga Khan (1906–2000), fourth and last wife of Sir Sultan Muhammad Shah, Aga Khan III
- Mah Parwar Begum (died 1941), Queen of Afghanistan

== Given name ==
=== Begum ===
- Begum Akhtar (1914–1974), Indian singer of Ghazal, Dadra, and Thumri genres of Hindustani classical music
- Begum Ishrat Ashraf, Pakistani politician
- Begum Tabassum Hasan (born 1979), Indian politician
- Begum Khurshid Mirza (1918–1989), Pakistani television actress and film actress
- Begum Para (1926–2008), Indian Hindi film actress
- Begum Rokeya (1880–1932), Bengali feminist thinker, writer, educationist
- Begum Khaleda Zia (1945-2025), Bangladeshi politician
- Begum Rosy Kabir (1950/51-2024), Bangladeshi politician
- Begum Samru (1753–1836), Indian politician
- Sharmila Tagore (also known as Begum Ayesha Sultana) (born 1944), Indian film actress

=== Begüm ===
- Begüm Birgören (born 1982), Turkish actress
- Begüm Dalgalar (born 1988), Turkish basketball player
- Begüm Doğan Faralyalı (born 1976), Turkish businesswoman who is the chairwoman of Doğan Holding.
- Begüm Kaçmaz (born 2007), Turkish volleyball player
- Begüm Kütük (born 1980), Turkish actress and model
- Begüm Pusat (born 2004), Turkish wheelchair basketball player
- Begüm Kübra Tokyay (born 1993), Turkish biomedical engineer, flag football player and official of American football
- Begüm Yuva (born 2006), Turkish archer

== Middle name ==
- Ayşe Begüm Onbaşı (born 2001), Turkish aerobic gymnast
- Rahil Begum Sherwani (1894–1982), founder of the All India Women's Muslim League
- Yasemin Begüm Dalgalar (born 1988), Turkish female basketball player

== Last name ==
- Ameena Begum (1892–1949), American Sufi
- Amena Begum (1925–1989), Bangladeshi politician
- Apsana Begum (born 1990), British Labour Party politician
- Bahar Begum (born c. 1942), Pakistani film actress
- Doly Begum (born 1989), Canadian politician
- Fatma Begum (1892–1983), Indian actor
- Fatima Begum (politician, born 1890) (1890–1958), respected woman of the Pakistan Movement
- Fatima Sughra Begum (1931/32-2017), Pakistani activist and figure in Pakistani politics
- Firoza Begum (singer) (1930–2014), Bangladeshi Nazrul Geeti singer
- Halima Begum, Bangladeshi-British charity executive
- Humaira Begum (1918–2002), last Afghanistan Queen consort
- Julaiha Begum (1948–2001), Singaporean murderer
- Maleka Begum (born 1944), Bangladeshi feminist, author, academic
- Mehnaz Begum (1958–2013), Pakistani singer
- Michael Begum (1988–2024), better known as BrolyLegs, professional video game player
- Momtaz Begum (born 1961), Bangladeshi folk singer
- Momtaz Begum-Hossain (born 1981), English journalist
- Mubarak Begum (1936–2016), Indian singer
- Mumtaz Begum (activist) (1923–1967), Bengali language activist
- Mumtaz Begum (actress) (1923–2002), Indian Bollywood actress
- Mumtaz Begum (politician) (born 1956), former mayor of Bangalore
- Mumtaz Begum Jehan Dehlavi (1933–1969), Indian film actress
- Munni Begum (born 1955), Urdu Pakistani ghazal singer
- Naseem Begum (1936–1971), Pakistani film playback singer
- Rehana Begum (born 1952), Indian artisan
- Ruqsana Begum (born 1983), English kickboxer and boxer
- Shamima Begum (born 1999), one of three British teenagers who married ISIS terrorists.
- Shamshad Begum (1919–2013), Indian "playback" singer
- Sharmeena Begum (born 1999), left the United Kingdom to join the ISIL in December 2014
- Zubeida Begum (1926–1952), Indian film actress

== See also ==
- Mirza
- Baig
- Khanum
- Begzadi, decedent of a Beg
