= Jana Begum =

17th century Mughal Indian noblewoman and scholar

- Died: Agra, Mughal Empire
- Spouse: Daniyal Mirza (m.1584)
- Issue: A son
- Dynasty: Qara Qoyunlu (by birth); Timurid (by marriage)
- Father: Abdul Rahim Khan-i-Khanan
- Mother: Mah Banu Begum

Jana Begum was a consort of Mughal prince Daniyal Mirza and a scholar, noted for being one of the first Indian Muslim women to write a commentary (tafsir) on the Qur'an in the 17th century.

== Life ==
Jana Begum was the daughter of Abdul Rahim Khan-i-Khanan, a scholar and general under Mughal Emperor Akbar. Her grandfather was Bairam Khan, another general under Mughal Emperors Humayun and Akbar. Bairam Khan had also served as Regent to Akbar.

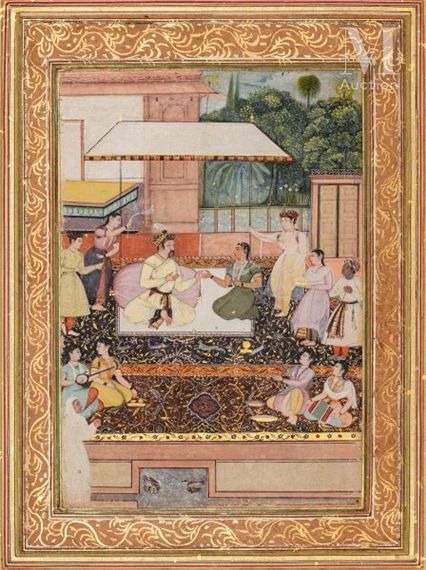
A 16th-century Mughal miniature depicting Prince Daniyal Mirza within the zenana (women's quarters).

Jana Begum later went on to marry Daniyal Mirza, a son of Akbar making her the Mughal Emperor's daughter-in-law. Akbar had also married Bairam Khan's widow Salima Sultan Begum hence Salima not only was step-grandmother to Jana, but also step-mother-in-law. Daniyal Mirza was known to be very attached to her and upon his death in 1605 she was inconsoleable. Records indicate that out of grief she burnt herself, wore cotton and mourned his passing deeply for the rest of her life.

Jana Begum was noted amongst contemporary women of the time period for proagationg Islam throughout the empire. It has also been noted that Jana Begum had inherited her father's zeal for knowledge and literature. She was rewarded by Akbar 5,000 dinars for writing her commentary on the Quran. Jana Begum also wrote a treatise on music. It was titled Risāla-i Mūsīqī and written in the early 17th century possibly during the lifetime of Shah Jahan. This work, written in Hindawi, and copied in Nastaliq in 1668 stands as the only known music treatise authored by a woman during the Mughal period.
