= Begun (surname) =

Begun is a surname. Notable people with the name include:

- Iosif Begun (born 1932), Soviet refusenik
- Semi Joseph Begun (1905–1995), German-American engineer and inventor
- Vladimir Begun (1929–1989), Soviet zionologist

== See also ==
- Biegun, a Polish cognate
- Begun
- Begum (name)
