= Akbar's Church =

Coordinates: 27.197342°N 78.010397°E

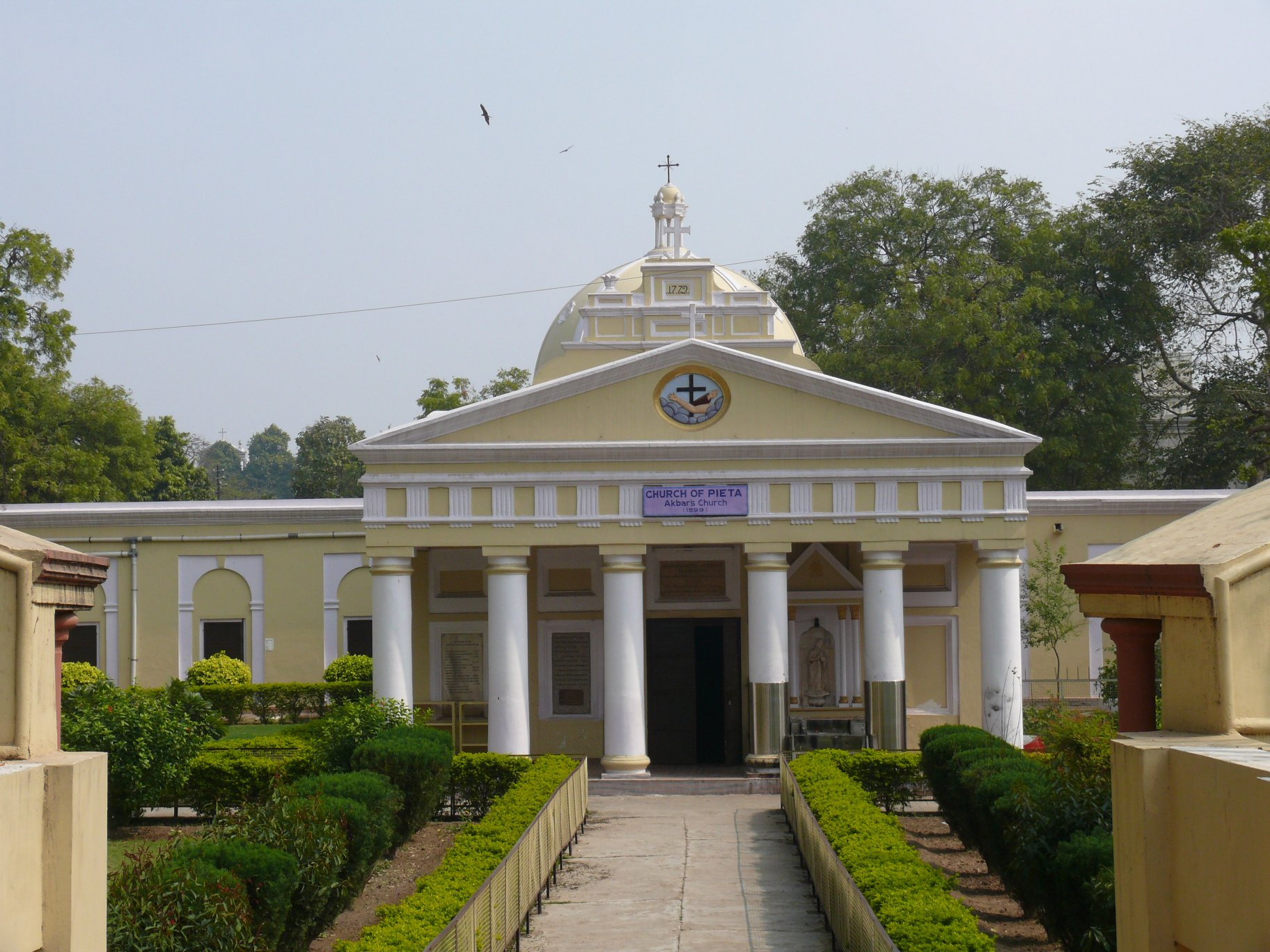
- Akbar's Church, Agra
- Akbar's Church
- Location: Kamla Nagar, Civil Lines, Agra, Uttar Pradesh 282003
- Country: India
- Denomination: Roman Catholic
- Website: www.agraarchdiocese.com

History
- Status: Catholic Church
- Founded: 1600; 426 years ago
- Founder: Society of Jesus

Architecture
- Functional status: Active

Administration
- Archdiocese: Roman Catholic Archdiocese of Agra
- Diocese: Diocese of Agra

Clergy
- Archbishop: Raphy Manjaly

Akbar's Church also known as Church of Akbar is a Roman Catholic Church, built in 1600 by Jesuit Fathers, situated in Agra, India.

== History ==
Mughal Emperor Akbar the Great invited Jesuit priests from Portuguese Goa so that he could learn more about Christianity. So, Father Rodolfe Aquauiua, the Father Anthony Monserrate and the Father Francois Henriques reached Agra on 18 February 1580. Akbar learnt about Christianity and gave land to Jesuit fathers to build a church in Agra. This was the first Roman Catholic Church in the Mughal Empire. After Akbar it was his son Jahangir who donated for further expansion of the Church. Khwaja Martins and Mirza Sikandar Junior too contributed for the expansion. The church was demolished by Emperor Shah Jahan in 1635, after he captured Jesuit Priests crossing religious limits of Islam and agreed to release them only if they demolish the Church. The Church was rebuilt in 1636 by the permission of Mughal Emperor Shah Jahan after the pardon of Jesuits.

First Holy Mass was celebrated in the Church on 8 September 1636. In 1761, in the aftermath of the Third Battle of Panipat the church was looted by Afghan Invaders under Ahmed Shah Abdali.

In 1769, the church was rebuilt by Father Wendel S.J. with the help of Walter Reinhardt, Commander of Agra Fort. Bishop Antonino Pezzoni, O.F.M. Cap. extended the church westward with the contribution from Jean Baptiste Filose in 1835.

== Historic events ==
- In 1610, three Royal Princes, nephews of Emperor Jahangir, Tahmuras (Don Felipe), Baisanghar (Don Carlos) and Hoshang (Don Henrique), having been catechized by Fr. Corsi, S.J., were baptized by Fr. Jerome Xavier S.J. in this Church.
- Begum Johana Sumroo, the Begum of Sardhana was baptized in this Church.
- Akbar's Church was the Cathedral of Agra until 1848.
- In 1842, Religious of Jesus and Mary from France were welcomed by Bishop Borghi in the same Church.
- In 1843, Bishop Borghi consecrated Msgr. Carli Bishop of Almira.
- In 1846, Servant of God Bishop Anastasius Hartmann was consecrated Vicar Apostolic of Patna.

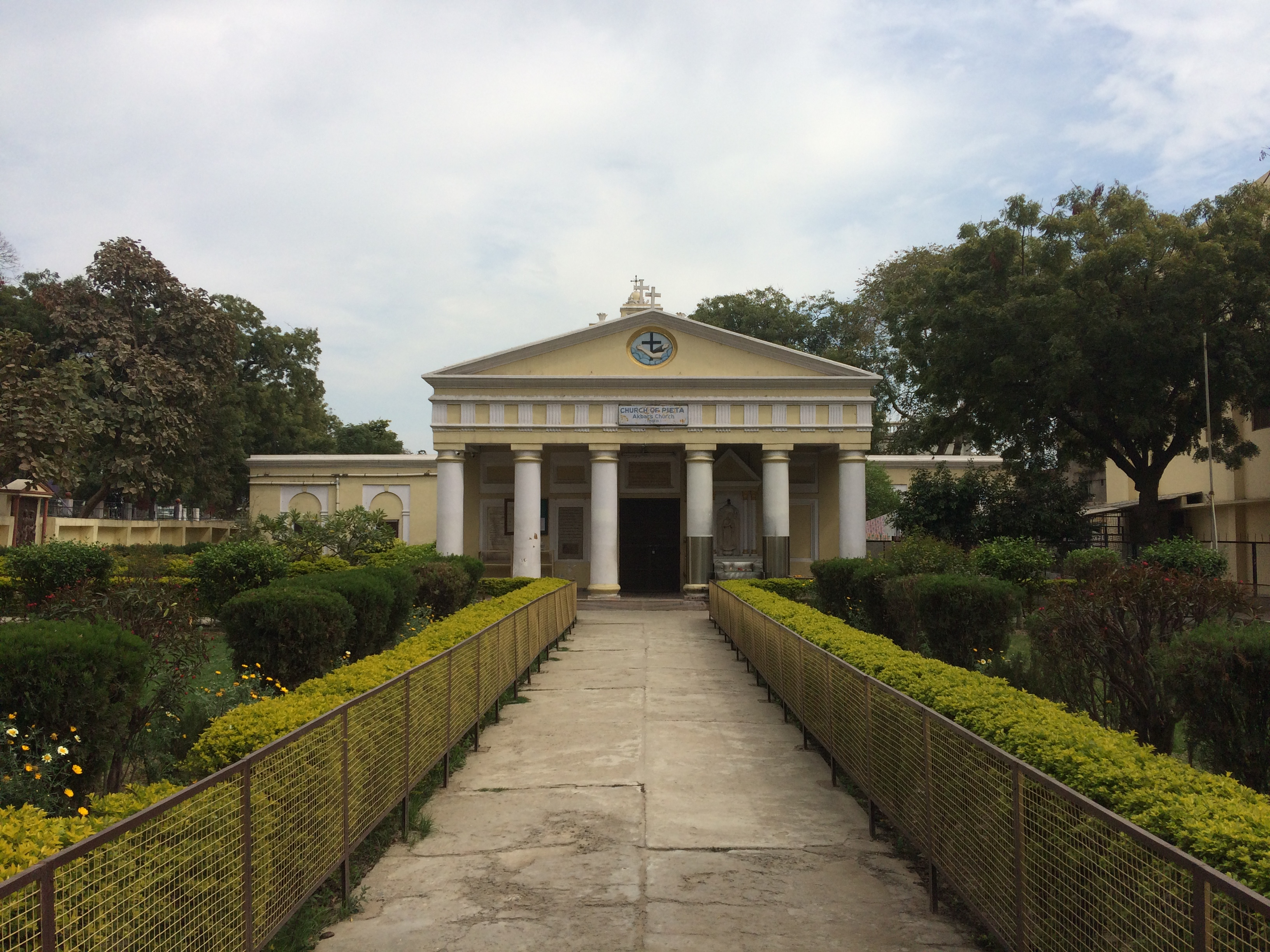
Church of Akbar

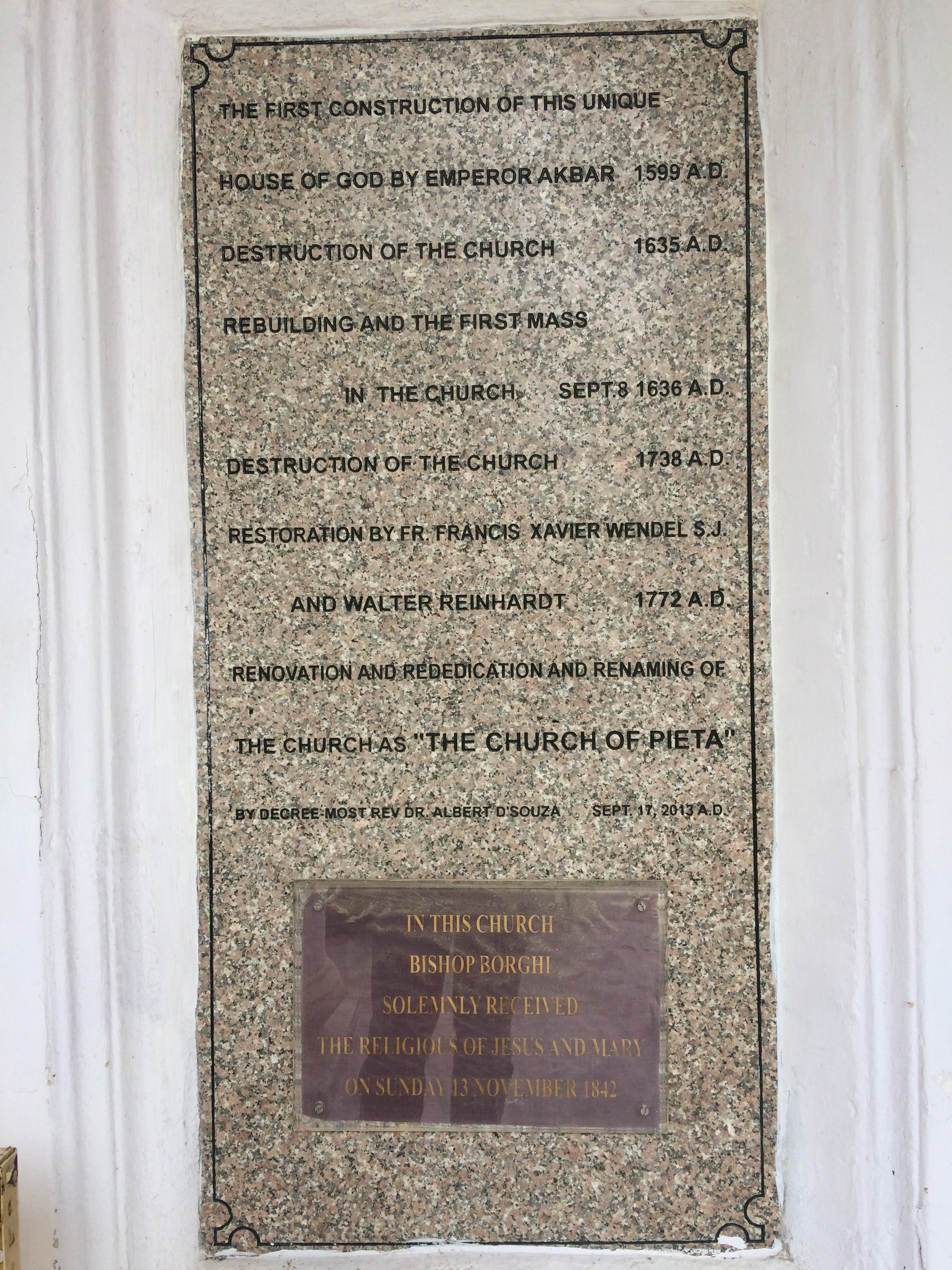
Inscription at the church showing the time in history that this church went through

== See also ==
- List of things named after Akbar the Great
- List of Jesuit sites
