= Bahar Banu Begum =

Shahzadi of Mughal Empire (1590–1653)

- Shahzadi of Mughal Empire
- Born: 9 October 1590; Lahore, Mughal Empire
- Died: 8 September 1653 (aged 62); Akbarabad (present day Agra), Mughal Empire
- Burial: Tomb of Mariam-uz-Zamani
- Spouse: Tahmuras Mirza (m. 1625; d. 1628)
- Father: Jahangir
- Mother: Karamsi Bai
- Religion: Sunni Islam

Bahar Banu Begum (Persian: بهار بانو بیگم; 9 October 1590 – 8 September 1653), meaning "spring lady", was a Mughal princess, the daughter of Mughal emperor Jahangir.

== Birth ==
Bahar Banu Begum was born on 9 October 1590, during the reign of her grandfather Emperor Akbar. Her mother was Karamsi Bai, the daughter of Raja Keshav Das of the Rathore family. On the same day, Jagat Gosain, the daughter of Udai Singh of Marwar, gave birth to another daughter named Begum Sultan Begum. She was the seventh child and fifth daughter born to her father, but the only child of her mother.

== Marriage ==
In 1625, Prince Tahmuras Mirza, the eldest son of Prince Daniyal Mirza, and the grandson of Akbar, paid homage at the court. Prior to this his younger brother Prince Hushang Mirza also attained the honour of paying homage. In order to honour them, Jahangir married Bahar Banu to Tahmuras, and Hoshmand Banu Begum, the daughter of Prince Khusrau Mirza, to Hoshang.

After the death of her father Jahangir on 28 October 1627, her youngest brother Prince Shahryar Mirza proclaimed himself the emperor. However, her nephew Dawar Bakhsh, the son of Khusrau Mirza, ascended the throne at Lahore. Shah Jahan ascended the throne on 19 January 1628, and on 23 January, he ordered the execution of Shahryar, Bahar Banu Begum's husband Tahmuras Mirza and his brother Hoshang Mirza, and Khusrau Mirza's sons Dawar Bakhsh, and Garshasp Mirza.

== Death ==
Bahar Banu Begum died at Agra on 8 September 1653 at the age of sixty-two, and was buried in the tomb of Mariam-uz-zamani, her grandmother by Shah Jahan.
