= Mir'at al-quds =

Persian-language work by the Jesuit missionary Father Jerome Xavier

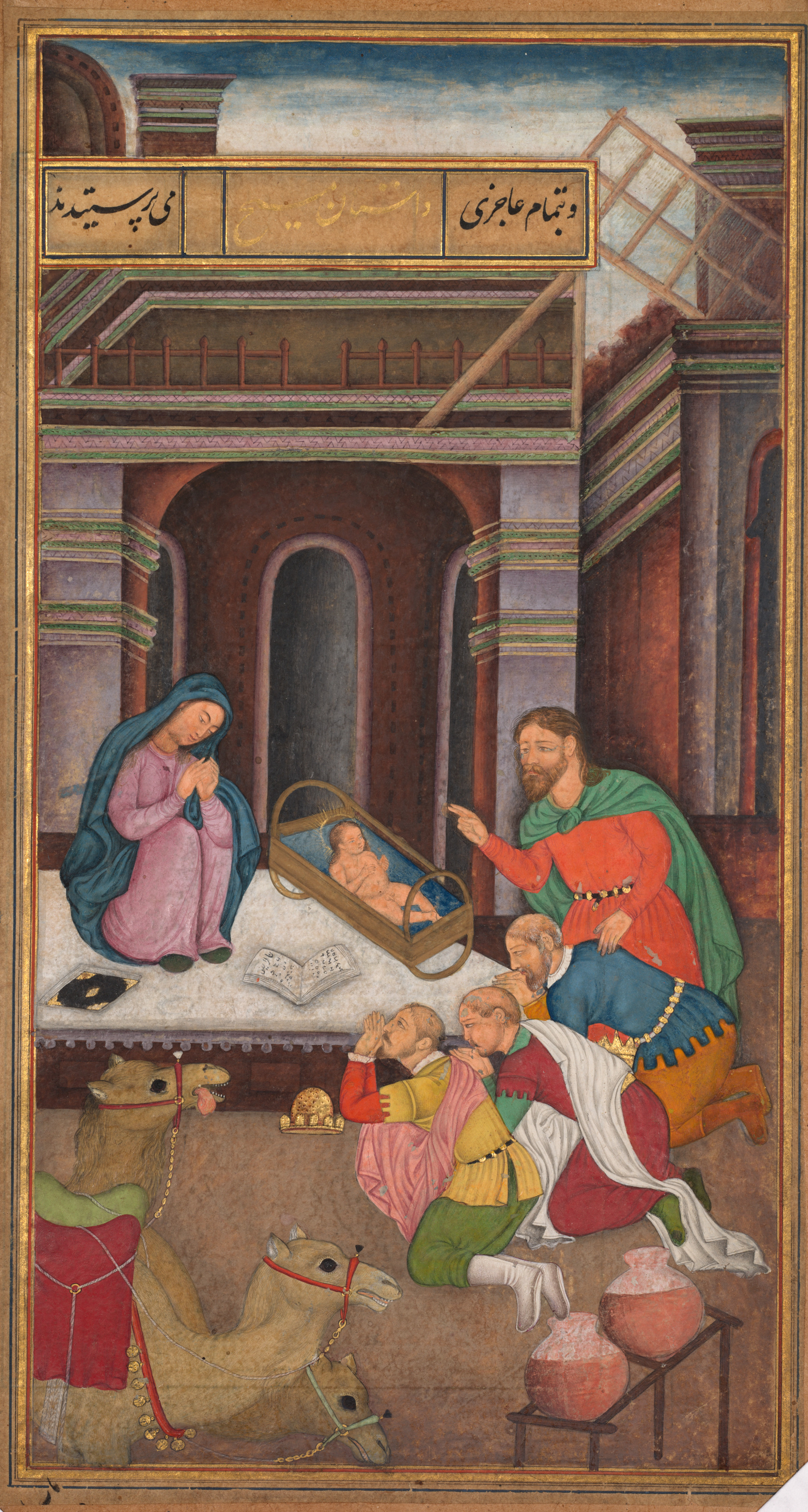
The Adoration of the Magi, from a Mirror of Holiness (Mir’at al-quds), Cleveland Museum of Art.

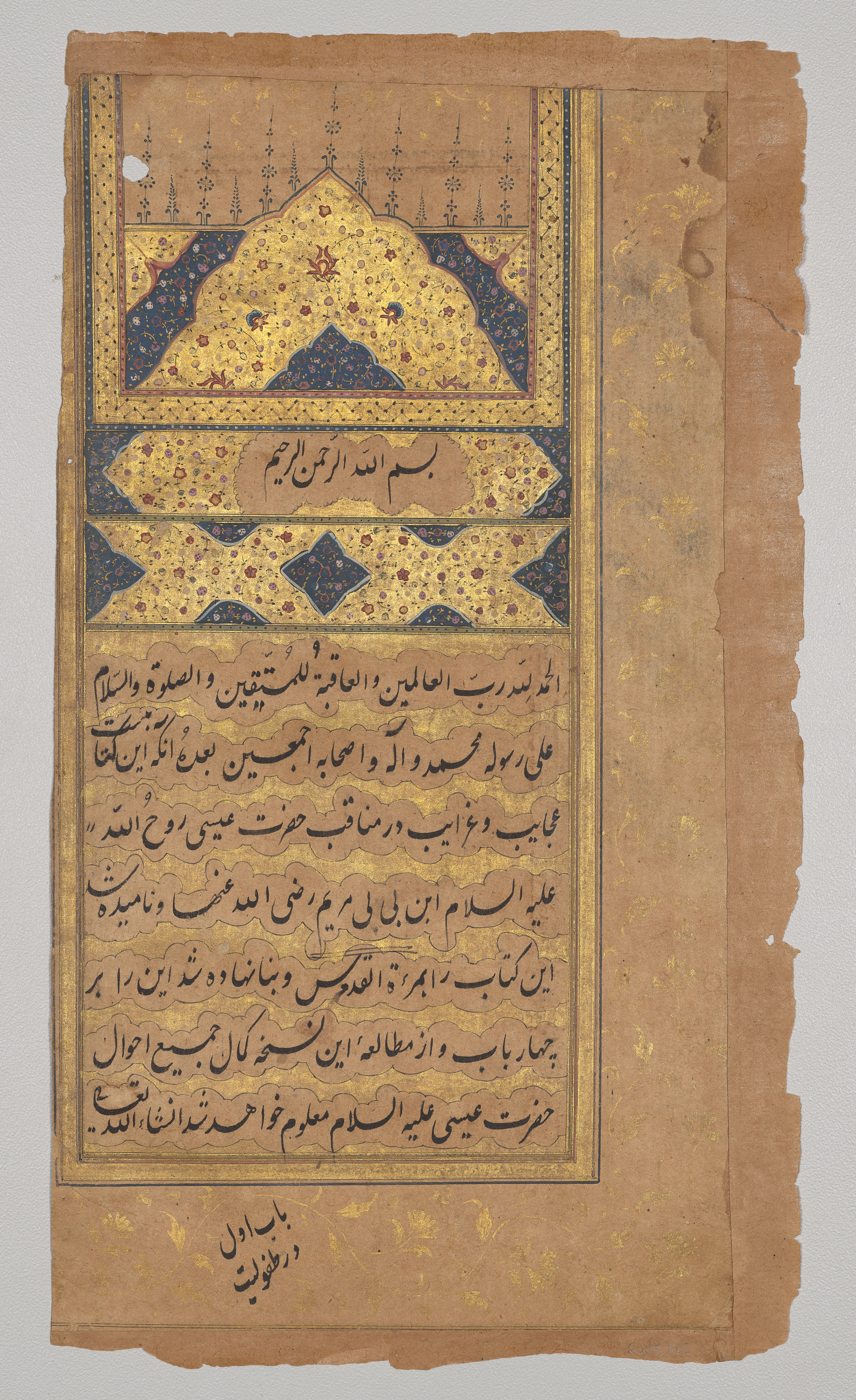
First page of the Mir'at.

Mir'at al-quds ya'ni dastan-i hazrat-i Isa ("Mirror of Holiness viz. the life of lord Jesus") is a Persian-language account of the life of Jesus, commissioned by the Mughal emperor Akbar and written by the Spanish missionary Jerome Xavier. It is known from several manuscripts, including three illuminated manuscripts.

== Backstory ==
Jerome Xavier was a Spanish Jesuit missionary who spent several years in Mughal India. He served at the courts of the emperors Akbar (r. 1556–1605) and Jahangir (r. 1605–1627). Akbar, known for his interest in world religions, had commissioned the Mir'at al-quds, and Xavier presented the manuscript to the emperor in 1602. Akbar cultivated an atmosphere of religious inclusivity, convening scholars and representatives of multiple faiths — among them Jesuit priests from Portuguese Goa — for theological discourse within the Ibadat Khana, his hall of religious debate and worship.

== Development of Mir'at al-quds ==
Xavier had studied Persian for several years, in order to work on the Mir'at. Being a non-native speaker of the language, his prose is described by Wheeler Thackston as "not highly literary", although understandable. Because of this, it is speculated that Xavier relied on the collaboration of Persian assistants to improve the language of the text, with the most notable contributor being Abdu’s Sattar ibn Qasim Lahuri. In the quotations of scripture, a word-for-word translation is used. Several Christian concepts (for instance, baptism) have no equivalent translation in Persian. For these words, their Arabic translations have been used.

The Mir'at highlights, and even exaggerates, various aspects which would be attractive to the Muslim audience, while downplaying some aspects that would be controversial. For instance, Friday is described as the day when several holy occasions occurred, including the births of Mary and John the Baptist. These claims do not correspond with historical or religious sources, but was likely added since the day is venerated by Muslims. Conversely, views regarding divorce have been omitted, since divorce is permissible in Islam. Jesus is also referred to by the epithet "Spirit of God", which is taken from the Quran. It is composed of only four chapters.

== Remaining Manuscript Copies ==
There are several known copies of the manuscript, three of which are illustrated. One is located in the Cleveland Museum of Art, the other in the Lahore Museum, and a third copy had its illustrations sold as folios in the art market. Twenty-seven illustrations have been identified as belonging to the Cleveland Mir'at, of which few survive on the copy in Cleveland, while some are in various European collections, and others have been lost. It is an incomplete copy. Another illustrated copy is situated in the Lahore Museum. It has recently been argued that the so-called “two royal copies,” likely the manuscripts now in Lahore and Cleveland, were produced within a Mughal royal context soon after Father Jerome Xavier presented the text to Akbar in 1602.
