= Hoshmand Banu Begum =

Princess of Mughal Empire

- Shahzadi of the Mughal Empire
- Born: c. 1605
- Spouse: Hushang Mirza (m. 1625; d. 1628)
- House: Timurid
- Father: Khusrau Mirza

Hoshmand Banu Begum (Persian: هوشمند بانو بیگم; born c. 1605), meaning "The Prudent Lady", was a Mughal princess, the daughter of Prince Khusrau Mirza, and the granddaughter of Mughal emperor Jahangir.

== Early life ==
Hoshmand Banu Begum was born in 1605. Jahangir noted in his memoirs that the astrologers told him that her birth would not be auspicious for her father but would be auspicious for him. Jahangir met her when she turned three, as the astrologers had augured.

== Marriage ==
In 1625, Prince Hushang Mirza, the second son of Prince Daniyal Mirza, and the grandson of Akbar, paid homage at the court. His elder brother Prince Tahmuras Mirza also attained the honour of paying homage. In order to honour them, Jahangir married Hoshmand Banu to Hushang, and Bahar Banu Begum, his own daughter to Tahmuras.

After the death of her grandfather Jahangir on 28 October 1627, her uncle Prince Shahryar Mirza proclaimed himself the emperor. However, her brother Dawar Bakhsh, ascended the throne at Lahore. Shah Jahan ascended the throne on 19 January 1628, and on 23 January, he ordered the execution of Shahryar, her husband Hushang Mirza and his brother Tahmuras Mirza, and her brothers Dawar Bakhsh, and Garshasp Mirza.

As a widow, Hoshmand Banu Begum lived into Shah Jahan's reign.
