= Hushang Mirza =

Hushang Mirza هوشنگ میرزا
- Shahzada of the Mughal Empire
- Born: March 1604; Burhanpur, Mughal Empire
- Died: 2 February 1628 (aged 23); Lahore, Mughal Empire
- Spouse: Hoshmand Banu Begum (m. 1625)
Names
- Shahzada Farhang Hushang Mirza
- House: Mughal dynasty
- Dynasty: Timurid dynasty
- Father: Daniyal Mirza
- Mother: Princess of Bhojpur
- Religion: Sunni Islam, Christianity

Hushang Mirza or Hoshang Mirza (Persian: هوشنگ میرزا; March 1604 – 2 February 1628) was a Mughal prince and grandson of the third Mughal emperor, Akbar. He was son of Daniyal Mirza and nephew of the fourth Mughal emperor, Jahangir.

== Birth and early years ==
Born at the beginning of 1012 AH or March 1604 CE, he was given the name Farhang Hushang by his paternal grandfather, Akbar. He was the youngest son of Daniyal Mirza and one of two children borne by his Hindu wife, a Paramara princess of Bhojpur (the other being a daughter, Mahi Banu Begum).

Though the exact circumstances of his parents' marriage are not recorded, it is known that his maternal grandfather, Raja Dalpat Ujjainia, had rebelled against Mughal authority in 1599. Daniyal Mirza, who at this point was the Subahdar of Allahabad, was dispatched to neutralise the rebellion. On the prince's arrival however, Dalpat quickly submitted and offered a tribute of elephants. It is believed that it was at this point that the Raja also gave his daughter in marriage to Daniyal. Dalpat however, was killed a few years later, supposedly on the orders of the then Prince Selim (who later became the Emperor Jahangir) as retribution for the death of a Mughal officer during his brief revolt.

Daniyal Mirza died of delirium tremens a little over a year after Hushang's birth, in April 1605, whilst acting as Subahdar of the Deccan. Akbar, who was deeply affected by his youngest son's death, himself expired in October of that year. Daniyal's family appears to have remained in his viceregal capital of Burhanpur following his death, as it was from here in 1606 that they were escorted to the Mughal court by Jahangir's physician, Muqarrab Khan. Jahangir recorded the arrival of his brother's children in his autobiography, the Tuzk-e-Jahangiri:

I saw Daniyal's children, whom Muqarrab Khan had brought; there were three sons and four daughters. The boys bore the names Tahmuras, Baysunghar, and Hushang. Such kindness and affection were shown by me to these children as no one thought possible. I resolved that Tahmuras, who was the eldest, should always be in waiting on me, and the others were handed over to the charge of my own sisters.

== Conversion to Christianity ==
By the start of Jahangir's reign, Jesuit missionaries had been present in India for several decades. Gradual progress had been made in their spreading of Christianity, to the point where there were small but ardent communities of converts in Agra and Lahore. There were even hopes that Jahangir himself might be converted, given that he had seemed friendlier to the missionaries than his father had been.

In July 1610, Jahangir summoned two Jesuit priests, Fathers Jerome Xavier and Emmanuel Pinheiro, to his court in Agra. There, before an assembly of his nobles, Jahangir entrusted Hushang and his two brothers to the Jesuits to be baptised and raised as Christians. The priests were reportedly overjoyed, falling to their knees and kissing the emperor's feet. Sir William Hawkins, a representative of the East India Company present at court, believed that Jahangir had only permitted the conversion to mitigate any support his nephews would have had among the Muslim nobles, which would have otherwise complicated his own progeny's succession to the throne. Alternatively, James I's ambassador to India, Sir Thomas Roe, claimed that they were done so that Jahangir would in turn be able to claim a Portuguese wife.

Nevertheless, after three months of preparation the princes were declared ready for baptism. Hushang, his elder brothers Tahmuras and Baysunghar, along with a fourth prince, a grandson of Akbar's brother Mirza Muhammad Hakim, went in a glittering procession through Agra, led by the Christians of the city from the fort to Akbar's Church. The princes rode on lavishly caparisoned elephants, dressed as Portuguese nobles with gold crosses hung around their necks. The church bells rang as they entered, holding candles and walking through clouds of frankincense. They repeated the vows of baptism said by the priest in Persian and had baptismal water sprinkled over their heads. Finally they were given Portuguese names, with Hushang being renamed Don Henrico. Tahmuras, Baysunghar and the fourth prince were given the names Don Philippe, Don Carlo and Don Duarte, respectively.

However, these conversions were only temporary. Four years later (presumably after Jahangir's succession fears were alleviated) the princes were returned to the Muslim fold, with the Jesuits bitterly remarking that they had "rejected the light and returned to their vomit".

== Under Shah Jahan's custody and marriage ==
In 1620, Hushang and his brother, Tahmuras, alongside Jahangir's blinded eldest son, Khusrau were committed to the charge of their cousin, Shah Jahan. However, in 1625 Hushang escaped Shah Jahan's custody while the latter prince was distracted by his rebellion against the emperor. Whilst Shah Jahan and his ally Malik Ambar were lifting a failed siege of Burhanpur, Hushang absconded to Rao Rattan of Bundi, before making his way to his uncle's court at Lahore.

Here Hushang, along with Tahmuras (who had arrived in similar circumstances) paid homage to Jahangir, who welcomed both and enrolled them into his household. Further to this, Jahangir honoured them by marrying each of the brothers to a Mughal princess, with Tahmuras marrying Jahangir's daughter, Bahar Banu Begum and Hushang, his granddaughter, Hoshmand Banu Begum.

== War of succession and execution ==
Jahangir died of illness in October 1627. His chief consort Nur Jahan immediately sent word to her favoured successor to the throne, Jahangir's youngest son (as well as her son-in-law), Shahryar Mirza. Shahryar proclaimed himself emperor at Lahore and seized the cities provincial treasury, distributing it to the army and nobility in order to gain their allegiance. Hushang, along with his brothers Tahmuras and Baysunghar all proclaimed their support of the prince, with Baysunghar being appointed Shahryar's Sultan Sipah Salar (commander-in-chief).

At the same time Asaf Khan, Nur Jahan's brother and father-in-law to Shah Jahan, sent word to the latter (who was still in the Deccan) of the emperor's death. To safeguard Shah Jahan's succession while he was making his way back from the Deccan, Asaf Khan named Dawar Bakhsh, son of the late Khusrau Mirza and brother-in-law to Hushang, as a stop-gap emperor. As Asaf Khan led his armies towards Lahore, Shahryar sent his troops under the command of Baysunghar across the Ravi River to meet them. However, Baysunghar's soldiers were unable to oppose them and were defeated after a single charge. Shahryar retreated to the citadel of Lahore, but was betrayed by his own men and brought before Dawar Bakhsh to do homage, before being blinded soon after. When Shah Jahan received word of the events at Lahore, he sent a command to Asaf Khan that his royal captives be executed:

To the effect that it would be well if Dawar Bakhsh the son, and (Shahriyar) the useless brother, of Khusrau, and the sons of Prince Daniyal, were all sent out of the world.

Shah Jahan sent an assassin named Raz Bahadur to carry out the executions. Hushang, Tahmuras, Shahriyar, Dawar and Dawar's younger brother Garshasp were beheaded on the night of the 2 February 1628 (Baysunghar's final fate was not mentioned). The heads were afterwards brought to Shah Jahan in Agra.

== Ancestry ==
Ancestors of Hushang Mirza

8. Nasir-ud-din Muhammad Humayun, Mughal Emperor
4. Jalal-ud-din Muhammad Akbar, Mughal Emperor
9. Hamida Banu Begum
2. Daniyal Mirza
1. Hushang Mirza
12. Mahipal Singh, Raja of Bhojpur
6. Dalpat, Raja of Bhojpur
13. Daughter of Virasinha Dev, Maharaja of Bandhogarh
3. Daughter
