= Biegun =

Biegun is a surname. Notable people with the surname include:

- Halina Biegun (born 1955), Polish luger
- Krzysztof Biegun (born 1994), Polish ski jumper
- Stefania Biegun (1935–2016), Polish cross-country skier
- Stephen E. Biegun (born 1963), American auto executive and politician

== See also ==
- Begun, an East Slavic cognate
