= Jerome Xavier =

Spanish jesuit missionery (1549–1617)

Jerome Xavier, born Jerónimo de Ezpeleta y Goñi (1549 – 27 June 1617), was a Spanish Jesuit missionary to the Mughal court of Akbar (1542–1605) and his son Jahangir. A grand-nephew of Saint Francis Xavier, he chose to be called Jerome Xavier.

Coat of Arms of Beire, Navarra with the Christian symbol of the Eucharist and the chains broken by Geant King Sancho VII of Navarre at the Battle of Las Navas de Tolosa, known in Arab history as the Battle of Al-Uqab, July 1212

== Early life ==
Jerome Xavier was born "in the castle of his father Miguel de Ezpeleta" in the northern province of Navarre, Spain, in 1549. Xavier's great-uncle, Saint Francis Xavier, was a close friend of Ignatius of Loyola and co-founder of the Society of Jesus.

On 7 May 1568, at the age of nineteen, upon completion of a degree of Bachelor of Philosophy from the University of Alcalá, Jerome entered the Society of Jesus. He spent the following years studying philosophy and theology before being ordained priest in 1575. After ordination he spent a number of years teaching "elementary subjects" in Villarejo de Fuentes in Cuenca, Spain, before being sent east, arriving in Goa in September 1581.

== Missionary work ==
=== First years ===
Upon arrival in Portuguese Goa Father Jerome was "appointed as master of novices", but quickly had to relinquish the position due to illness "as a consequence of the difficult sea-voyage and the troubles of acclimatization". Following his recovery Xavier began work on a Portuguese translation of Father Alessandro Valignano's History of the Jesuits in India.

In early 1584 Xavier was installed as the Rector of the Bassein College, though poor health hampered his duty once again and forced his transfer to the "more favorable climate" of Cochin, where he occupied the same position from 1586 to 1592. Around this time he was appointed Superior of the Professed House of Goa, though election to his new position further strained tense relations between the Portuguese and Spanish in the Oriental colony. The tension of a Castilian ruling a Portuguese population was eased when Mughal Emperor Akbar (1542–1605) called for the third mission of Jesuit priests to his court and Father Jerome was sent, by popular election, to Lahore where he arrived on 5 May 1595.

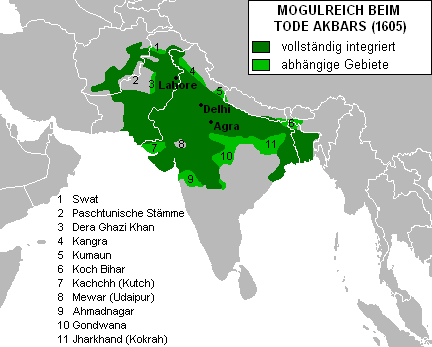
The Mughal Empire at Akbar's death in 1605. Fully integrated territories in dark green, dependent territories in light green

=== In the court of Akbar ===
Father Jerome's arrival in Lahore was marked by the hospitality of Akbar who provided him and his two companions, Father Emmanuel Pinheiro and Brother Bento de Góis, with lodgings in his own palace and "assigned a Muslim doctor to instruct them in learning the Persian language".

During the reign of Akbar, Father Jerome accompanied the Emperor on various expeditions through the Deccan Plateau, witnessing the capture of the fortress of Asirgarh in January 1601.

During the conquest Akbar moved his permanent residence to Agra, providing stability that allowed Father Jerome to "devote much of his time to the creation of a Christian religious literature written in the Persian tongue".

It was around this time that more Jesuit missionaries began to arrive to replace Father Emmanuel and Brother Bento who had been sent to explore the central route leading to China (the search of Cathay), and that the greatest accomplishment of Father Jerome and the Jesuits under Emperor Akbar was achieved.

While Xavier was accompanying the army, and with his two original companions sent elsewhere, he was notified by Father Francesco Corsi (1573–1635) of the declining atmosphere of religious freedom in Lahore under the "intolerant attitude of the Viceroy" put in place by Akbar. Immediately Father Jerome requested that the Emperor send the more experienced Father Pinheiro back to Lahore and issue a farmān "granting freedom of worship" to the Christians. This is significant largely because Akbar had denied previous requests by the missionaries to "strengthen the position of the mission" in an authoritative way within the Islamic Empire.

Xavier and the Emperor often debated topics regarding religion, most frequently Akbar's disbelief in the divinity of Christ. While the conversion of the Emperor seemed unlikely, Xavier "entertained great hopes" for his son Salīm, born 1569, who was called Salim as a sign of respect towards Sheikh Sufi Mystic Salim Chishti (1478–1572) whose daughter nursed Salim as a child – descendants of the famous Khawaja Moinuddin Chishti (1141–1230) whose tomb/Dargha is in Ajmer, Rajasthan.

=== In the court of Jahāngīr ===
Prince Salīm took the name Jahangir when he took the throne. His father's attitude towards Christian missionaries and discussion of religion within his court continued. Low conversion rates continued though "Xavier attended ... audiences [at Lahore] throwing the hook into the water, hoping the fish will bite". The most notable of all baptisms during Father Jerome's charge of the mission was that of the three nephews of Jahangir in the summer of 1610.

These conversions were short lived as in 1613 "the princes apostatized and gave their crucifixes [given to them upon their baptism] back to the Jesuits". This act confirmed Father Jerome's growing pessimism about his mission, due to the "hardness of the Muslims and...motives of the convert". His doubts of the effectiveness of his mission were further confirmed as war broke out between the Portuguese and Mughal Empires in the autumn of 1613.

During the conflict Xavier had to protect the possessions of the church by storing them "in the home of a poor Christian". As the war progressed safety became a concern for Father Jerome, who moved the Mission and its congregation from Lahore to Agra in 1614. While the "end of the mission seemed evident" peace was restored in 1615 and the mission resumed its pre-war activity, though without Father Jerome who for the first time since his departure returned to Goa, "a broken man".

== Final years and death ==
The final years of Father Jerome's life were spent in retirement in Goa. He was once again assigned as Rector, this time at Saint Paul's College. He desired greatly to return to Spain, though he did not possess the "health and strength required for the labours of that country". He reflected that he was "on death's door" and on 27 June 1617, "he was found burned to death in his room" under circumstances that are not known to this day. Unknown to him at the time of his death, Father Xavier had been elected to serve as the Archbishop of Cranganore.

== Sources ==
- Sir Edward Maclagan, KCSI, KCIE, The Jesuits and the Great Mogul, Ed. Burns, Oates & Washbourne, London, (1932), 433 pages, ISBN, 9780374952485. Reprint by Octagon Press, New York, (1972),
- Charles E. O'Neill, Joaquín María Domínguez, Diccionario histórico de la Compañía de Jesús: biográfico-temático, Volumen 4 Institutum Historicum, (2001) - 4110 pages. Univ. Pontificia de Comillas, ISBN 84-8468-036-3, ISBN 978-84-8468-036-9
- Fernão Guerreiro. Jahangir and the Jesuits. London: Routledge Curzon, (2005). ISBN 0-415-34482-4 DDC: 266.25409031. Facsimile reproduction of Jahangir and the Jesuits with an account of the travels of Bento de Gois and the mission to Pegu, from the Relations of Fernão Guerreiro, translated by C. H. Payne. London: George Routledge & Sons, (1930).
- Youri Martini, Akbar e i Gesuiti. Missionari cristiani alla corte del Gran Moghul, Il Pozzo di Giacobbe, Trapani 2018, ISBN 978-8861246911

== Footnotes ==
=== References ===
- Camps, Arnulf (1957). Jerome Xavier S.J. and the Muslims of the Mogul Empire: Controversial Works and Missionary Activity. Switzerland: Nouvelle Revue de Science Missionaire.

=== External links ===
Media related to Jerome Xavier at Wikimedia Commons
