= Abdul Rahim Khan-i-Khanan =

Mughal court poet and minister (1556–1627)

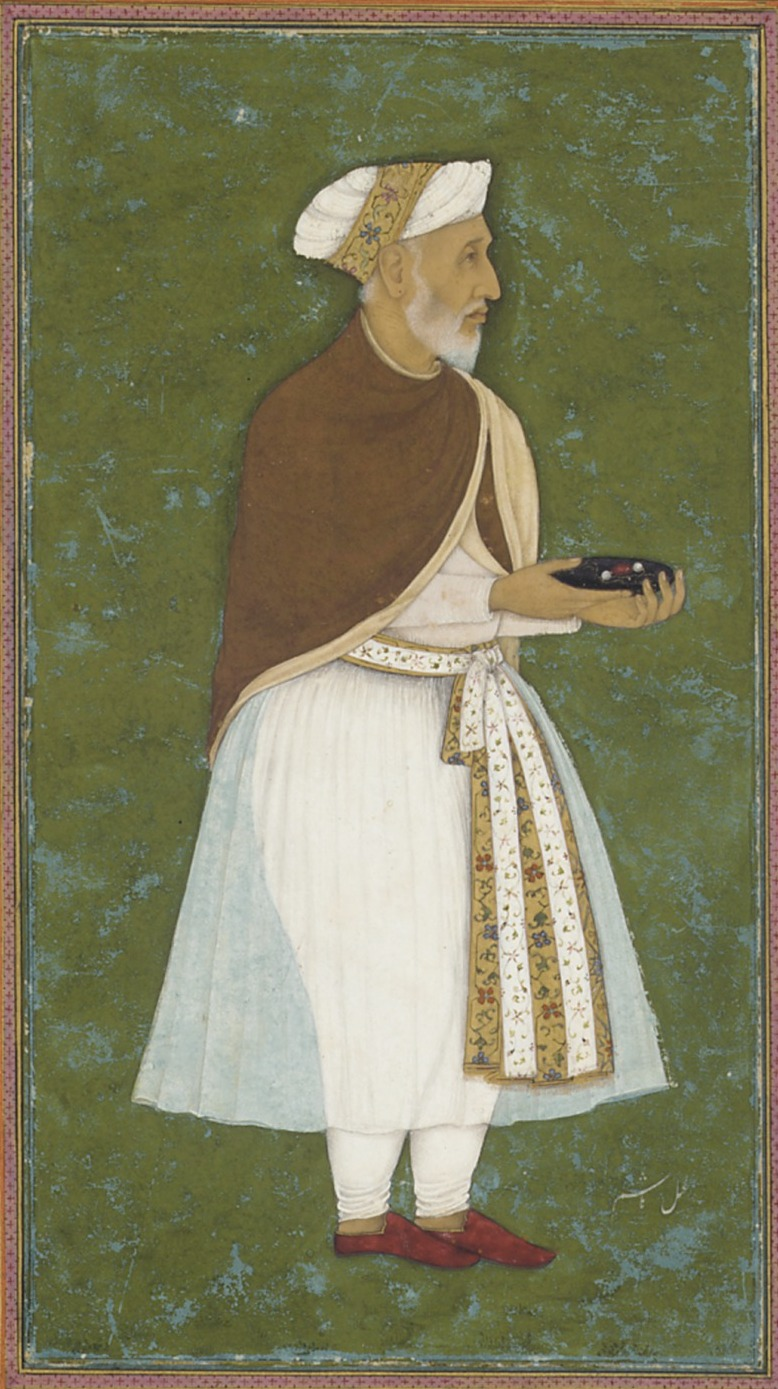
- Portrait of Abdul Rahim by Hashim, c. 1627
- Born: 17 December 1556; Lahore, Mughal Empire
- Died: 1 October 1627 (aged 70); Agra, Agra Subah, Mughal Empire
- Resting place: Tomb of Abdul Rahim Khan-i-Khanan, Delhi
- Title: iuybi-Khanan
- Children: Jana Begum; Shahnawaz Khan; Darab Khan; Mirza Rahmandad; Mirza Amrullah
- Parents: Bairam Khan (father); Daughter of Jamal Khan (mother)

Khanzada Mirza Khan Abdul Rahim (17 December 1556 – 1 October 1627), popularly known as simply Rahim and titled Khan-i-Khanan, was a poet who lived in India during the rule of Mughal emperor Akbar, who was Rahim's mentor. He was one of the nine important ministers (dewan) in Akbar's court, known as the Navaratnas. Rahim was known for his Hindustani dohe (couplets) and his books on astrology.

== Biography ==
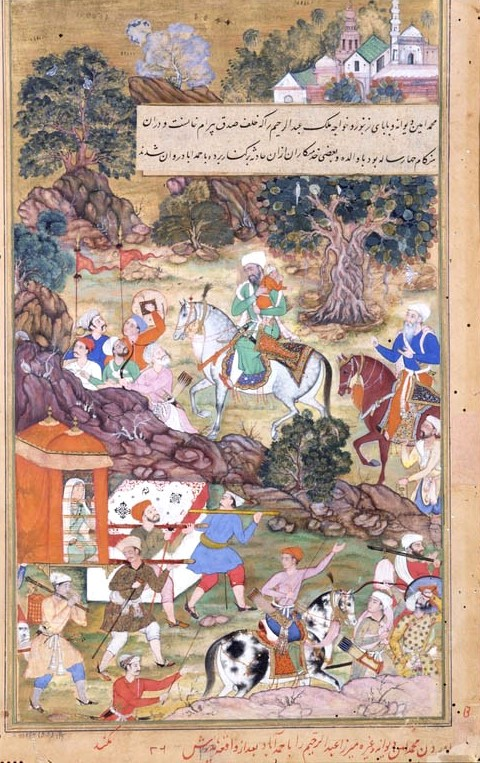
Bairam Khan's widow and child (Rahim) being escorted to Ahmedabad, in 1561, after his assassination, Akbarnama

Abdul Rahim was born in Lahore, the son of Bairam Khan, Akbar's trusted guardian and mentor, who was of Kara Koyunlu Turkic extraction. When Humayun returned to India from his exile, he asked his nobles to forge matrimonial alliances with various zamindars and feudal lords across the nation. Humayun married the elder daughter of Khanzada Jamal Khan of Mewat (now the Nuh district of Haryana) and he asked Bairam Khan to marry the younger daughter.

The Gazetteer of Ulwur (Alwar) states:

After Babur's death, his successor, Humayun, in 1540 was supplanted as ruler by the Pashtun Sher Shah Suri, who, in 1545, was followed by Islam Shah. During the reign of the latter, a battle was fought and lost by the emperor's troops at Firozpur Jhirka, in Mewat. However, Islam Shah did not lose his hold on power. Adil Shah, the third of the Pathan interlopers, who succeeded Islam Shah in 1552, had to contend for the empire with Humayun.

In these struggles for the restoration of Babur's dynasty the Khanzadas apparently do not figure at all. Humayun seems to have conciliated them by marrying the elder daughter of Khanzada Jamal Khan, nephew of Babur's opponent, Khanzada Hasan Khan Mewati, and by requiring his minister, Bairam Khan, to marry the younger daughter of the same Mewati.

The Khanzadas, the royal family of Muslim Jadon (also spelt as Jadaun) Rajputs, converted to Islam after Islamic conquest of northern India. Khanzada is the Persian form of the Indic word 'Rajput'. They were the Mewati chiefs of the Persian historians, who were the representatives of the lords of Mewat State.

Khanzada, or "the son of a Khan" is precisely the Musalman equivalent to the Hindu Rajput or "son of a Raja " ...

— From Punjab Castes by Denzil Ibbetson

After Bairam Khan was murdered in Patan, Gujarat, his first wife and young Rahim were brought safely from Ahmedabad to Delhi and presented at the royal court of Akbar, who gave him the title of 'Mirza Khan', and subsequently married him to Mah Banu (Moon Lady), sister of Mirza Aziz Kokah, son of Ataga Khan, a noted Mughal noble.

Later, Bairam Khan's second wife, Salima Sultan Begum (Rahim's stepmother) married her cousin, Akbar, which made Abdul Rahim Khan-i-Khan also his stepson, and later he became one of his nine prominent ministers, the Navaratnas, or nine gems. Aside from being a poet, Rahim Khan was also a general and was sent to deal with the rebellions in Gujarat and later served as the overall commander in the campaigns in Maharashtra.

He received the position and title of Khan-i-Khanan (Generalissimus, Persian خان خانان, DMG khān-i khānān, meaning "Khan of Khans").

Abdul Rahim was known for his peculiarly humble manner when giving alms to the poor. He never looked at the person he was giving alms to, keeping his gaze downwards in all humility. When Tulsidas heard about Rahim's behaviour when giving alms, he promptly wrote a couplet and sent it to Rahim:-

"ऐसी देनी देंन ज्यूँ, कित सीखे हो सैन
ज्यों ज्यों कर ऊंच्यो करो, त्यों त्यों निचे नैन"

"Why give alms like this? Where did you learn that? Your hands are as high as your eyes are low"

Realising that Tulsidas was well aware of the reasons behind his actions, and was merely giving him an opportunity to say a few lines in reply, he wrote to Tulsidas saying:-

"देनहार कोई और है, भेजत जो दिन रैन
लोग भरम हम पर करे, तासो निचे नैन"

"The Giver is someone else, giving day and night. But the world gives me the credit, so I lower my eyes."

He was considered a Persophile.

== Campaign against Mewar ==
In 1580, Rahim was appointed as the chief of Ajmer by Akbar. Around the same time, Akbar appointed him to lead another campaign against Maharana Pratap in order to capture or kill him. Rahim placed his family in Sherpura and advanced against Mewar. Pratap took up a position on the hilly pass of Dholan to check the Mughal advance. Meanwhile, his son Prince Amar Singh invaded Sherpura and succeeded in capturing the women of Rahim's family and brought them to Mewar. However, Pratap rebuked his son for capturing the women and ordered him to return them back with honor to Rahim.

== Major works ==
Apart from writing various dohas, Rahim translated Babar's memoirs, Baburnama, from the Chagatai language to the Persian language, which was completed in 1589–90. He had an excellent command of the Sanskrit language.

In Sanskrit, he wrote two books on astrology, Khetakautukam (Devanagari: खेटकौतुकम्) and Dwatrimshadyogavali (Devanagari: द्वात्रिंशद्योगावली).

== Tomb ==
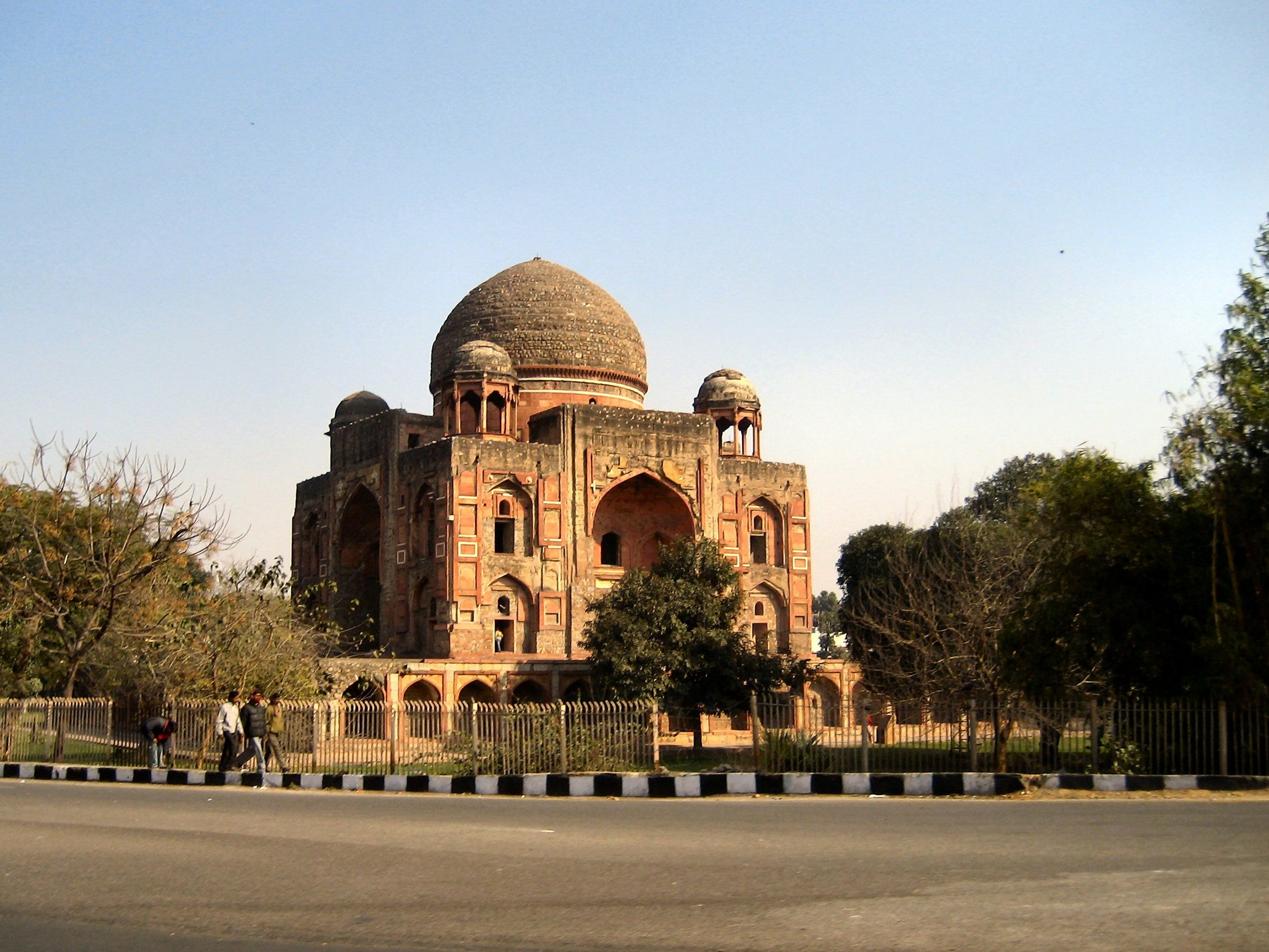
The tomb of Rahim in Nizamuddin East, Delhi, India

His tomb is situated in Nizamuddin East on the Mathura road, near Humayun's Tomb, in New Delhi. He built it for his wife in 1598, and his body was placed in it in 1627. In 1753–54, marble and sandstone from this tomb was used in the construction of Safdarjung's Tomb, also in New Delhi.

In 2014, the InterGlobe Foundation and the Aga Khan Trust for Culture announced a project to conserve and restore Abdul Rahim Khan-i-Khanan's tomb.

The tomb sits prominently along the Mathura Road, formerly the Mughal Grand Trunk Road, and lies close to the Dargah of Nizamuddin Auliya and Humayun's Tomb. In 2020, after six years of restoration work by the Aga Khan Trust for Culture, Rahim Khan's tomb was opened to the public. It is one of the largest conservation projects ever undertaken on any monument of national importance in India. For its architecture and purpose, it has often been compared with Taj Mahal.

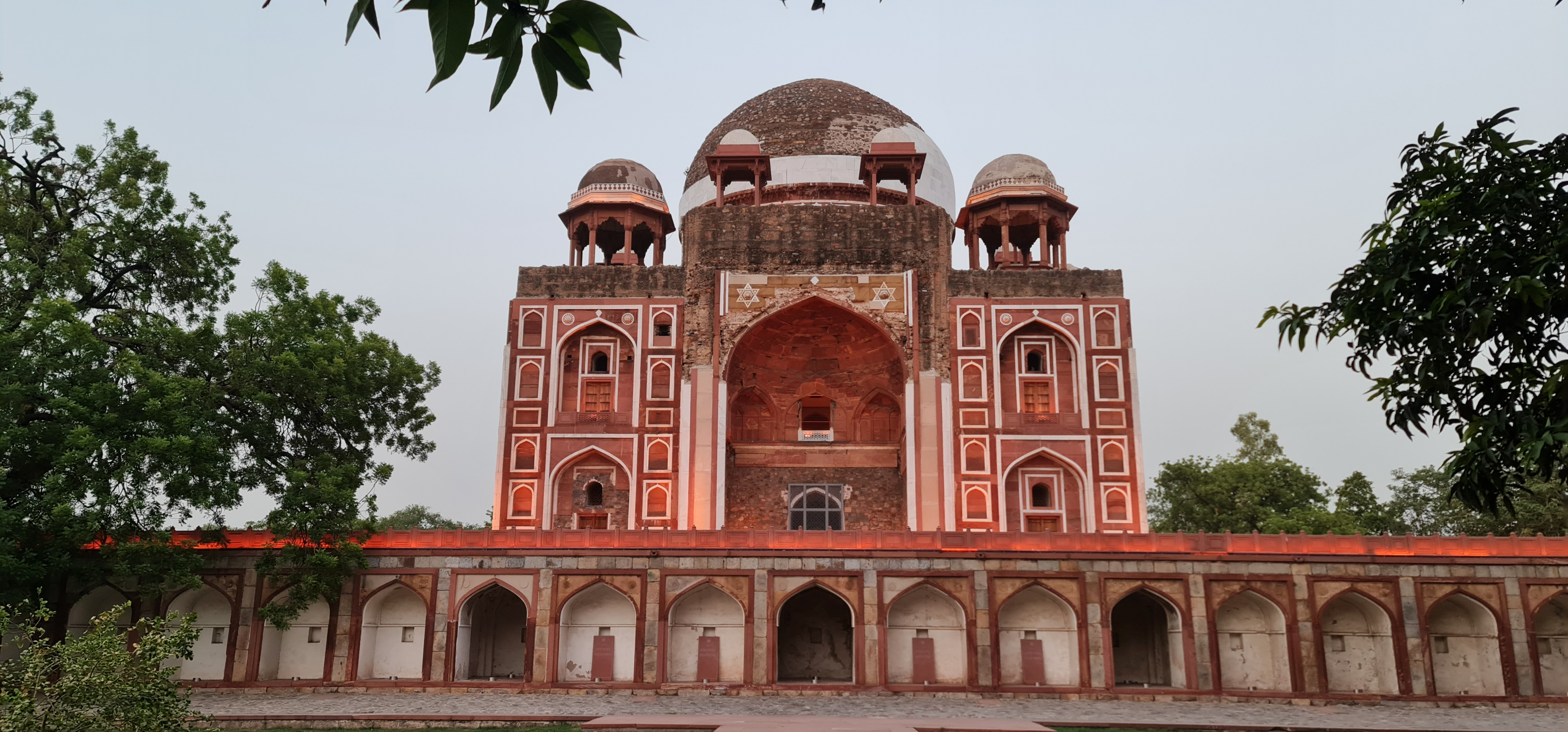
Mausoleum of Abdul Rahim Khan-i-Khanan

== Popular culture ==
=== Films and television ===
- In the 2014 historical drama series Siyaasat aired on The EPIC Channel, he is portrayed by Nagesh Salwan.
