= Beire =

Municipality in Navarre, Spain

Coordinates: 42°27′N 1°37′W

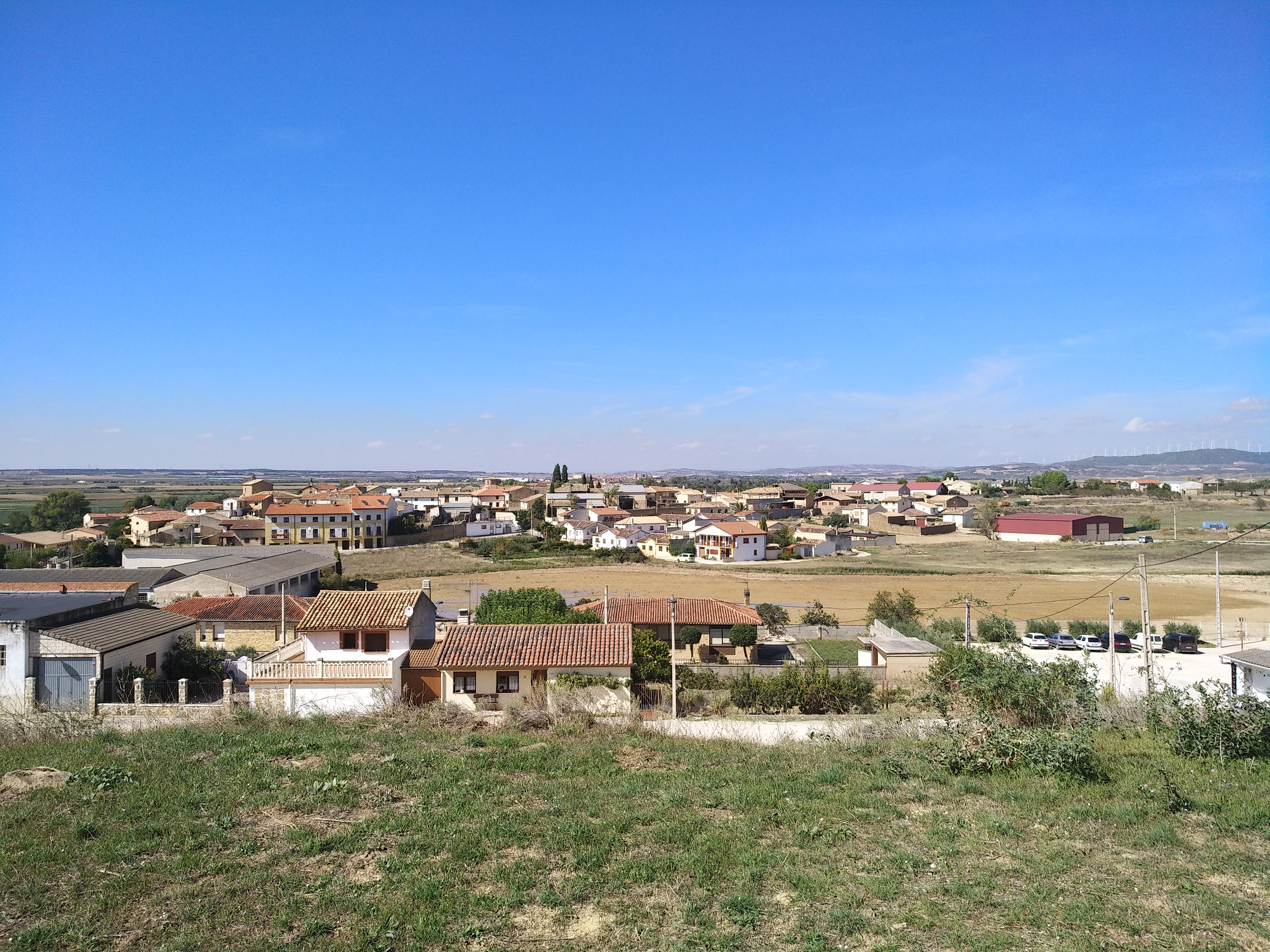
General View of Beire

Beire's flag

Beire's coat of arms

Beire is a town and municipality located in the province and autonomous community of Navarre, northern Spain.
