= Begum Rosy Kabir =

Bangladeshi politician (1951 – 2024)

- বেগম রোজী কবির

Member of Bangladesh Parliament
- In office 2005–2006

Personal details
- Born: 1950 or 1951; East Bengal, Pakistan
- Died: 13 November 2024 (aged 74); Dhaka, Bangladesh
- Political party: Bangladesh Nationalist Party

Begum Rosy Kabir (born 1950 or 1951; died 13 November 2024) was a Bangladesh Nationalist Party politician and a former member of the Bangladesh Parliament from a reserved seat.

== Life and career ==
Kabir was elected to parliament from reserved seat as a Bangladesh Nationalist Party candidate in 2005.

Kabir died on 13 November 2024, at the age of 73. She had been ill with liver-related problems for quite a while.
