= Salima Sultan Begum =

Empress consort of Mughal Emperor Akbar (1539–1613)

- Empress consort of the Mughal Empire
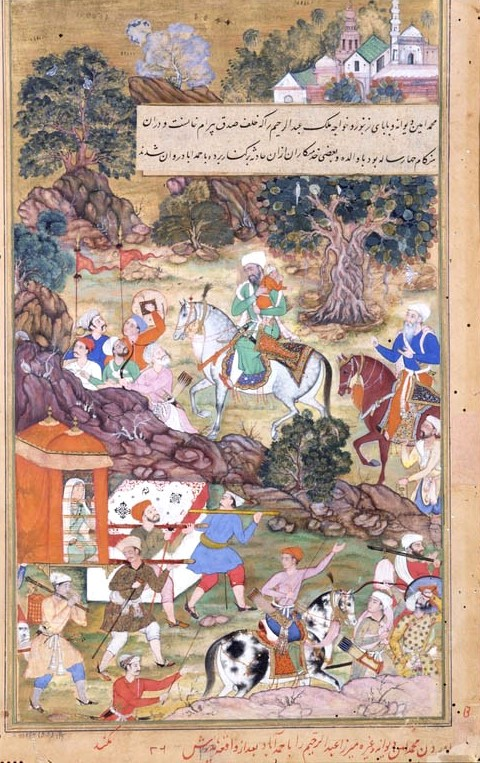
- Salima Begum and Abdul Rahim being escorted to Ahmedabad after Bairam Khan's assassination in 1561
- Born: 23 February 1539
- Died: 2 January 1613 (aged 73); Agra, Mughal Empire
- Burial: Mandarkar Garden, Agra
- Spouse: Bairam Khan (m. 1557; d. 1561); Akbar (m. 1561; d. 1605)
- House: Timurid (by marriage)
- Father: Nuruddin Muhammad Mirza of Naqshbandi Khawajas
- Mother: Gulrukh Begum
- Religion: Islam

Salima Sultan Begum (23 February 1539 – 2 January 1613) was the fourth wife of the Mughal emperor Akbar, a granddaughter of Babur, and a senior Mughal consort who was influential in the Mughal court during the reigns of Akbar and Jahangir.

Salima was the daughter of Akbar's paternal aunt, Gulrukh Begum, and her husband, the Viceroy of Kannauj, Nuruddin Muhammad Mirza. She was initially betrothed to Akbar's regent, Bairam Khan, by her maternal uncle, Humayun. The bride was probably a reward for the surpassing services done by Bairam for Humayun. The couple, who had a considerable age difference of approximately forty years, were married in 1557 after Akbar had succeeded Humayun as the third Mughal emperor. However, this brief union, which did not produce any children, lasted for only three years before Bairam Khan was assassinated by a band of Afghans in 1561. After his death, Salima was married to her first cousin, Akbar. She remained childless in both her marriages, but she raised the second son of Akbar, Murad Mirza, for the first few years.

Salima was a senior-ranking wife of Akbar and had much influence over her husband and his son, Jahangir. She wielded major political influence in the Mughal court during her husband's reign as well as during his successor's (Jahangir) reign. Her name, however, appears in the histories as a reader and poet who wrote under the pseudonym of Makhfi (lit. 'Hidden One') and as pleading with Akbar for Jahangir's forgiveness.

== Family and lineage ==
Family of Akbar and Salima Sultan Begum

Babur
Hamida Banu Begum | Humayun | Gulrukh Begum | Nur-ud-din Muhammad Mirza
Akbar | Salima Sultan Begum

Salima Sultan Begum was the daughter of Mughal princess Gulrukh Begum and her husband, the Viceroy of Kannauj, Nuruddin Muhammad Mirza. Her father was the grandson of Khwaja Hasan Naqshbandi and was a scion of the illustrious Naqshbandi Khwajas, who were held in great esteem and were related to Sultan Abu Sa'id Mirza of the Timurid Empire through his son, Sultan Mahmud Mirza.

Salima's mother, Gulrukh Begum, was the daughter of the first Mughal emperor Babur. The identity of the mother of Gulrukh Begum is disputed. In some sources her mother's name is mentioned as Saliha Sultan Begum. However, this name is not mentioned in the Baburnama written by Babur himself or the Humayun-Nama written by Gulbadan Begum, and therefore the existence of such a woman is questionable. She may also have been the daughter of Dildar Begum, who may have been the same woman as Saliha Sultan Begum.

Gulrukh was thus a half-sister of the second Mughal emperor Humayun, and if she was Dildar's daughter, a full-sister of Humayun's youngest brother, Hindal Mirza.

Salima was, therefore, a half-cousin of Emperor Akbar. Gulrukh Begum, who was known for her beauty and accomplishments in the imperial household, died four months after giving birth to her daughter.

== Education and accomplishments ==
Salima was a highly educated and accomplished woman, has often been described as extremely talented, and was tactful. Proficient in Persian, she was a gifted writer and a renowned poet of her time. She wrote under the pseudonym of Makhfi, a pseudonym later adopted by her equally talented step great-great-granddaughter, the gifted poetess, Princess Zeb-un-Nissa. Salima was also a passionate lover of books and was very fond of reading. She not only maintained a great library of her own but freely used Akbar's library as well. Abdus Hayy, the author of Ma'asir al-umara, quotes one of her famous couplets:

In my passion I called thy lock the 'thread of life'
I was wild and so uttered such an expression

Akbar's court historian, Bada'uni, in his book Muntakhab-ut-Tawarikh, gives one passage which throws light on Salima's love for books. The passage runs thus: "On account of the book Khirad-afza, which had disappeared from the library and concerning Salima Sultan Begum's study of which the Emperor [Akbar] reminded me, an order was issued that my allowance should be stopped and that they should demand the book of me." He adds that Abu'l Fazl did not lay his refutation before the Emperor, and he does not clear up the awkward doubt as to what he had done with Salima's desired book.

== Marriage to Bairam Khan (1557–1561) ==
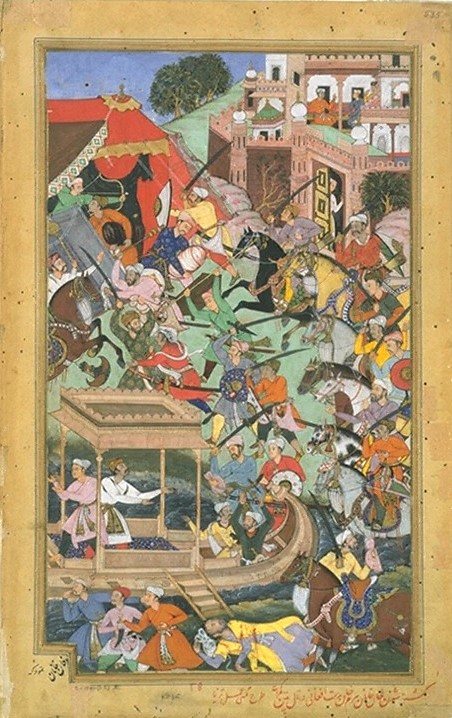
Bairam Khan is assassinated by an Afghan at Patan, 1561

At the age of 18, Salima Begum was married to the considerably older Bairam Khan (who was in his fifties) on 7 December 1557 in Jalandhar, Punjab. Bairam was the commander-in-chief of the Mughal army and a powerful statesman at the Mughal court, who was acting as Akbar's regent at the time. Salima's maternal uncle, Humayun, had promised Bairam that he would give his niece in marriage to him as soon as India was conquered (which was accomplished in Akbar's reign). The bride was probably a reward for the surpassing services done by Bairam for Humayun. The marriage enhanced his prestige among the Mughal nobles, as it made him a member of the imperial family.

It is said that the marriage excited great interest at court. It united two streams of descent from Ali Shukr Beg: that is, the Blacksheep Turkomans from Bairam Khan's side and Timur from Salima's side, as Salima was a Timurid through her maternal grandfather, Emperor Babur, and through Mahmud, one of her great-grandfathers. Salima became Bairam's second wife, after the daughter of Jamal Khan of Mewat, who was his first wife and the mother of his son, Abdul Rahim. Salima and Bairam Khan's short-lived marriage did not produce any children.

Shortly before he died in 1561, Bairam Khan lost his prestigious position in the Empire as he was provoked into rebelling against Akbar by conspirators who wanted to ruin him. Khan's rebellion was twice put down by Akbar, and he submitted to him. As punishment for his rebellions, Bairam was stripped of all his privileges and Akbar gave him three options: of a handsome jagir in the sarkar of Kalpi and Chanderi, the post of the emperor's confidential advisor, and a journey to Mecca. Bairam Khan chose the last option.

== Marriage to Akbar (1561–1605) ==
While on his way to Mecca, Bairam Khan was attacked in Patan, Gujarat on 31 January 1561 by a band of Afghans led by Mubarak Khan, whose father had been killed fighting against Bairam at the Battle of Machhiwara in 1555. Bairam Khan's camp was also put to plunder and the newly widowed, Salima Begum, along with her step-son, Abdul Rahim (aged four), reached Ahmedabad after suffering many hardships. Akbar was shocked to hear the sad news of his former teacher and guardian's death. As per his orders, Salima and Abdul Rahim were brought under imperial escort to the Mughal court with great honour and respect. Akbar himself married her on 7 May 1561 as a regard for the astute services offered by her late husband to the Mughal Empire and acknowledging her exalted lineage. She was about three and a half years older than him and became his third wife.

The richly talented Salima was Akbar's only other wife apart from Ruqaiya Sultan Begum, who was of the most exalted lineage, being a granddaughter of Emperor Babur through her maternal line. Salima was, thus, a senior-ranking wife of Akbar and became one of the chief consorts. Salima remained childless throughout her marriage. She was entrusted with parenting Akbar's son, who was born to one of the serving-girls (concubine), named Sultan Murad Mirza. He was entrusted for his first few years to Salima Sultan Begum for the upbringing and returned to his mother's care in 1575, as Salima left for Hajj.

Being an extensive reader, she kept accounts of her encounters with the Emperor and the state of affairs. Salima was therefore one of the most important ladies in the Mughal court. In 1575, Salima traveled to Mecca to perform the Hajj pilgrimage along with her aunt, Gulbadan Begum, and many other Timurid ladies. She was the only wife of Akbar who accompanied the pilgrims. Akbar himself was dissuaded from traveling only by the pleas of Abu'l Fazl. The high-ranking female party, under the fortunate auspices of Akbar, left Fatehpur Sikri on 15 October 1575 and after taking a year to get to the sea, set sail for Mecca on 17 October 1576. They were said to have spent three and a half years in Arabia and made the hajj four times, returning home to Agra in March 1582.

== Political influence at the Mughal court ==
Salima had much influence over Akbar and her step-son, Salim, and wielded major political influence in the Mughal court during both the father and son's respective reigns. She played a crucial role in negotiating a settlement between Akbar and Salim when the father-son relationship had turned sour in the early 1600s, eventually helping to pave the way for Salim's accession to the Mughal throne. In 1601, Salim had revolted against Akbar by setting up an independent court in Allahabad and by assuming the imperial title of "Salim Shah" while his father was still alive. He also planned and executed the assassination of Akbar's faithful counsellor and close friend, Abu'l Fazl.

This situation became very critical and in the end, it was Salima Sultan Begum and Hamida Banu Begum who pleaded for his forgiveness. Akbar granted their wishes and Salim was allowed to present himself before the Emperor. Salima Begum went to Allahabad to convey the news of forgiveness to the prince. She went with an elephant named Fateh Lashkar, a special horse, and a robe of honour. Salim received her warmly and agreed to go back to Agra with her. The prince was finally pardoned in 1603 through the efforts of his step-mother and his grandmother, Hamida Banu Begum.

During Jahangir's reign, Salima Begum displayed her political influence on several occasions. After the death of Akbar in the year 1605, Salima Sultan Begum alongside Mariam-uz-Zamani and Shakr-un-Nissa Begum secured a pardon for the Khusrau Mirza, the eldest son of Jahangir upon his succession. She also secured a pardon for the powerful Khan-i-Azam, Mirza Aziz Koka. Aziz Koka had been a foster brother of Akbar's and consequently a great favourite in the harem for decades. One of his daughters had married Jahangir's eldest son, Khusrau Mirza, and when Khusrau revolted against his father in 1606, Aziz Koka was discovered to have been in the plot from the very beginning. Aziz Koka would surely have received the death penalty had not Salima Sultan Begum yelled out from behind the screens:

Majesty, all the ladies have assembled in the women's quarters to pledge their support for Mirza Aziz Koka. It would be better if you were to come here – if not, they will come to you!

Jahangir was thus constrained to go to the female apartment, and on account of the pressure exercised by revered elderly women of Harem, he finally pardoned him.

== Death ==
Salima died in 1613 in Agra, after suffering from an illness. Her step-son, Jahangir, gives particulars of her birth and descent and her marriages. By his orders, her body was laid in Mandarkar Garden in Agra, which she had commissioned.

Jahangir praises Salima both for her natural qualities and her acquirements, saying "she was adorned with all good qualities. In women, this degree of skill and capacity is seldom found." She creates an impression of herself as a charming and cultivated woman.

== In popular culture ==
- Salima Sultan Begum is a character in Indu Sundaresan's award-winning historical novel The Twentieth Wife (2002).
- Salima was portrayed by Manisha Yadav in Zee TV's fictional drama Jodha Akbar.
- Riya Deepsi portrayed Salima in Sony TV's historical drama Bharat Ka Veer Putra – Maharana Pratap.
- Parvati Sehgal portrayed Salima in Colors TV's frictional drama Daastan-E-Mohabbat Salim Anarkali.
- Zarina Wahab portrayed Salima in ZEE5's web series Taj: Divided by Blood

== Bibliography ==
- Begum, Gulbadan (1902). The History of Humayun (Humayun-Nama). Royal Asiatic Society. ISBN 8187570997.
