= Dawar Bakhsh =

Titular Mughal emperor from 1627 to 1628

Dawar Bakhsh داور بخش
- Mirza Dawar
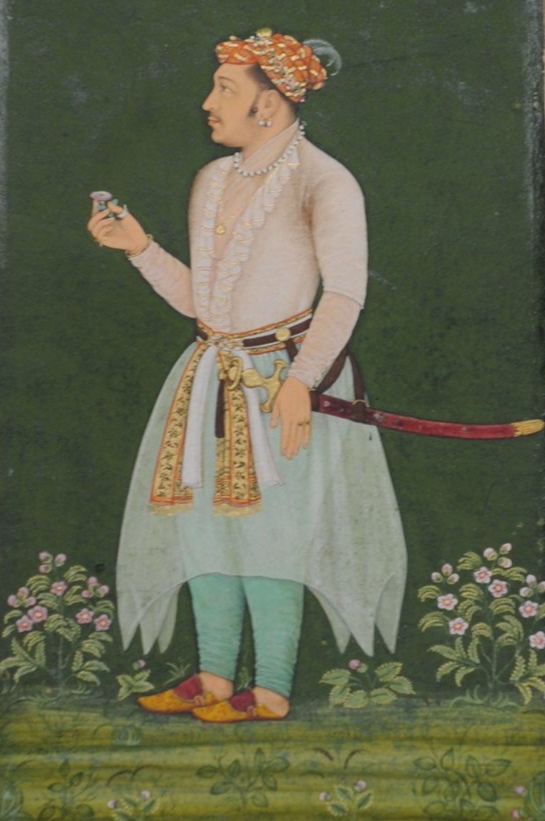
- Portrait of Dawar, c. 1625–30

Titular Mughal Emperor
- Reign: 28 October 1627 – 19 January 1628 (with Shahryar Mirza)
- Predecessor: Jahangir
- Successor: Shah Jahan
- Born: c. 1607; Agra, Agra Subah, Mughal Empire
- Died: 23 January 1628 (aged 20–21); Lahore, Lahore Subah, Mughal Empire
- Spouse: Sister of Raja Jai Singh of Amber (m. 1625)
Names
- Dawar Bakhsh Bahadur
- Dynasty: House of Babur
- Dynasty: Timurid dynasty
- Father: Khusrau Mirza
- Mother: Daughter of Mirza Aziz Koka
- Religion: Islam

Dawar Bakhsh (Persian: داور بخش; c. 1607 – 23 January 1628), which means "God Given", was the ruler of the Mughal Empire for a short time between 1627–1628, immediately after the death of his grandfather Jahangir (r. 1605–1627).

Dawar was the child of Jahangir's eldest son, Prince Khusrau, who was killed at the behest of Prince Khurram (Shah Jahan) in 1622.

Dawar, who was affectionately nicknamed "Bulaqi" (meaning "Nose-ring"), was initially named the Diwan of the Dakhin, and later Governor of Gujarat in 1622 by his grandfather, Jahangir. However, being only fifteen years old at the time, the prince was placed under the guardianship of his maternal grandfather, Mirza Aziz Koka. The Emperor also arranged Dawar's marriage in 1625 to the sister of Jai Singh of Amber to ensure the Raja's loyalty.

Upon the death of his grandfather, Dawar became a pawn in the political game to seize the Mughal throne. He was declared the Mughal Emperor by Asaf Khan as a stopgap arrangement to counter the claims of the Nur Jahan, who wanted Shahryar to succeed.

== Dawar's ascension and death ==
Upon the death of Jahangir, in order to secure the accession of Shah Jahan, Asaf Khan, the brother of Nur Jahan, brought Dawar Baksh out of confinement, declared him king and sent him to Lahore.

However, Nur Jahan favoured Jahangir's youngest son, Shahryar, to ascend, and since he was in Lahore at the time, he ascended to the throne, captured the state treasury and, in an attempt to secure his throne, distributed over 70 lakh rupees amongst old and new noblemen. Meanwhile, Mirza Baisinghar, son of the late Prince Daniyal, on the death of the Emperor, fled to Lahore, and joined Shahryar.

The two forces met near Lahore. Shahryar lost the battle and fled into the fort, where the next morning he was presented in front of Dawar Baksh, who placed him in confinement.

On Jumada al-Awwal 2, 1037 AH (30 December 1627) Shah Jahan was proclaimed Emperor at Lahore, and on Jumada al-Awwal 26, 1037 AH (23 January 1628) on his orders, Dawar, his brother Garshásp, Shahryar, and Tahmuras and Hoshang, sons of the deceased Prince Daniyal, were all put to death.

However, there are some suggestions that Dawar had managed to avoid this fate and escaped to Persia. As late as 1633, ambassadors from the Duchy of Holstein claimed to have encountered him there, and the French glassmaker Tavernier went so far as to state that he had conversed and dined with the prince.

== Ancestry ==
Ancestors of Dawar Bakhsh

8. Jalal-ud-din Muhammad Akbar, Mughal Emperor
4. Nur-ud-din Muhammad Jahangir, Mughal Emperor
9. Mariam-uz-Zamani
2. Khusrau Mirza
10. Bhagwant Das, Raja of Amber
5. Shah Begum
1. Dawar Bakhsh
12. Ataga Khan
6. Mirza Aziz Koka
13. Jiji Anga
3. Daughter
