= Khusrau Mirza =

Mughal prince (1587–1622)

- Mirza
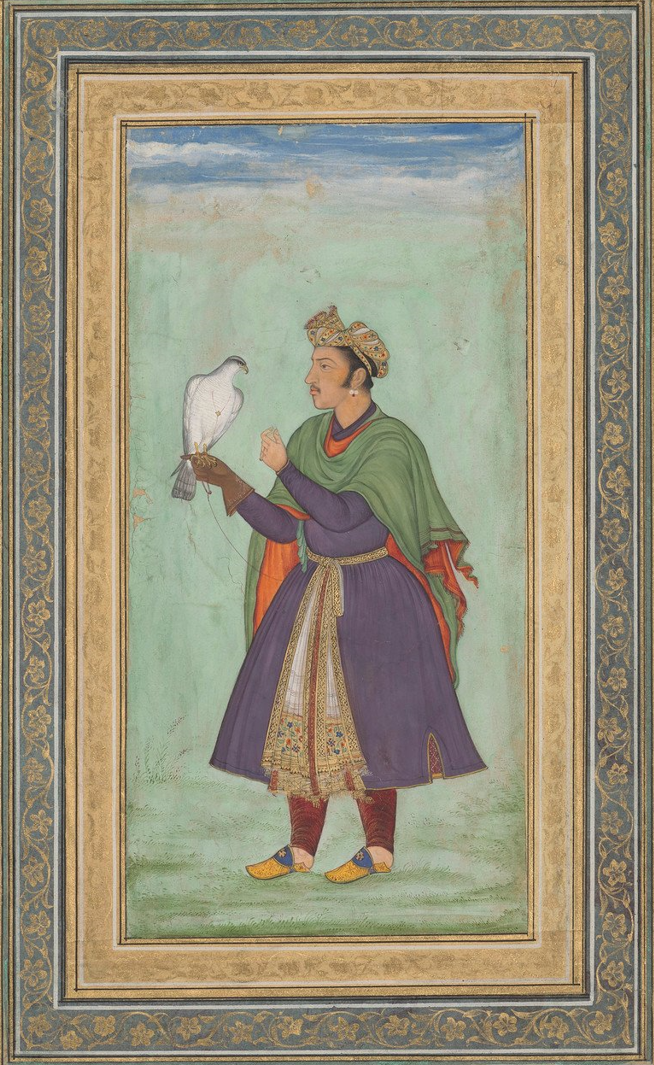
- Prince Khusrau with a falcon

Shahzada of the Mughal Empire
- Born: 16 August 1587; Lahore, Mughal Empire
- Died: 26 January 1622 (aged 34); Burhanpur, Mughal Empire
- Burial: Tomb of Khusrau Mirza, Khusro Bagh, Allahabad
- Wives: Daughter of Mirza Aziz Koka; Daughter of Jani Beg Tarkhan of Thatta; Daughter of Muqim, son of Mihtar Fazil Rikabdar
- Issue: Dawar Bakhsh; Buland Akhtar Mirza; Gurshasp Mirza; Hoshmand Banu Begum; Rateskar Mirza
- House: Timurid
- Father: Jahangir
- Mother: Shah Begum
- Religion: Sunni Islam

Khusrau Mirza (16 August 1587 – 26 January 1622) was the eldest son of the Mughal Emperor Jahangir and his first wife, Shah Begum. Being Jahangir's eldest son, he was the heir-apparent to his father but Jahangir favoured his son Khurram Mirza (the future emperor Shah Jahan) as he held an animosity against Khusrau.

Beloved by his grandfather, the emperor Akbar, Khusrau Mirza came to be considered a candidate to succeed Akbar over his dissolute and choleric father, gathering a court faction which included his father-in-law Mirza Aziz Koka and his maternal uncle Raja Man Singh. After Jahangir's ascent to the Mughal throne in 1605, growing tensions would cause Khusrau to rebel in April 1606. Rapidly defeated, Khusrau was blinded and imprisoned until 1619. In 1620, Khusrau was sent on a mission to Deccan with his brother, the future Shah Jahan. He died at Burhanpur, on the 26 of January 1622: historians generally believe that he was killed by order of his brother.

== Early life ==
Khusrau was born in Lahore on August 16, 1587, as the eldest son and second child of Jahangir. His mother, Man Bai, was the daughter of Raja Bhagwant Das of Amber, India (modern-day Jaipur), head of the Kachhwaha clan and was the chief wife of his father. She was the niece of her mother-in-law, Mariam-uz-Zamani, and thus the maternal cousin of her husband. On account of Khusrau's birth, Prince Salim (later known as Emperor Jahangir) honoured his wife Man Bai with the title of Shah Begum.

His mother was highly devoted to her husband and sided with him over her son when the latter plotted to overthrow his father. She continuously advised Khusrau to be sincere with his father. She killed herself on May 5, 1605, by consuming opium when the hostility between the father and the son seemingly would not subside and the chances of their reconciliation faded. He was extremely loved by his grandfather Akbar, whom Khusrau would call "Shahi Baba" (royal father), and his father Salim as "Shahi Bhai" (royal elder brother).

=== Education ===
Khusrau received an extensive and top-tier education which was overseen by Emperor Akbar. Akbar had appointed his most able and talented nobles for the education of the young Prince. He had commenced his linguistic education under the liberal scholar Abu'l-Fazl ibn Mubarak who was the Grand Vizier of Akbar, and by his brother, the learned, Abu'l Khair.

He received military training under the most trusted and highest-ranking noble in the Mughal Court, his maternal uncle, Raja Man Singh. A revered Hindu Brahmin named Shiv Dutt Bhattacharya was appointed Khusrau's teacher who taught him at length about various Hindu scriptures. Furthermore, Akbar himself invested time in his military training to teach him different warfare tactics.

== Character ==
As noted by a European clergyman of the Mughal court, Khusrau had a pleasing demeanour and moderate manners which made him popular at court. At the age of 17 he had already distinguished himself on the battlefield. On 28 March 1594, Akbar made an unprecedented decision in honour of the young prince in the Mughal Court by granting Khusrau a high imperial rank of 5000 horses when he was six years old. Along with the high-ranking Mansabs, he assigned the financial resources of the province of Orissa to the young prince. Raja Man Singh, Akbar's most trusted general and one of his nine gems, was made his guardian. Further, Akbar insisted that the prince was to remain under his exclusive charge and groomed him personally which was an honour exclusive to him only.

An incident noted by a Christian missionary, on his first encounter with Prince Khusrau, records, "On the evening following our arrival, the Emperor (Akbar) called us and showed us pictures of our Savior (Jesus Christ) and the Blessed Virgin (Mother Mary), and held them in his arms with as much as reverence as though it was our priests. When we saw the holy pictures, we knelt down and saw that the Emperor's 10-year-old grandson (Khusrau), the Prince's son, also clasped his hands and bent his knees: wherein the Emperor was delighted and said to the prince (Salim) "Look at your son (Khusrau)!"

He was praised in the biography of his grandfather, Akbar. Abul Fazl described him as a young prince with possession of great wisdom. Akbar also proclaimed that he loved his grandchildren (Khusrau and Khurram) more than his children. After the death of Prince Daniyal, the favourite son of Akbar, Akbar openly started bestowing imperial favours on Khusrau and his supporters which were prerogative of the apparent successor. Akbar made Khusrau the commander of 10,000 forces, after which his status became equal to that of his father, Salim. His status in subsequent months was raised above his father's when Akbar assigned him a drum and tuman-togh (A staff with a Yaks tail fur affixed), the symbols of honour that were exclusive to the Emperor himself.

His father-in-law, the foster brother of Emperor Akbar, Mirza Aziz Koka was so devoted to the cause of Khusrau that he is recorded to have repeatedly declared:

I am willing that they (the fate) should convey the good news of his (Khusrau's) sovereignty to my right ear and should seize my soul from my left ear.

However, not all sources on the prince were equally positive. His father Jahangir, while praising Khusrau's charisma, considered him easily influenced by his counsellors and bearer of a melancholic streak inherited from his ancestors.

== Family ==
Khusrau's first wife and chief consort was the daughter of extremely powerful Mirza Aziz Koka, known as Khan Azam, son of Jiji Anga, Emperor Akbar's Wet nurse. The marriage took place in 1602 and an order was given that S'aid Khan Abdullah Khan and Mir Sadr Jahan should convey 100,000 rupees as sachaq to the Mirza house by the way of Sihr Baha. She was his favourite wife, and was the mother of his eldest son, Dawar Bakhsh, and his second son, Prince Buland Akhtar Mirza, born on 11 March 1609, who died in infancy.

Another of Khusrau's wives was the daughter of Jani Beg Tarkhan of Thatta. She was the sister of Mirza Ghazi Beg. The marriage was arranged by Khusrau's grandfather, Emperor Akbar. Another of his wives was the daughter of Muqim, son of Mihtar Fazil Rikabdar (stirrup holder). She was the mother of Prince Gurshasp Mirza, born on 8 April 1616. Khusrau had also an other son, Rateskar Mirza, by an unknown woman; and a daughter, Hoshmand Banu Begum, born in about 1605, and married to Prince Hoshang Mirza, son of Prince Daniyal Mirza.

== Jahangir's reign ==
Towards the end of Emperor Akbar's reign, concern had risen among the empire's elite over his succession. Akbar's oldest son, Prince Salim, was the natural candidate for succession but had alienated both court and popular opinion due to his debauchery, religious intolerance and violent temper. He had also briefly revolted against his father in 1601, forming his own court in Allahabad, and again in 1603. In these circumstances, a faction came to favor Khusrau over his father. This faction included his uncle Raja Man Singh, his father-in-law Aziz Khan Koka and Sher Afghan Khan, and, according to some English travellers, briefly convinced Akbar to change his succession plans in favor of Khusrau. However, Salim also had supporters at court such as Shaikh Farid Bukhari, and managed to reconcile with his father in November 1604. In October 1605, after the death of Akbar, Salim was proclaimed emperor Jahangir, had Khusrau confined to house arrest in the Agra Fort and removed the members of Khusrau's faction from power. Khusrau was eventually pardoned by Jahangir, by the intervention of Jahangir's mother and sisters, as well as Khusrau’s stepmothers and sisters. Mariam-uz-Zamani, Khusrau's grandmother and Jahangir's mother, became the main defender of Khusrau during Jahangir's reign. As noted by a Christian missionary present in the Mughal court, she secured a pardon for the prince along with Salima Sultan Begum, Shakr-un-Nissa Begum, and Emperor Jahangir's other sisters upon Jahangir's succession.

=== Rebellion and imprisonment ===
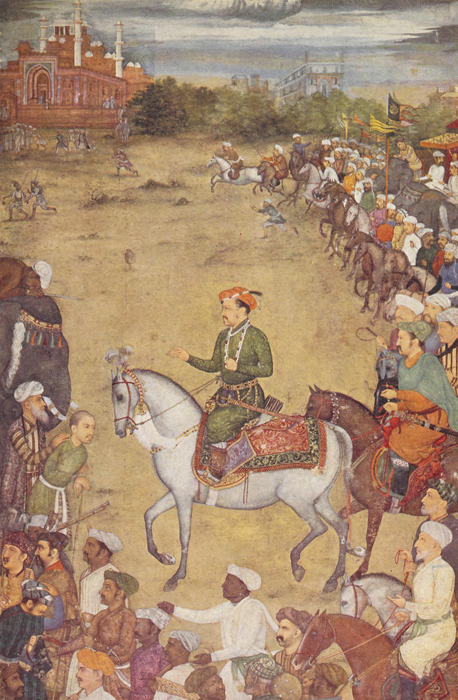
Khusrau is captured and presented to Jahangir.

In 1606, Khusrau rebelled against his father to secure the throne for himself. He left Agra with 350 horsemen on 6 April 1606 under the pretext of visiting Akbar's tomb in nearby Sikandra. He was then joined by Hussain Beg and about 3,000 horsemen in Mathura; and Abdur Rahim, the provincial dewan (administrator) of Lahore in Panipat. Khusrau reached Tarn Taran Sahib, near Amritsar, he received the blessings of Guru Arjan Dev. Khusrau laid siege on Lahore, defended by Dilawar Khan. Emperor Jahangir relieved the siege and defeated Khusrau at the battle of Bhairowal. He was captured by Jahangir's army while crossing the Chenab river, attempting to flee toward Kabul.

Jahangir ordered wooden posts set up along the road into Agra and had the bodies of Khusrau's rebels impaled. Then Khusrau was led on elephant-back down the road and forced to observe his former supporters. He was then confined in Lahore until 1607 when, in the aftermath of a plot to murder his father, he was blinded and imprisoned in Agra. According to the Intikhab-iJahangir-Shahi Jahangir, filled with guilt, later asked his doctors to find a remedy for the recovery of his son's eyesight, which succeeded in one eye.

Khusrau compelled to watch his supporters impaled

While Jahangir had ordered that Khusrau be provided "everything necessary for his comfort and convenience in the way of eating and clothing", he also had him walled up in a tower for 4 months during an hunting expedition. Khusrau's wife pleaded with the emperor to be shut up with her husband, in a show of deep loyalty and love. Ellison B. Findly notes a strong-worded letter of Mariam-uz-Zamani to her son, Jahangir, written in the year 1616, expressing her concern for the safety of Khusrau; Mariam-uz-Zamani feared that if her nephew's charge was to be entrusted to Prince Khurram, that he would eventually kill Khusrau to secure his ascension to the throne, and it would be disastrous for the Mughal dynasty as the future male descendants would use it as a precedent to murder their brothers for the possession of the royal throne. This prediction would come true when Shah Jahan's children, Aurangzeb and Dara Shikoh had a face-off for the royal throne eventually leading to the murder of Prince Dara Shikoh by his brother.

In 1616, in order to secure her power in the Mughal court amidst Jahangir's declining health, Nur Jahan proposed a marriage of her daughter Mihr-un-nissa Begum to Khusrau. However, Khusrau repeatedly refused the marriage proposal, either for love of his wife or antipathy for Mihr-un-Nissa, and the proposal was passed on to and accepted by Shahryar Mirza. In the same year, according to Roe, Nur Jahan attempted to convince Jahangir that Khusrau still planned to usurp the throne, and her father I'timad-ud-Daulah, her brother Asaf Khan and prince Khurram went to the Emperor when he was drunk and persuaded him to transfer custody of Khusrow to Asaf Khan, which happened on October 25.

Khusrau was ultimately released in 1619, when his father felt that his imprisonment had lasted long enough. For the rest of his life Khusrau doesn't appear to have taken part in seditious actions.

== Death and burial ==
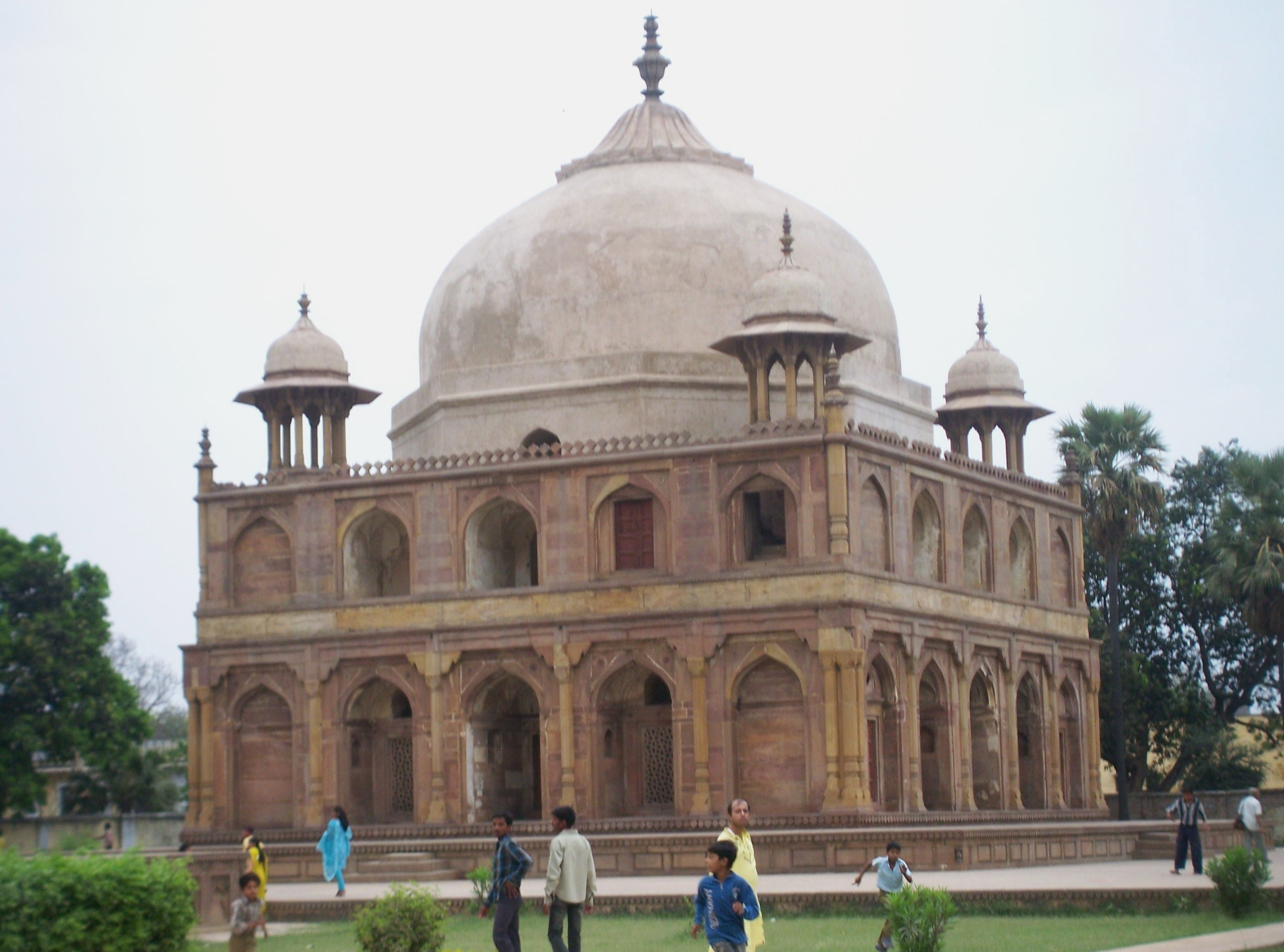
The Mausoleum of Khusrau Mirza in Khusro Bagh, Allahabad

In 1620, Jahangir decided to send his son Khurram in Deccan, against a coalition headed by Malik Ambar. However, Khurram refused to leave without his brother. It is widely believed that Khurram was worried that, while he was absent from court, Khusrau could be in prime position to obtain the throne should Jahangir die. Together with Nur Jahan and Asaf Khan, Khurram managed to convince a reluctant Jahangir to hand over custody of Khusrau before departing in December. In 1622, Khusrau was killed on the orders of Prince Khurram. Khurram claimed, in the letter with which he informed his father on January 29, 1622, that his brother had died of natural causes; but many Persian and European chronicles accused Shah Jahan of having Khusrau strangled, and even his son Aurangzeb considered his father's guilt an established fact.

To honour his son, Jahangir had him buried next to the tomb of his mother, Shah Begum, and ordered the construction of a mausoleum in Khusro Bagh in Allahabad.

== Legacy ==
After the death of Jahangir in 1627, Khusrau's son, Prince Dawar Bakhsh was briefly made ruler of the Mughal Empire by Asaf Khan to secure the Mughal throne for Shah Jahan. On Jumada-l awwal 2, 1037 AH (December 30, 1627), Shah Jahan was proclaimed as the emperor at Lahore.

On Jumada-l awwal 26, 1037 AH (January 23, 1628), Dawar, his brother Garshasp, uncle Shahryar Mirza, as well as Tahmuras and Hoshang, sons of the deceased Prince Daniyal, were all put to death by Asaf Khan, who was ordered by Shah Jahan to send them "out of the world", which he faithfully carried out.

== Ancestry ==
Ancestors of Khusrau Mirza

8. Nasir-ud-din Muhammad Humayun, Mughal Emperor
4. Jalal-ud-din Muhammad Akbar, Mughal Emperor
9. Hamida Banu Begum
2. Nur-ud-din Muhammad Jahangir, Mughal Emperor
10. Bharmal, Raja of Amber (= 12)
5. Mariam-uz-Zamani
11. Rani Champavati Solanki
1. Khusrau Mirza
12. Bharmal, Raja of Amber (= 10)
6. Bhagwant Das, Raja of Amber
13. Phulvati Bai of Mandore
3. Shah Begum (wife of Jahangir)

== Popular culture ==
=== Films and television ===
- In the 2023 ZEE5's web series Taj: Divided by Blood, he is portrayed by Jiansh Agarwal.

== Bibliography ==
- Jahangir, Emperor; Rogers, Alexander; Beveridge, Henry (1909). The Tuzuk-i-Jahangiri; or, Memoirs of Jahangir. Translated by Alexander Rogers. Edited by Henry Beveridge. London Royal Asiatic Society. pp. 78, 81, 279.
- Findly, Ellison Books (1993). Nur Jahan. Oxford University Press. ISBN 9780195074888.
