= Akbar's tomb =

Tomb of the third Mughal Emperor

Tomb of Akbar
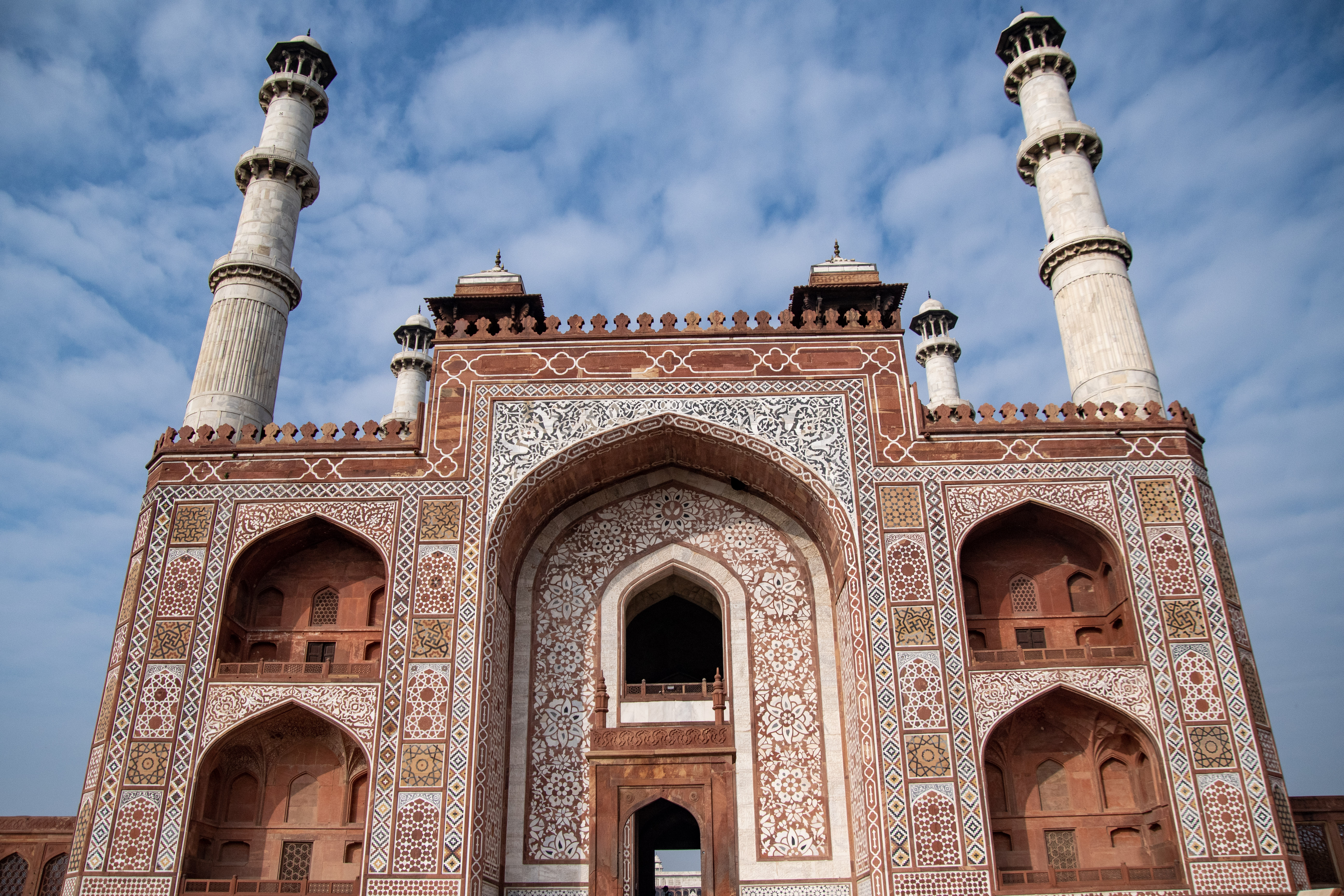
- Akbar's tomb of external entrance from the road, built to imitate the Buland Darwaza at Fatehpur Sikri, the city Akbar founded

Religion
- Affiliation: Islam
- District: Sikandra
- Province: Agra
- Ecclesiastical or organisational status: Tomb
- Leadership: Jahangir
- Year consecrated: 1605

Location
- Location: Sikandra, India
- Interactive map of Tomb of Akbar
- Territory: Sikandra
- Coordinates: 27°13′14″N 77°57′01″E

Architecture
- Type: Tomb
- Style: Mughal architecture
- Completed: In 1613

Specifications
- Direction of façade: Four-tiered pyramid
- Height (max): 100 ft
- Materials: Red Sandstone; White Marble

Akbar's tomb is the mausoleum of the third Mughal emperor Akbar. The tomb was built in 1605–1613 by his son, Jahangir and is situated on 119 acres of grounds in Sikandra, a suburb of Agra, Uttar Pradesh, India. The buildings are constructed mainly from a deep red sandstone, enriched with features in white marble.

== Location ==
It is located at Sikandra, in the suburbs of Agra, on the Mathura road old NH-2(NH-19), 8 km west-northwest of the city center. About 1 km away from the tomb lies the Tomb of Mariam-uz-Zamani, Akbar's favourite wife, who after the death of Akbar laid a large garden around his tomb and was later buried there by her son, Jahangir.

== History ==
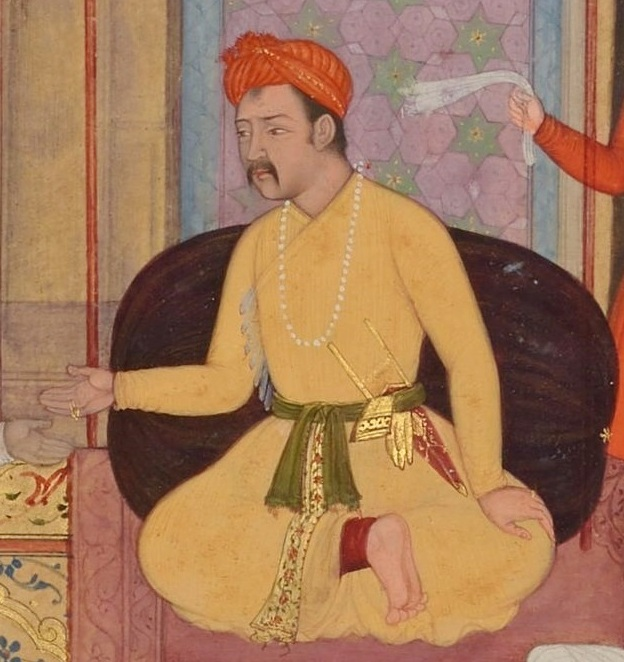
Mughal emperor Akbar at his court.

Akbar I was the third Mughal emperor, who reigned from 1556 to 1605. Akbar succeeded his father, Humayun, under a regent, Bairam Khan, who helped the young emperor expand and consolidate Mughal domains in the Indian subcontinent. Akbar gradually enlarged the Mughal Empire to include much of the Indian subcontinent through military dominance. Akbar's courts at Delhi, Agra, and Fatehpur Sikri attracted holy men of many faiths, poets, architects, and artisans, and become known as centres of the arts, letters, and learning.

On 3 October 1605, Akbar fell ill from an attack of dysentery, from which he never recovered. He is believed to have died on 26 October 1605. After Akbar's death, his son Jahangir planned and completed the construction of his father's tomb in 1605–1613. It cost 1,500,000 rupees to build and took 3 or 4 years to complete.

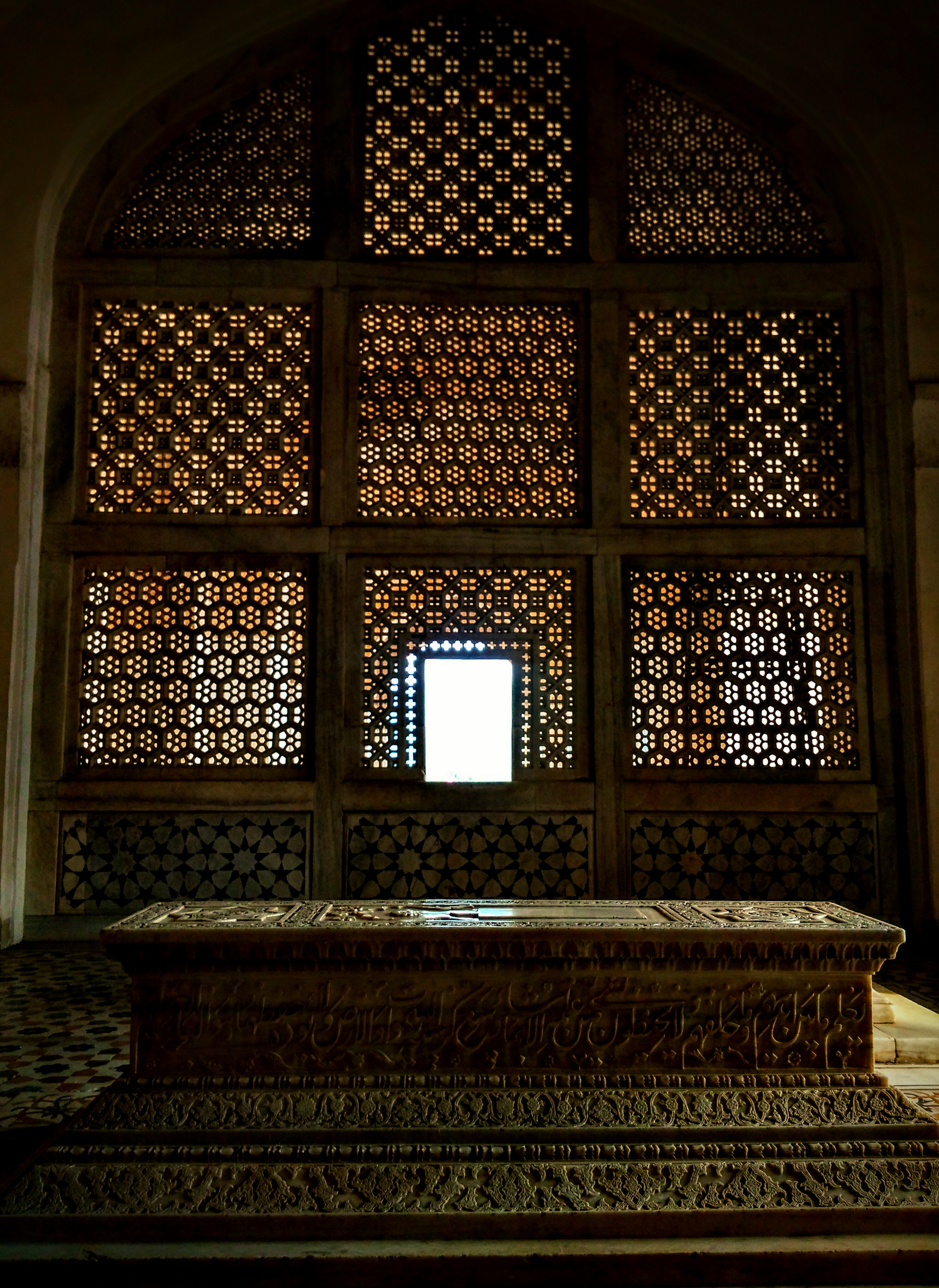
Akbar's cenotaph inside the mausoleum, the real grave as per traditions lies below it

As Viceroy of India, George Curzon directed extensive repairs and restoration of Akbar's mausoleum, which were completed in 1905. Curzon discussed the restoration of the mausoleum and other historical buildings in Agra in connection with the passage of the Ancient Monuments Preservation Act in 1904, when he described the project as "an offering of reverence to the past and a gift of recovered beauty to the future". This preservation project may have discouraged veneration of the mausoleum by pilgrims and people living nearby.

== Architecture and ornamentation ==
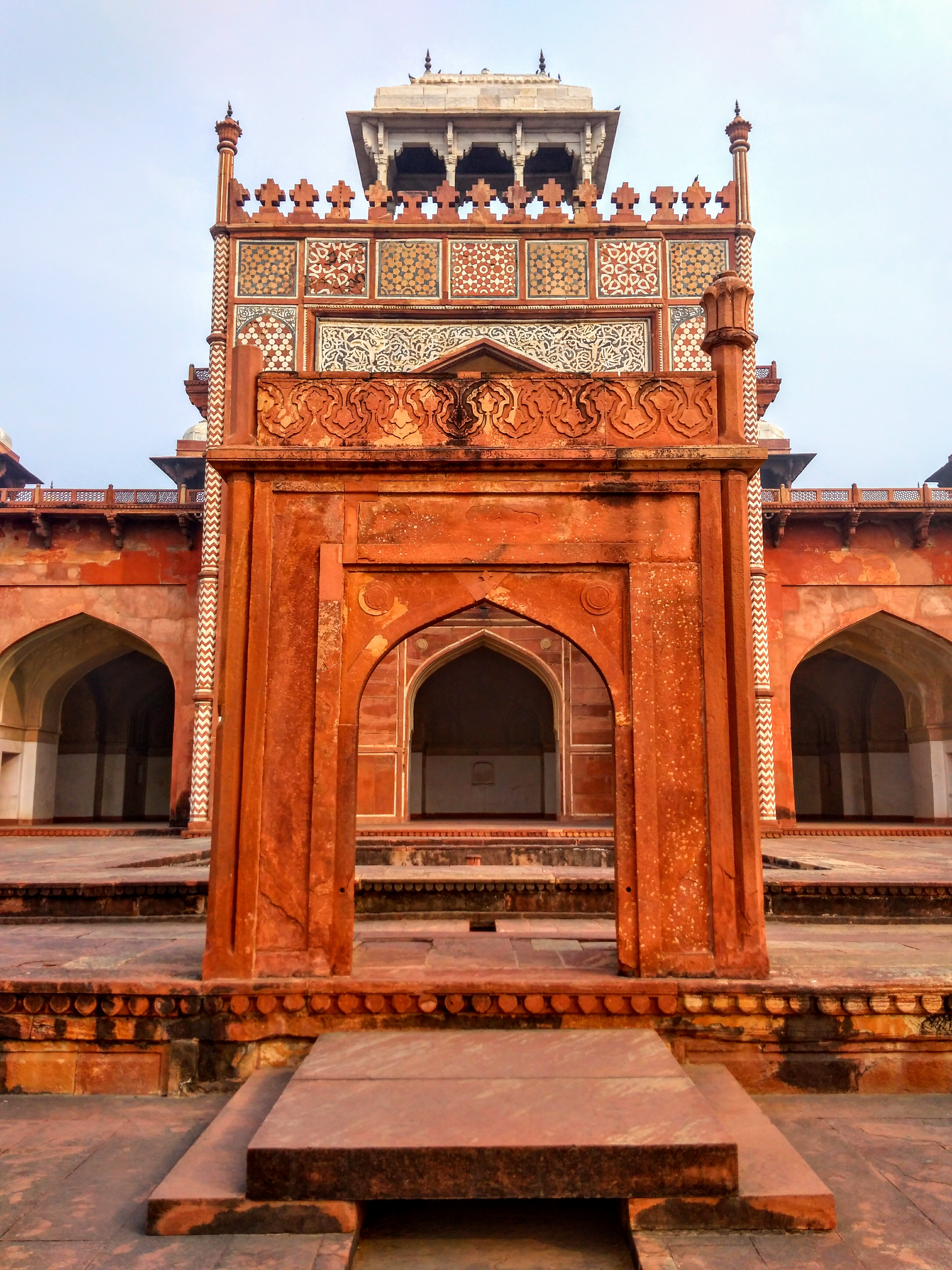
Sideway of Akbar's tomb

The south gate is the largest, with four white marble chhatri-topped minarets, which are similar to (and pre-date) those of the Taj Mahal, and is the normal point of entry to the tomb. The tomb itself is surrounded by a walled enclosure 105 m square. The tomb building is a four-tiered pyramid, surmounted by a marble pavilion containing the false tomb. The true tomb, as in other mausoleums, is in the basement.

The buildings are constructed mainly from a deep red sandstone, enriched with features in white marble. Decorated inlaid panels of these materials and a black slate adorn the tomb and the main gatehouse. Panel designs are geometric, floral and calligraphic, and prefigure the more complex and subtle designs later incorporated in Itmad-ud-Daulah's tomb. There are four gateways in the tomb, which were built using red sandstone and design were inlaid using marble. The roof of the gateway has four kiosks. The magnificence of the gateway is inspired by the Buland Darwaza.

The tomb contains a lengthy Persian eulogy composed and inscribed by the calligrapher ʿAbd al-Ḥaqq from Shiraz who later gained the title Amanat Khan and provided the inscriptions for the Taj Mahal. ʿAbd al-Ḥaqq included his signature in three places.

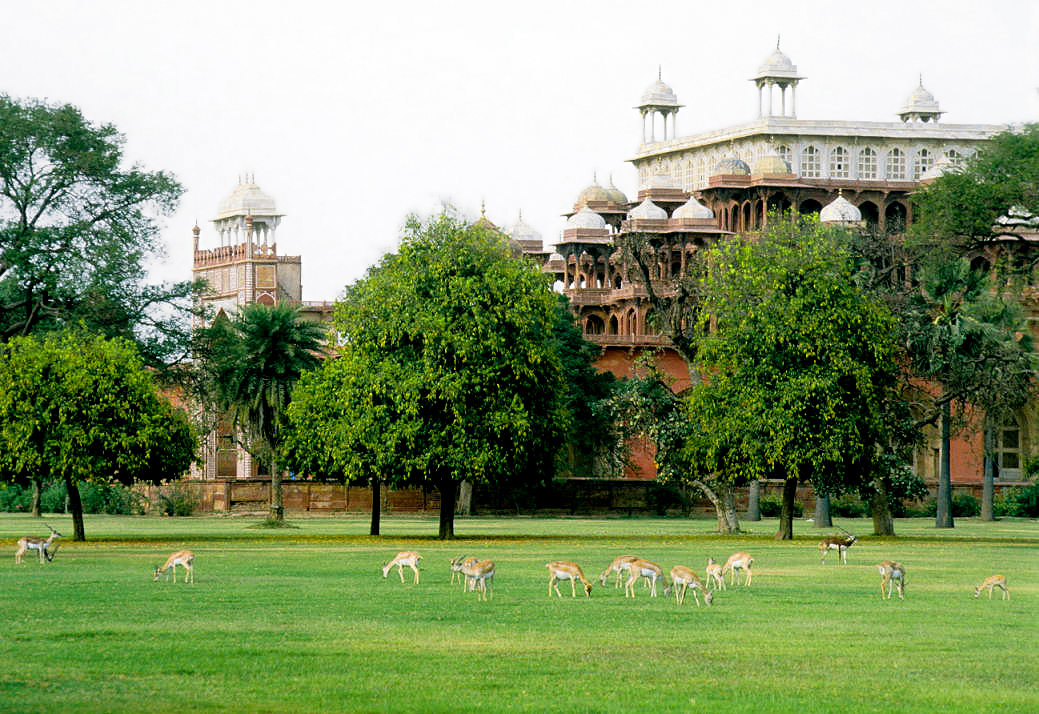
A view of the garden around the tomb

Mariam-uz-Zamani, after the death of her husband, Akbar, laid a large garden around his tomb, which originally had an open baradari (pleasure pavilion) built during the reign of Sikander Lodi, in 1495 AD. After her death in May 1623, she was buried here near her husband's tomb and the baradari was converted into a fine mausoleum by her son, Jahangir. She stands as the only wife of Akbar buried closed to him.

The first floor of the tomb, has cloisters on four sides having arches, and has a hall where the tombstone of Akbar lies. The hall also consist tombstones of Shakr-un-Nissa Begum and Aram Banu Begum, the two daughters of Akbar.

== Destruction of the tomb ==
On 28 March 1688, during the reign of Aurangzeb, Jats rose in rebellion under the leadership of Raja Ram Jat. Mughal monument suffered a severe blow when Jats destroyed Akbar's tomb. The grave was opened and Akbar's bones were burned. This successful raid followed a previous unsuccessful attempt in 1685 and resulted in an escalation of the conflict between the Mughals and the Jats.

== Gallery ==
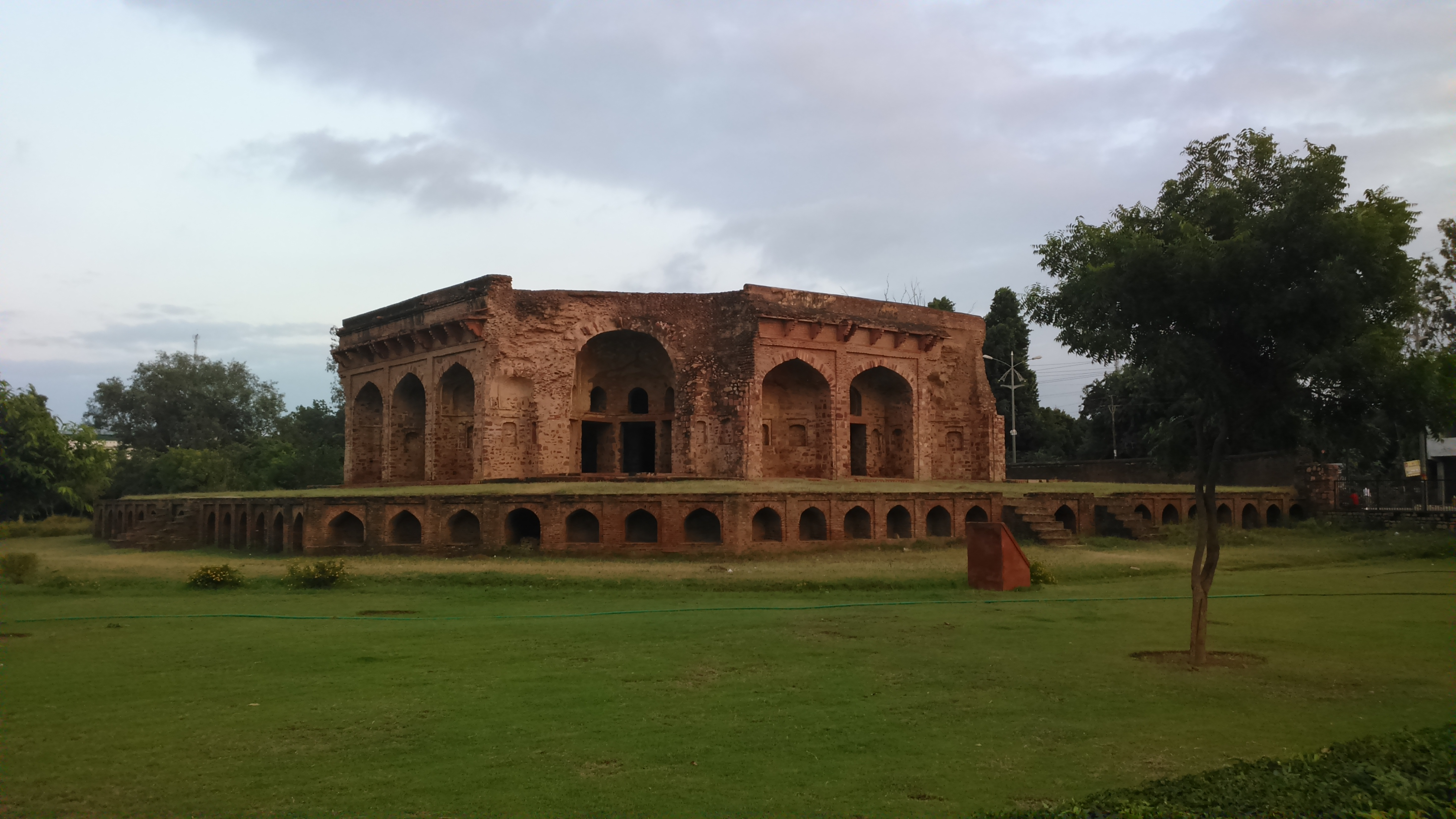
An unknown Lodi tomb in Akbar's tomb complex

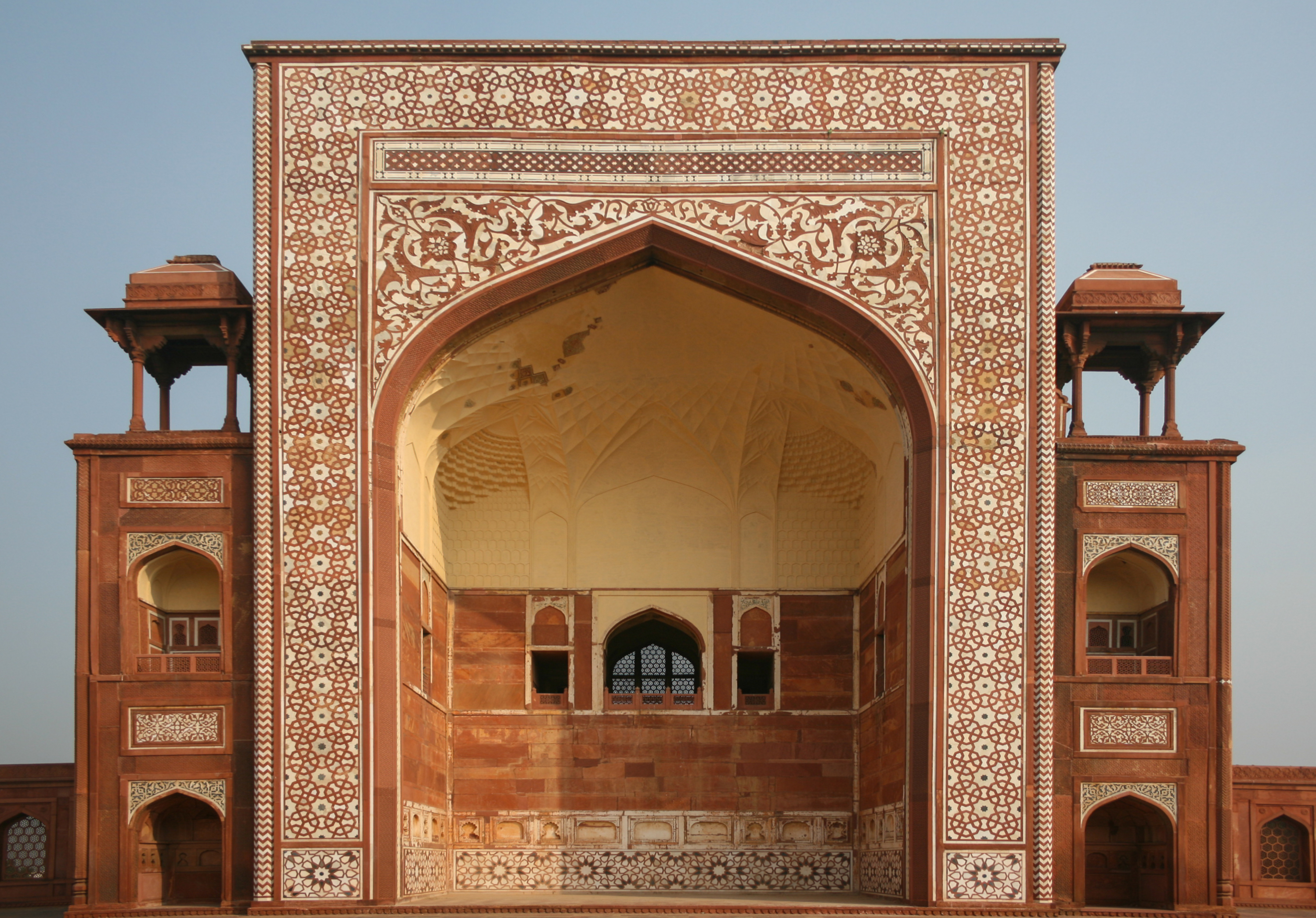
Barrel vault

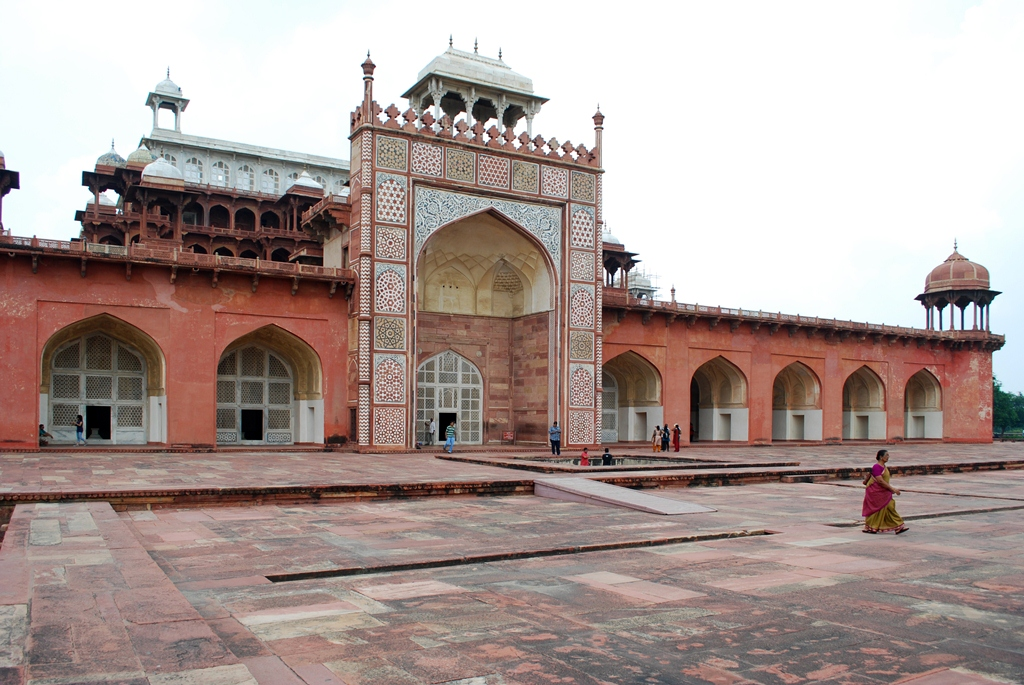
Front façade

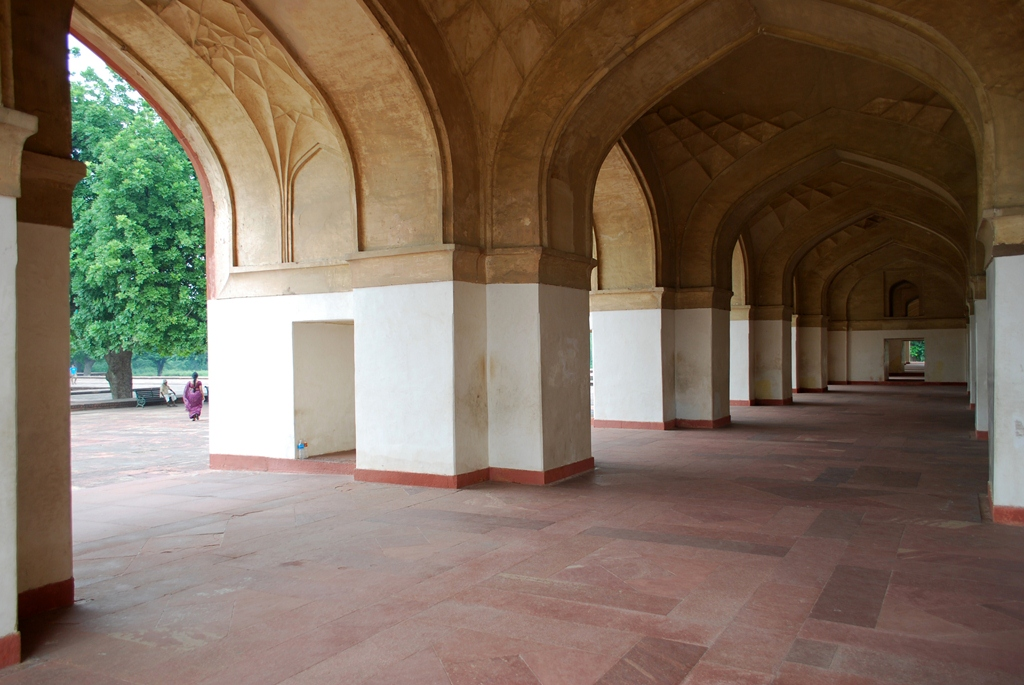
Circumferential gallery around the cenotaph

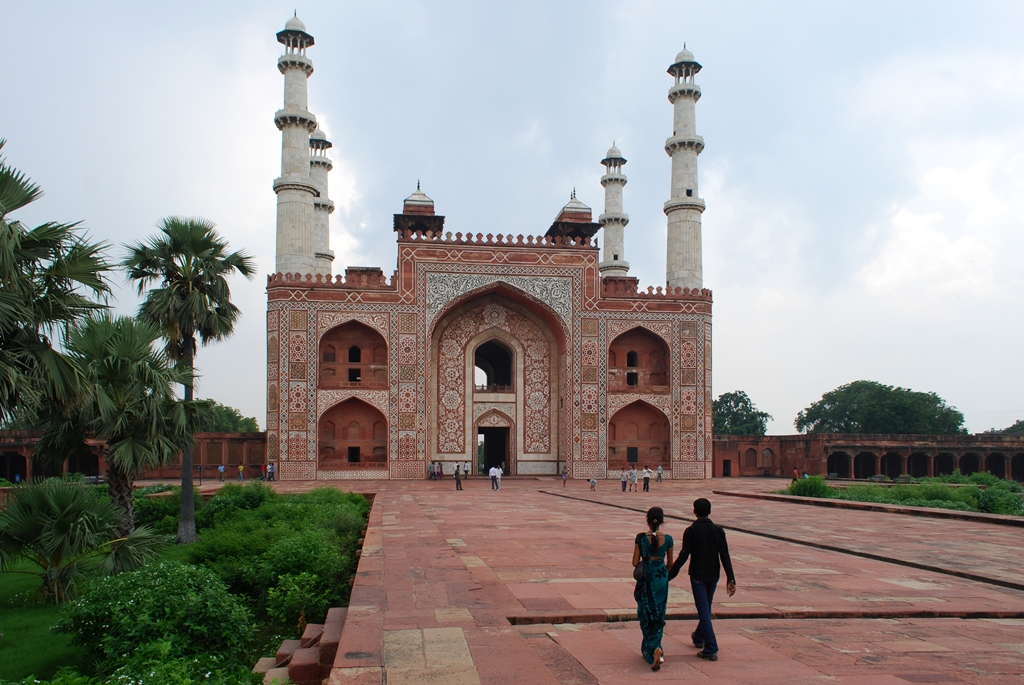
View of South Gate from interior

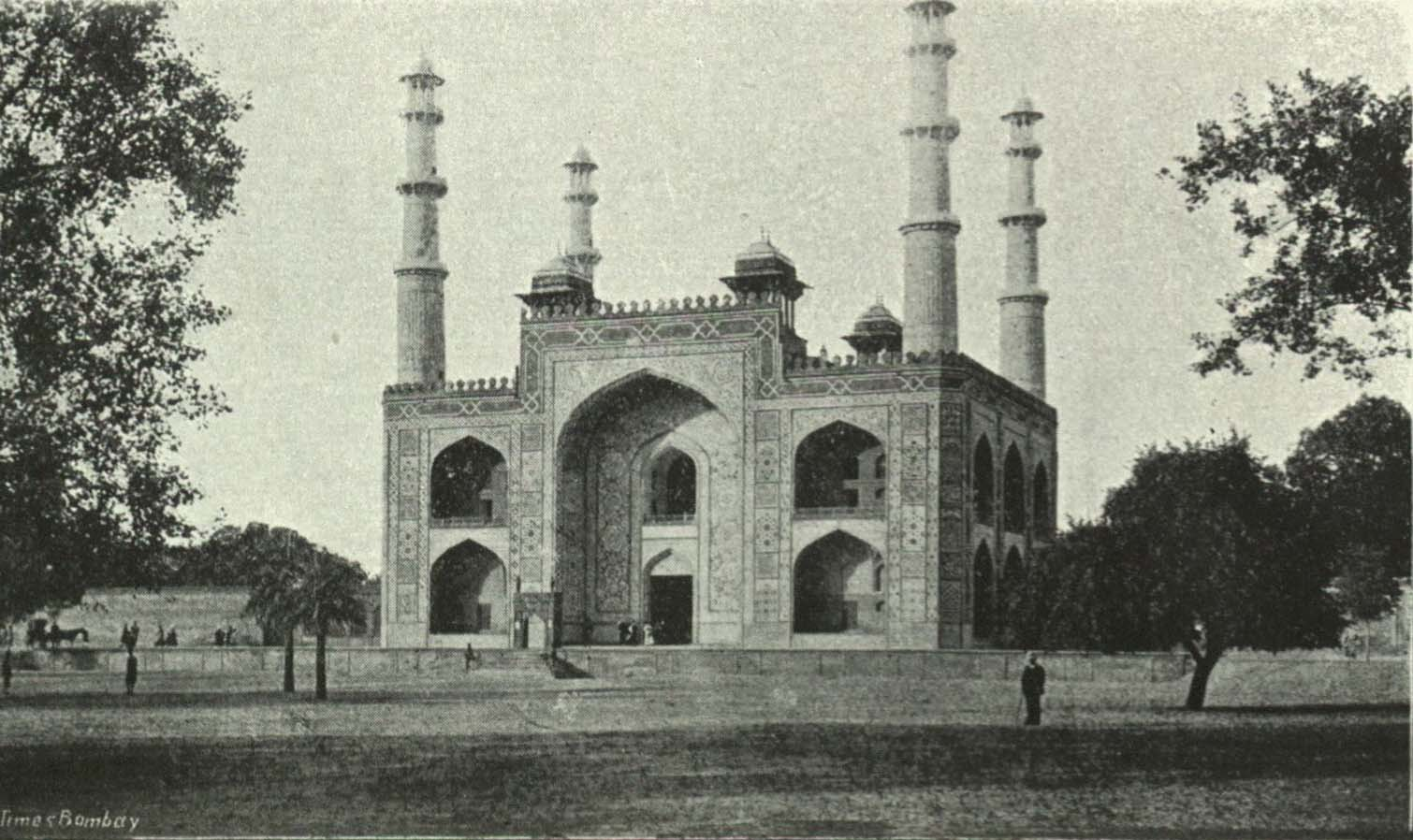
The Tomb of Akbar, c. 1905

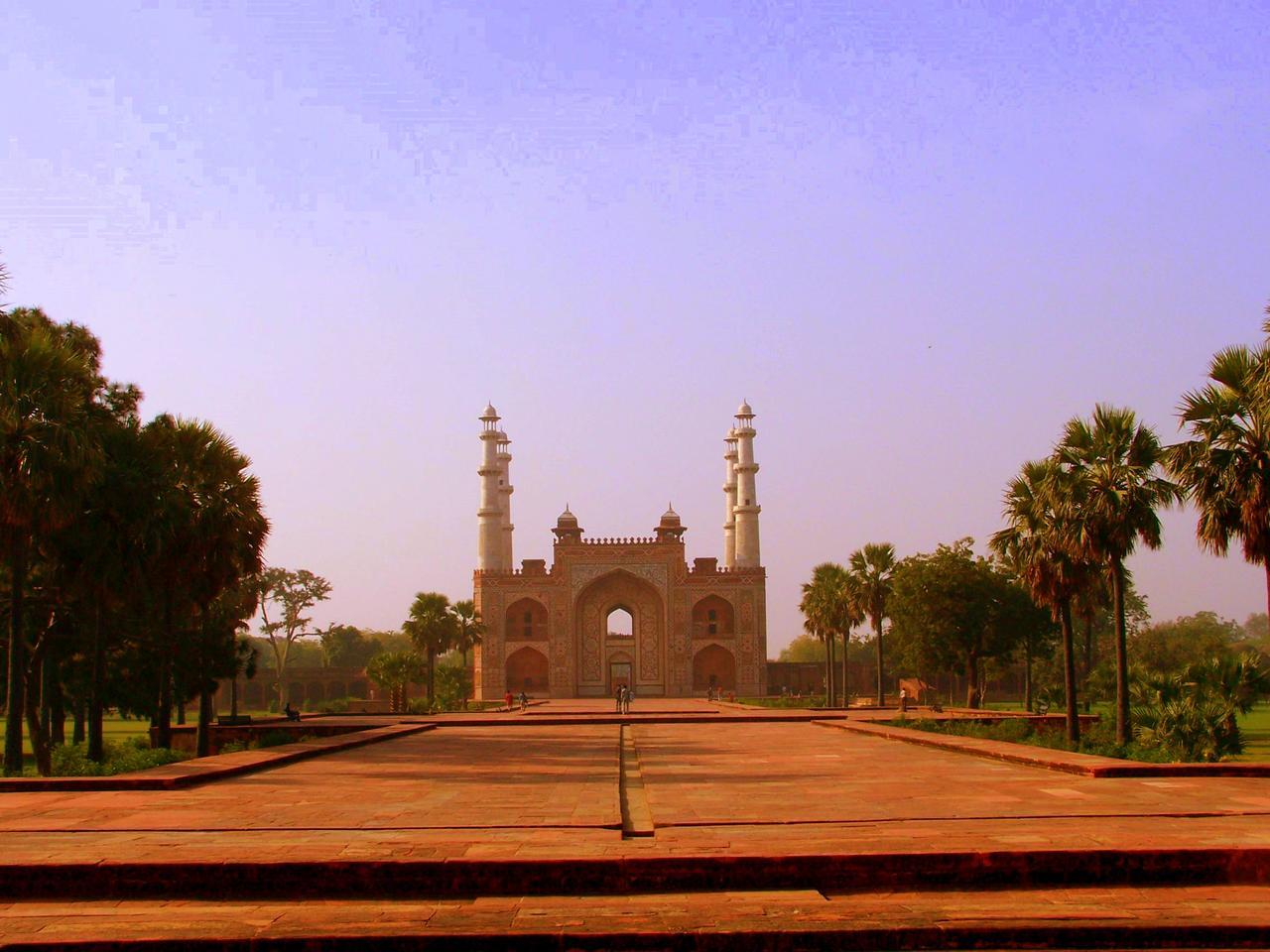
Main entrance of Akbar's tomb complex from inside

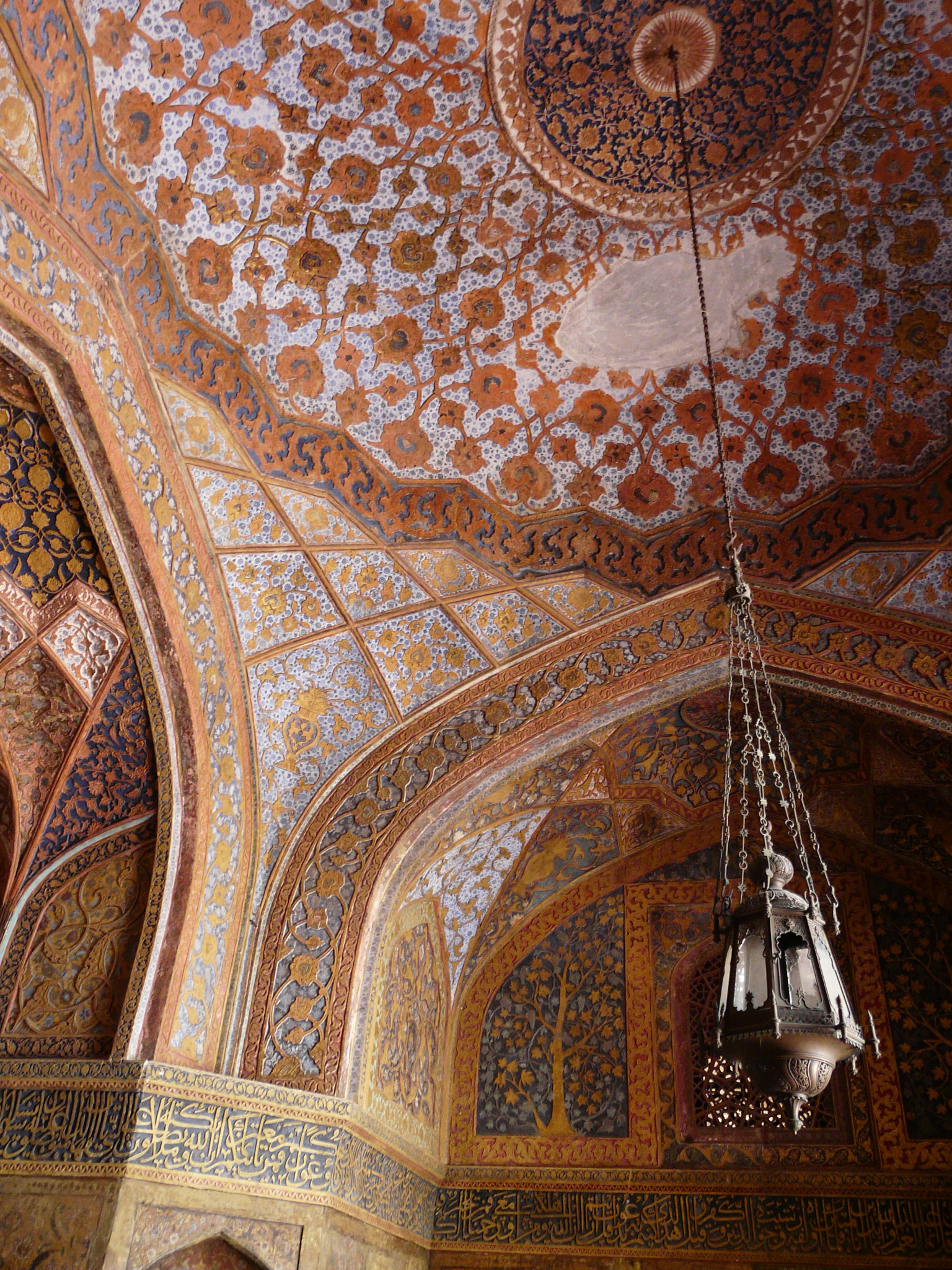
Tomb ceiling details, Tomb of Akbar, Sikandra

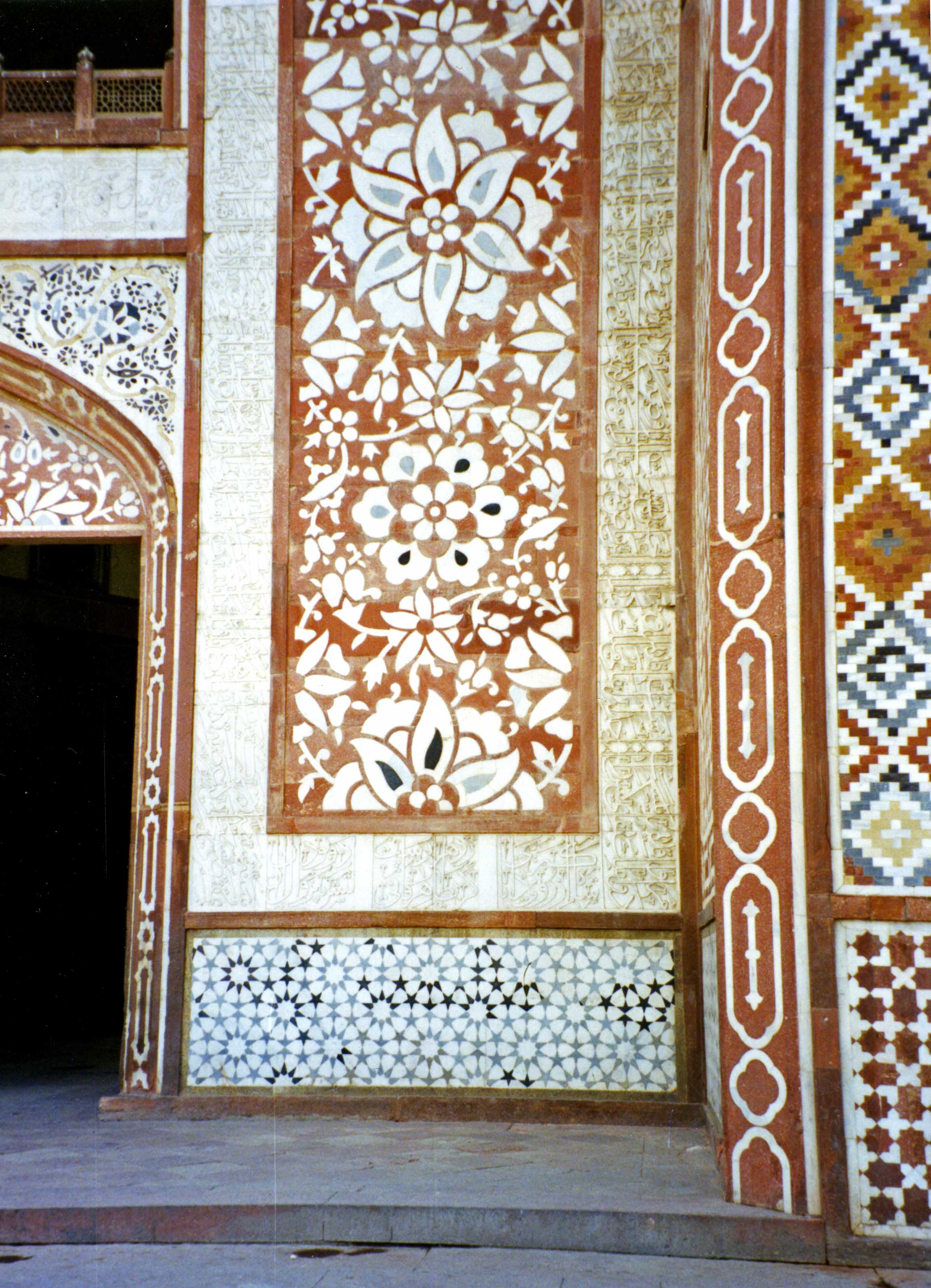
Inlay panels on the South Gate

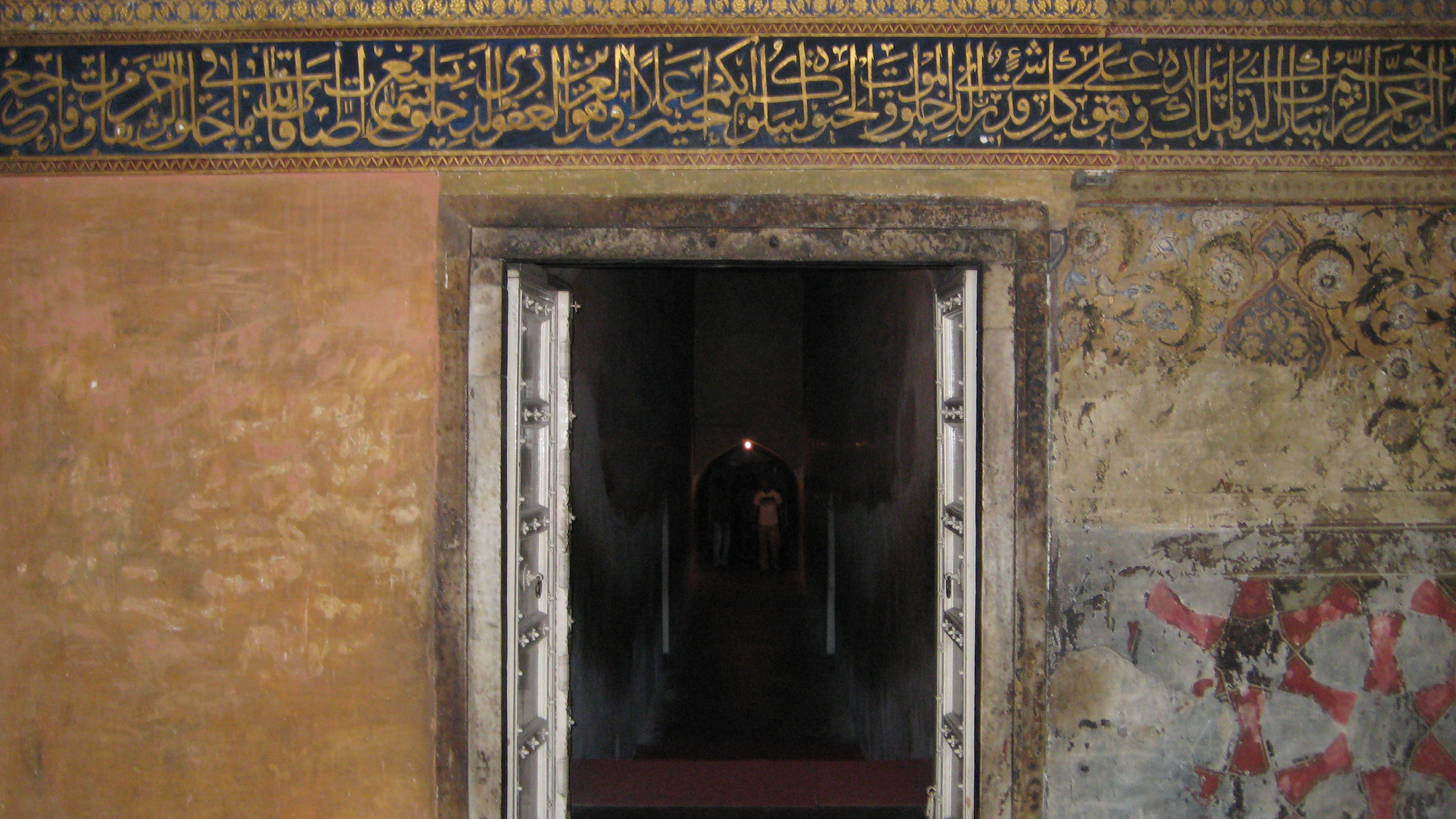
Calligraphy over the entrance to the main burial chamber

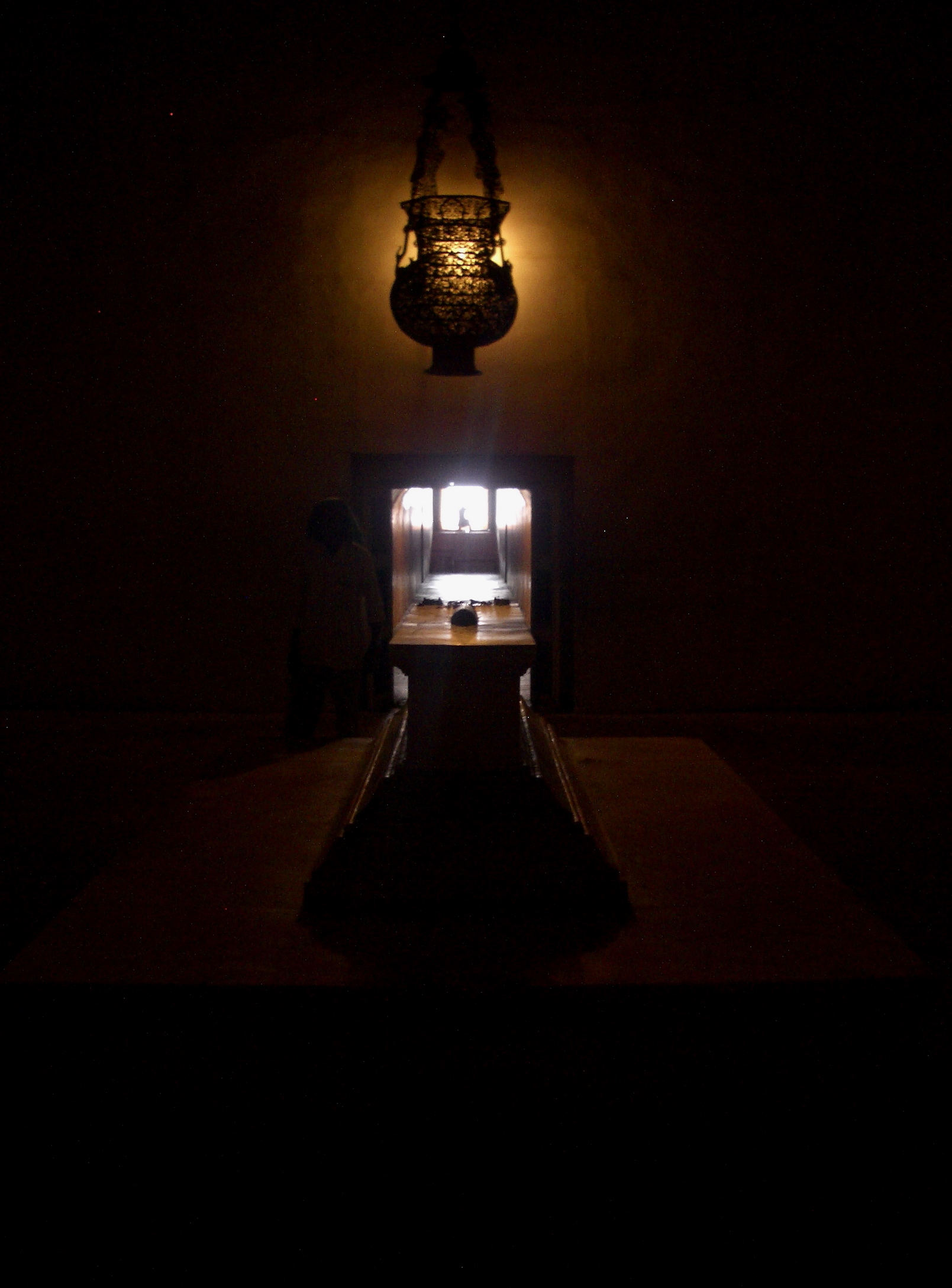
True Tomb of Akbar, at the basement of the tomb

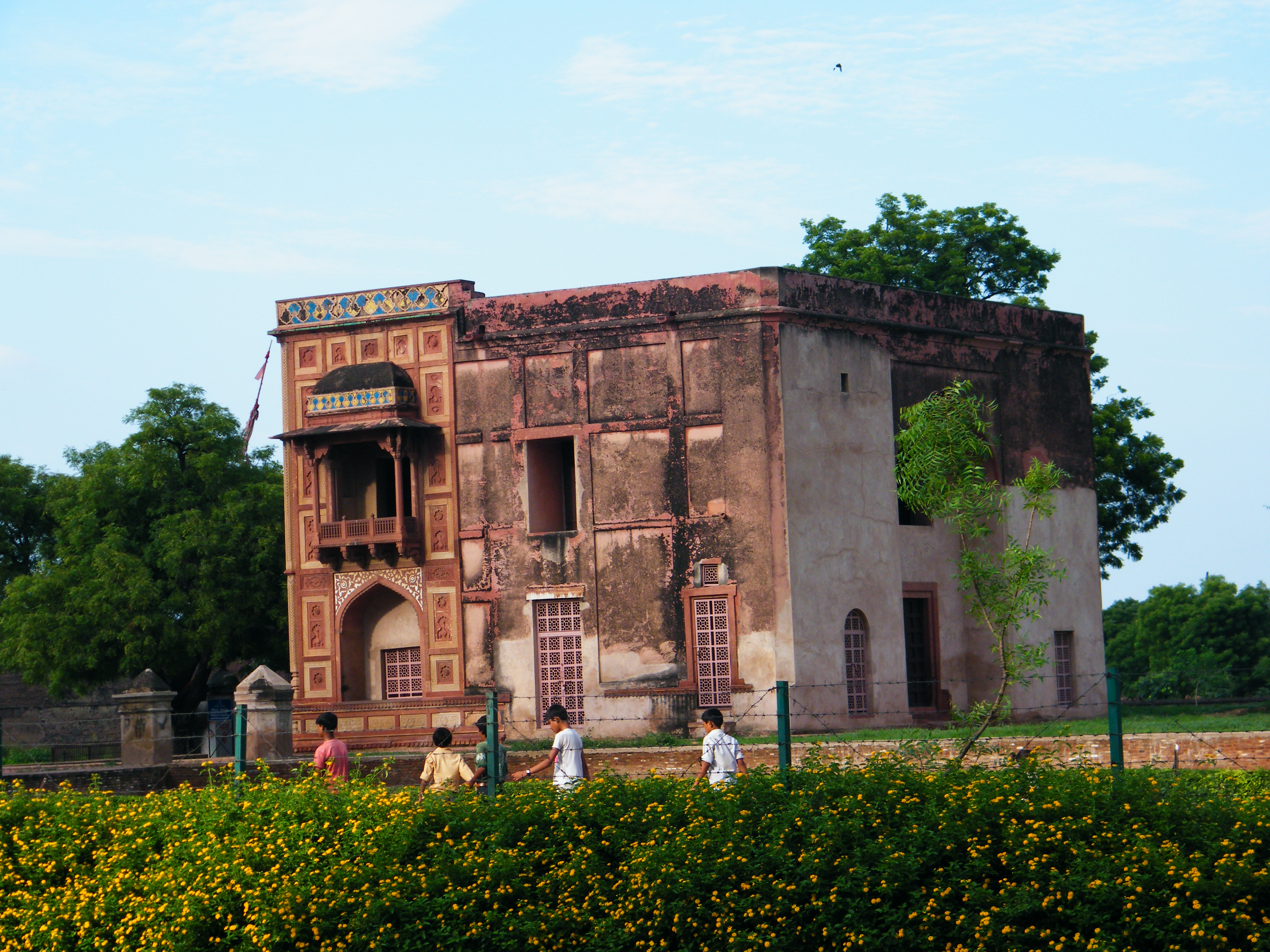
Kanch Mahal, built by Jehangir, as a harem quarter later used as a hunting lodge

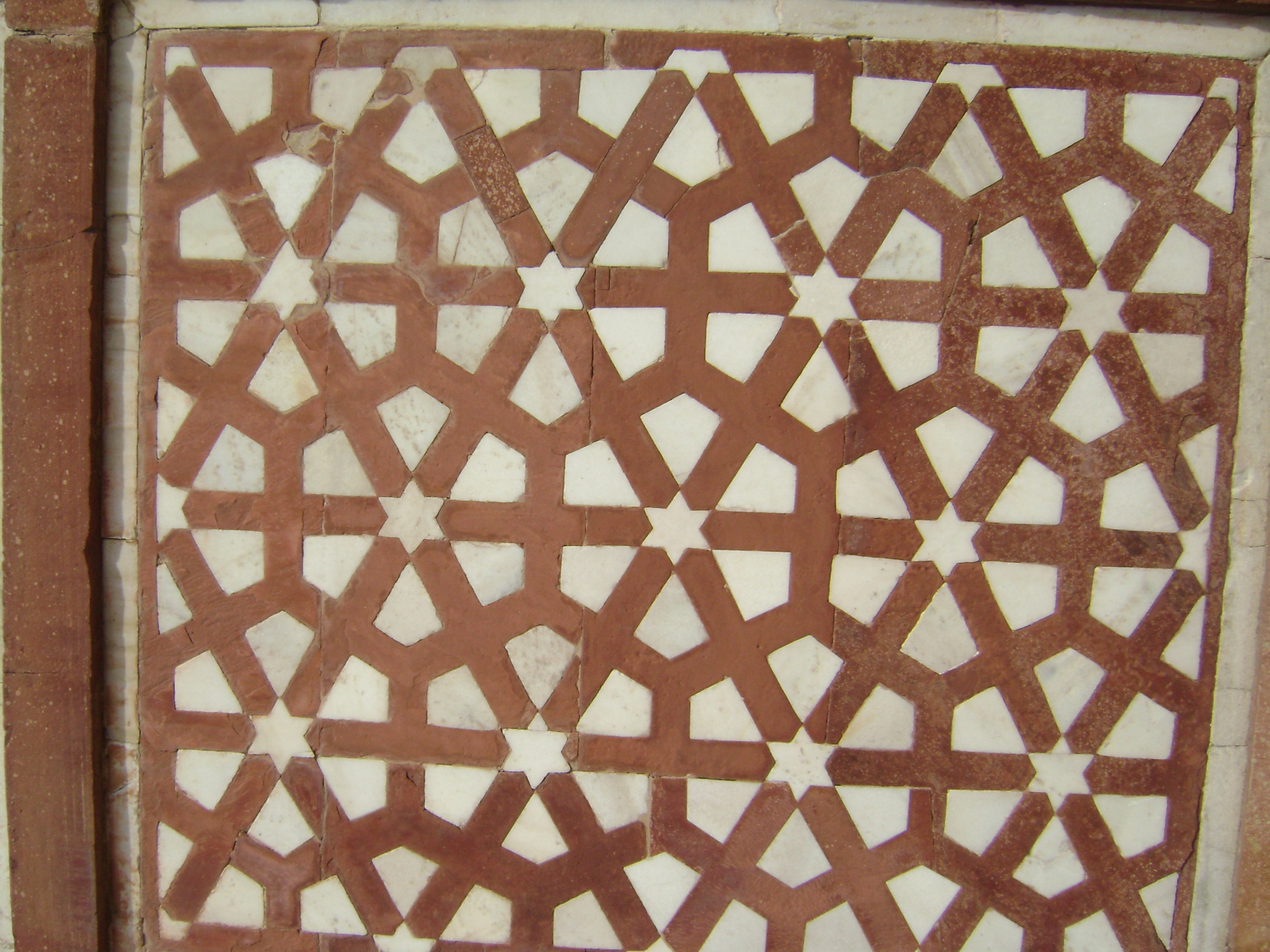
Inside work of Akbar's tomb

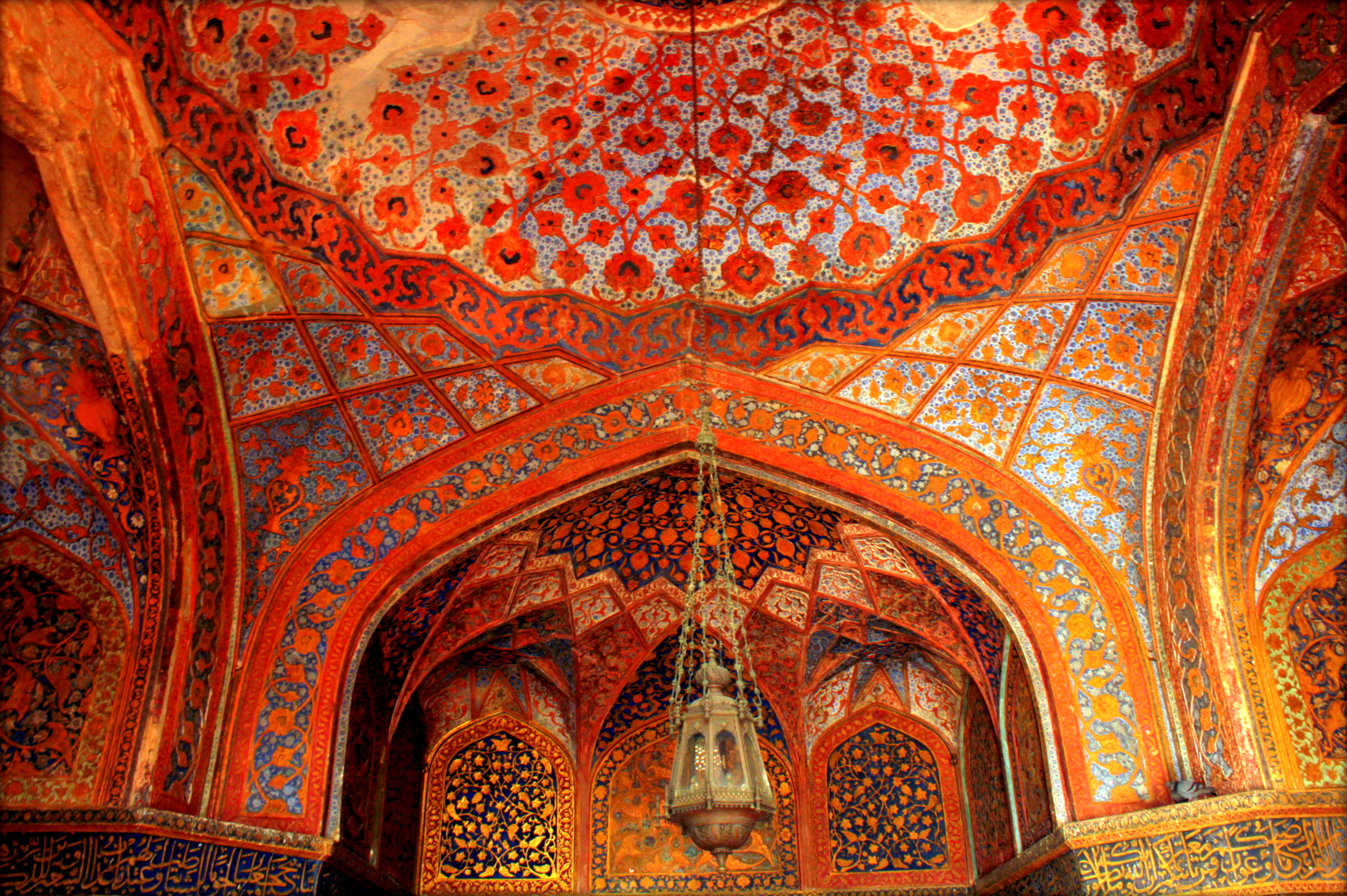
Entrance Arch (inside details) of main Cenotaph

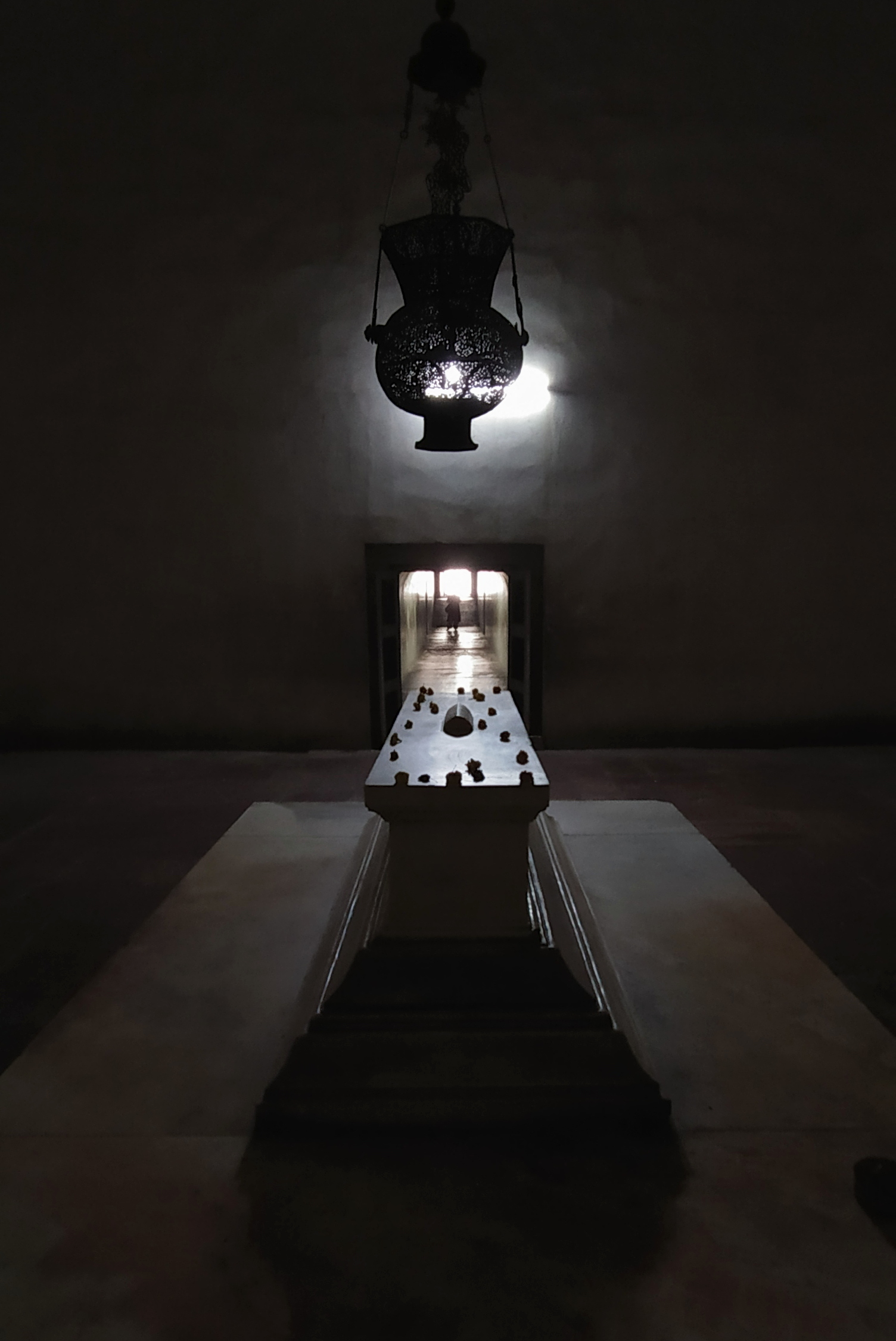
Akbar's tomb at basement

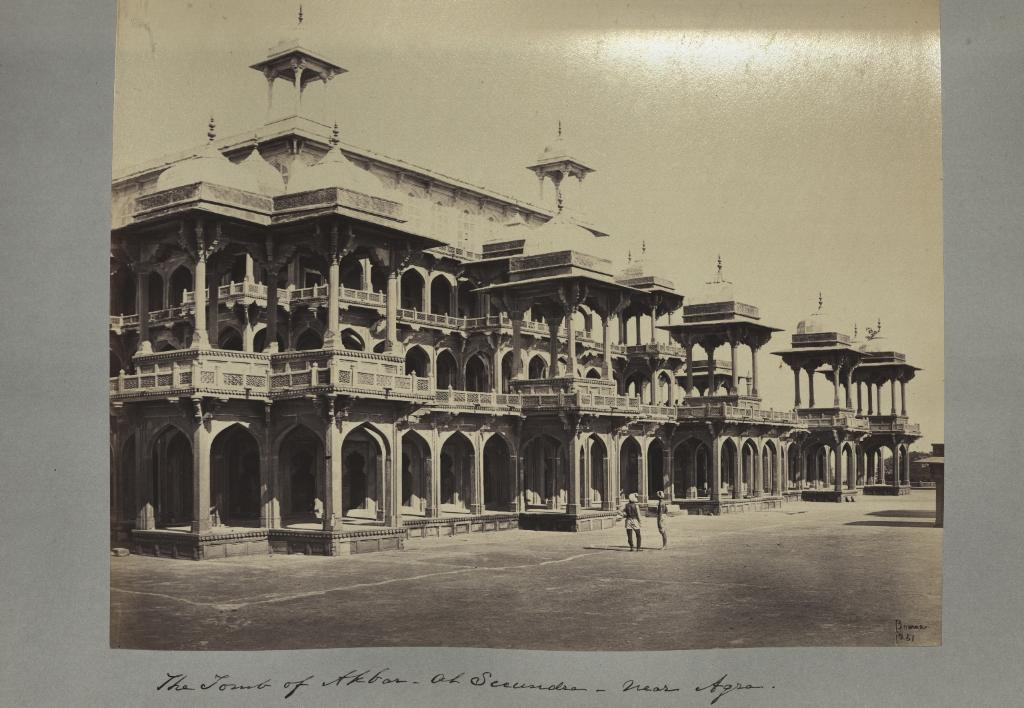
The Tomb of Akbar at Secundra near Agra

== See also ==
- Akbarnama
- Tomb of Mariam-uz-Zamani, tomb of the chief queen consort of Akbar
