= Shakr-un-Nissa Begum =

Mughal princess (died 1653)

- Shahzadi
- Born: Fatehpur Sikri, Agra, Mughal Empire
- Died: 1 January 1653; Akbarabad (present day Agra), Mughal Empire
- Burial: Akbar's tomb, Sikandra, Agra
- Spouse: Shahrukh Mirza (m. 1594; d. 1607)
- House: Timurid
- Father: Akbar
- Mother: Bibi Daulat Shad
- Religion: Sunni Islam

Shakr-un-Nissa Begum, also Shakr al-Nisa Begum (died 1 January 1653) was a Mughal princess, and a daughter of Emperor Akbar.

== Early life ==
Shakr-un-Nissa Begum was born at Fatehpur Sikri, to Akbar and Bibi Daulat Shad. She had a younger full sister named Aram Banu Begum.

Shakr-un-Nissa was brought up in Akbar's care and turned out to be very well, good-natured, and innately compassionate towards all people. Jahangir had great fondness for his half-sister.

== Marriage and Family ==
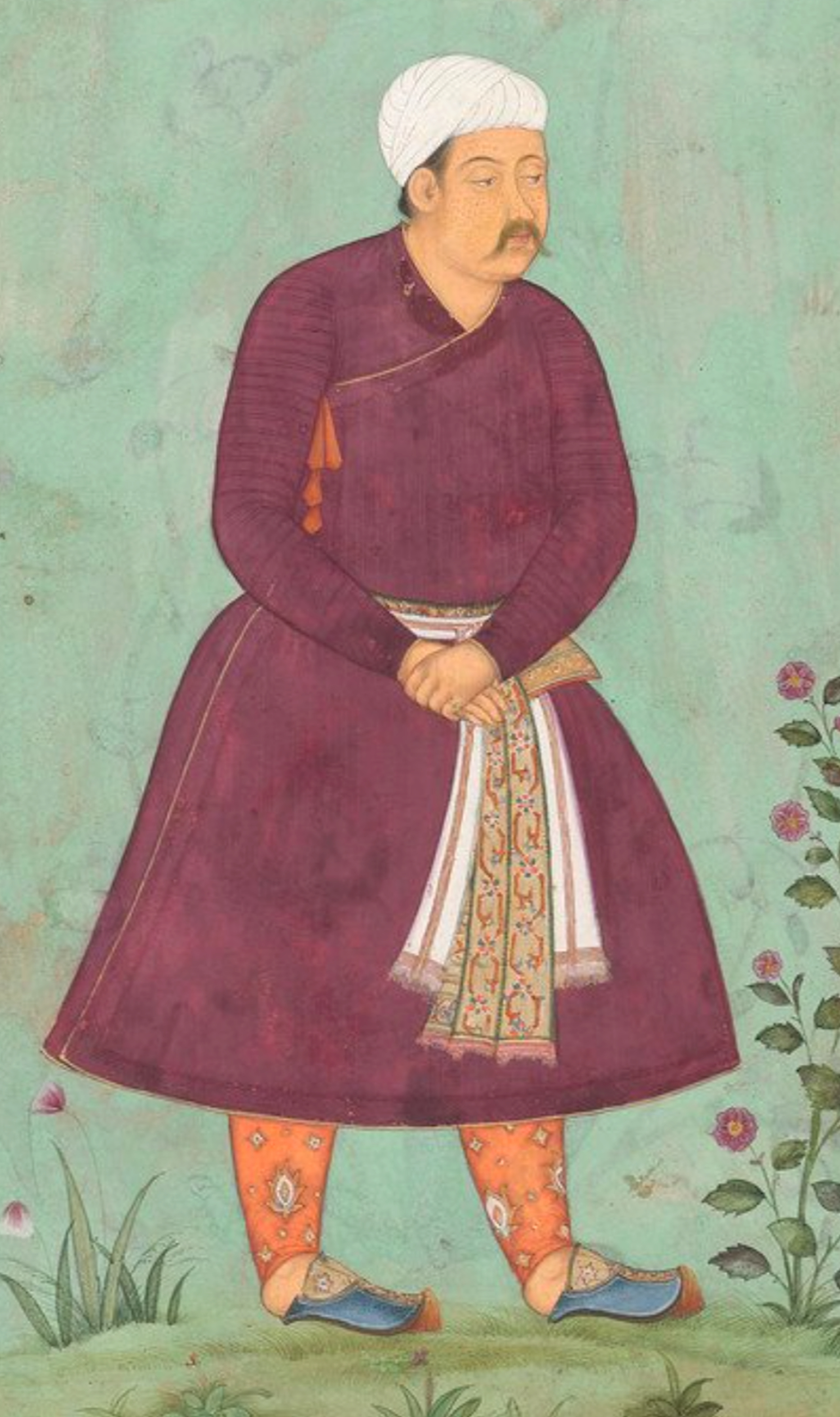
Mirza Shah Rukh (d. 1607-8) ruler of Badakhshan. Married Shakr-un-Nissa Begum, and became ruler of Malwa after fleeing to the Mughal Empire.

In 1594, Akbar arranged her marriage with Shahrukh Mirza. He was the son of Ibrahim Mirza, the son of Suleiman Mirza of Badakshan and Haram Begum. His mother was Muhtarima Khanum, the daughter of Shah Muhammad Sultan Jagatai (grandson of Mahmud Khan) and Khadija Sultan Khanum (daughter of Ahmad Alaq). The marriage took place on 2 September 1594 in the quarters of Empress Hamida Banu Begum.

Shahrukh Mirza was also married to Shakr-un-Nissa's cousin, Kabuli Begum, the daughter of her uncle Mirza Muhammad Hakim.

Shakr-un-Nissa became a widow, after Shahrukh Mirza's death in 1607. According to Jahangirnama, he died leaving four sons, Hasan Mirza and Husayn Mirza, who were twins, Sultan Mirza, and Badi-uz-Zaman Mirza, and three daughters. However, Ma'asir ul Umara states that Shahrukh Mirza had eight sons: his oldest son, Mirza Muhammad Zaman was killed in battle in Badakhshan, his second son Mirza Salih Muhammad was imprisoned by Mirza Muhammad Hakim, and in addition to his sons by Shakr-un-Nisa Begum, he had two more sons, Mirza Mughal and Mirza Shuja Najabat Khan.

After the death of Akbar in the year 1605, she exercised her influence over her brother Jahangir and aided her stepmothers Mariam-uz-Zamani and Salima Sultan Begum to secure a pardon for the Khusrau Mirza, the eldest son of Jahangir. Of her sons, Hasan Mirza supported Khusrau and was thus captured and imprisoned by Jahangir. Sultan Mirza, her third son, was close to his uncle the emperor, and Jahangir wanted to give his own daughter to him in marriage. However, when asked about his numbers of wives, he lied, and thus fell out of favor. Her youngest son, Badi-uz-Zaman Mirza, was given the fief of Patton in Gujarat. However, he was killed by his brothers, and Shakr-un-Nisa brought an appeal to the imperial court of justice. But since she did not bring a charge of murder against her other sons and stepsons, they were imprisoned for a short time before being set free. Her stepson, Mirza Mughal, was married to the daughter of Darab Khan, a grandson of the famous general Bairam Khan, and lived in his fief of Nimkhar-Bhaiswara.

Mirza Shuja Najabat Khan, however, was the most distinguished of her sons and stepsons- while he was appointed a faujdar of Multan before, just before Shah Jahan's illness he was sent as a military advisor to prince Aurangzeb. As a member of the house of Timur he was immensely respected by the prince, and when Aurangzeb declared a rebellion against his father, Najabat Khan was the highest ranking officer in his army. When Shah Jahan himself decided to take the field against Aurangzeb, and many officers suggested him to go back to Deccan, Mirza Mughal affirmed his loyalty to Aurangzeb, and declared, "Considering you to be a man of determination I have made up my mind to quarrel with my master (Shah Jahan). Now the affair is in your hands. When I am excited, I will even cross swords with the Lord or the Universe (Jahangir). Come what may!" Aurangzeb was always grateful to him, and appointed him the governor of Malwa after his ascension.

== Death ==
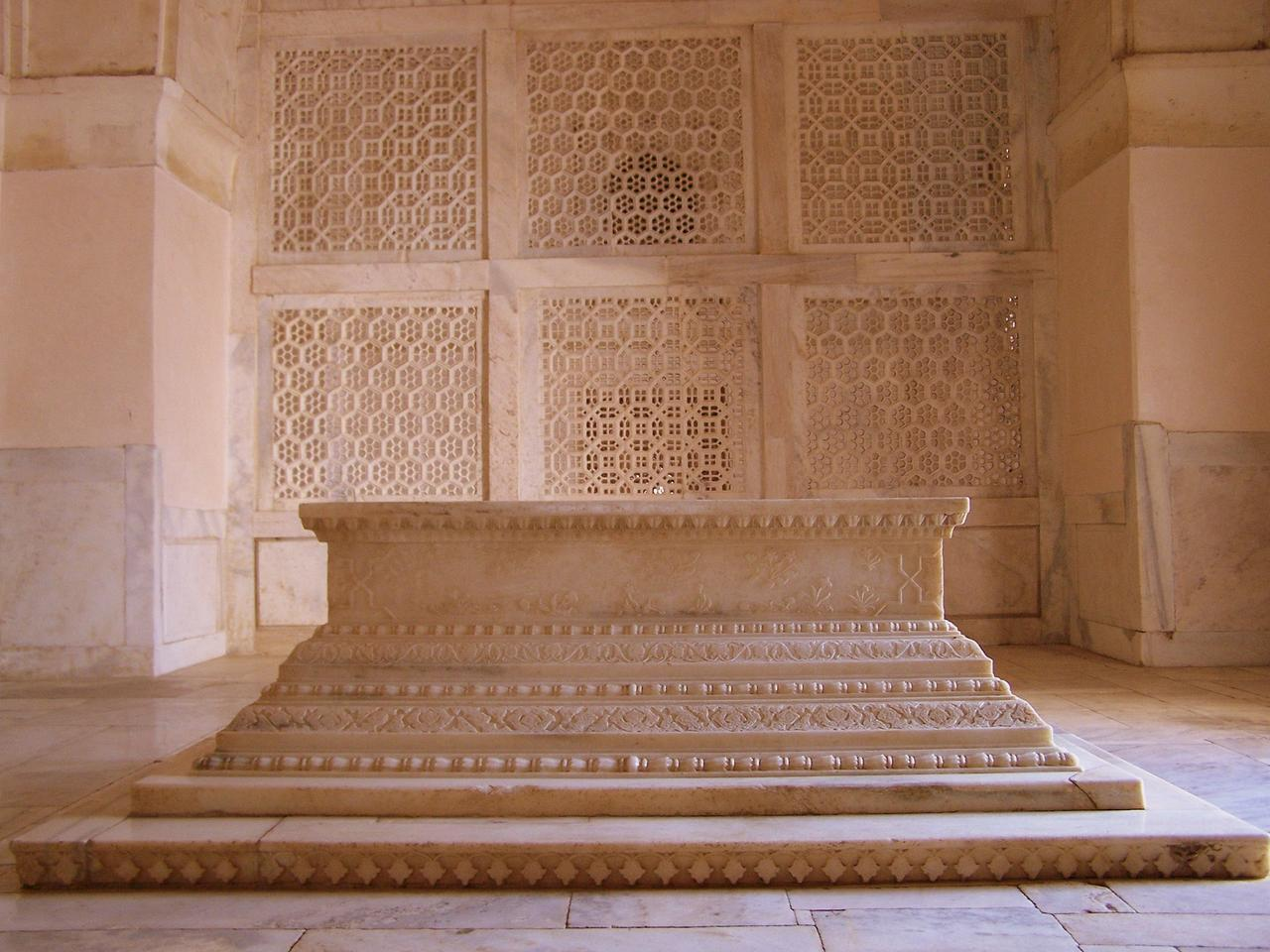
Shakr-un-Nissa's grave.

Shakr-un-Nissa Begum died on 1 January 1653. She had started from Akbarabad towards Shahjahanabad. She was buried in her father's mausoleum, located at Sikandra.
