= Aram Banu Begum =

Mughal princess (1584–1624)

- Shahzadi
- Born: 22 December 1584; Fatehpur Sikri, Agra, Mughal Empire
- Died: 17 June 1624 (aged 39); Mughal Empire
- Burial: Akbar's tomb, Sikandra, Agra
- House: Timurid dynasty
- Father: Akbar
- Mother: Bibi Daulat Shad
- Religion: Sunni Islam

Aram Banu Begum (22 December 1584 – 17 June 1624) was a Mughal princess and the youngest daughter of the third Mughal Emperor Akbar.

== Life ==
Born on 22 December 1584, Aram Banu Begum was the youngest daughter of Akbar and Bibi Daulat Shad. She also had a full sister, Shakr-un-nissa Begum.

She was very outspoken and mischievous. She was called the butterfly of the harem. She was fondly called Ladli Begum ("loved one") by Akbar. She is believed to be quick-witted and sharp at answering back. According to Jahangir, Akbar was extremely fond of her and described her impoliteness as politeness.

Akbar also repeatedly told Jahangir: “Bābā! for my sake be as kind as I am, after me, to this sister, who in Hindi phrase is my darling (that is, dearly cherished). Be affectionate to her and pass over her little impolitenesses and impudences.”

== Death ==
Aram Banu remained unmarried and died during the reign of her brother, Jahangir. She died of dysentery on 17 June 1624.
