= Tomb of Mariam-uz-Zamani =

Tomb of Mughal Empress Mariam-uz-Zamani

Tomb of Mariam-uz-Zamani Begum
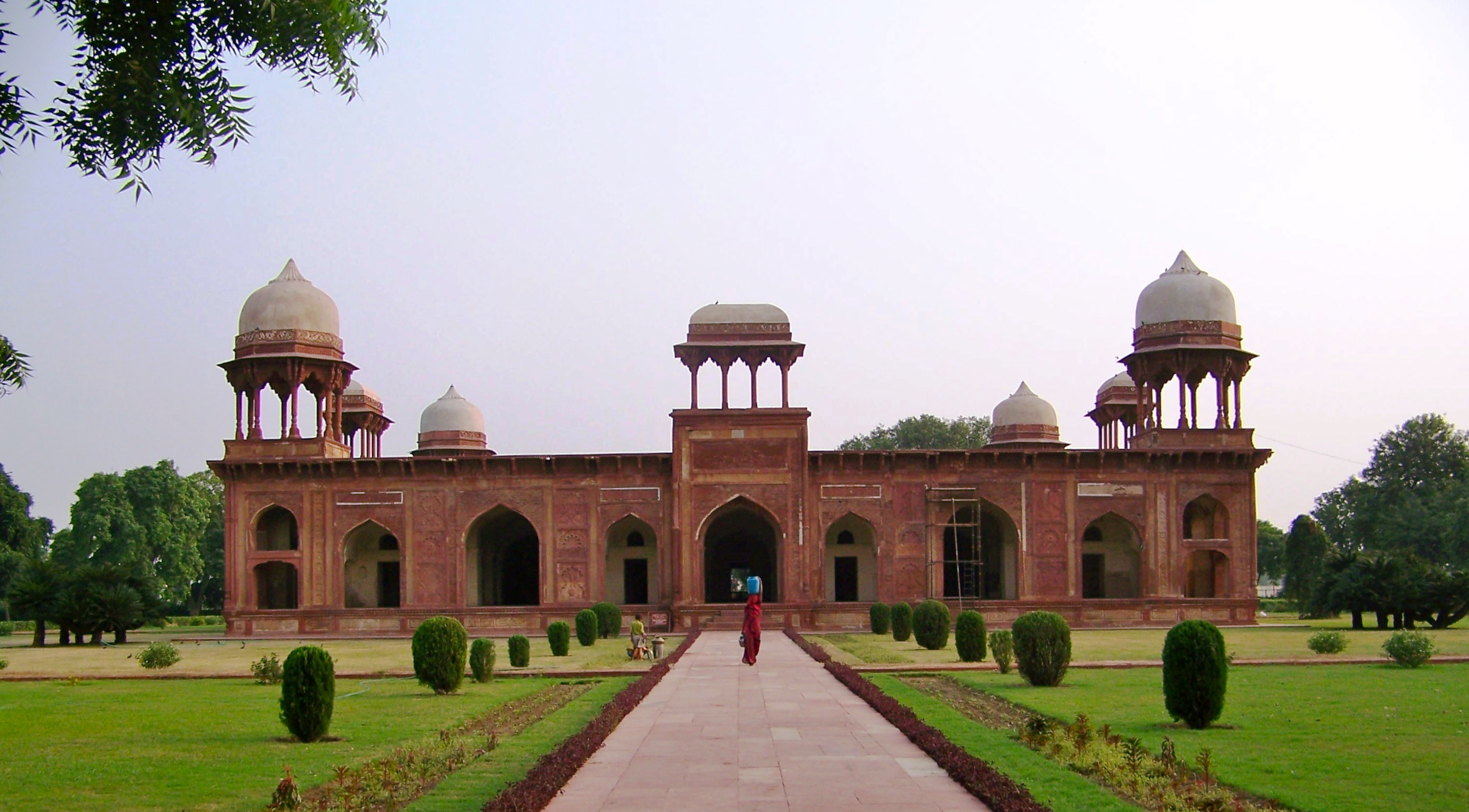
- Tomb of Mariam-uz-Zamani, the favorite and chief consort of Emperor Akbar, in Sikandra, Agra.

Religion
- Affiliation: Islam
- District: Sikandra
- Province: Agra
- Ecclesiastical or organizational status: Tomb
- Leadership: Jahangir
- Year consecrated: 1623

Location
- Location: Sikandra, India
- Interactive map of Tomb of Mariam-uz-Zamani Begum
- Territory: Sikandra
- Coordinates: 27°12′55″N 77°56′34″E

Architecture
- Type: Tomb
- Style: Mughal architecture
- Completed: Before 1627

Specifications
- Direction of façade: Open on four sides
- Length: 145 ft
- Width: 145 ft
- Height (max): 39 ft
- Dome: 8
- Materials: Red Sandstone; Stucco

The Tomb of Mariam-uz-Zamani or Mariam's tomb is the mausoleum of Mariam-uz-Zamani, commonly known by the misnomer Jodha Bai, the favorite wife of the Mughal Emperor Akbar. The tomb was built by her son Jahangir, in her memory between years 1623–1627 and is located in Agra's Sikandra suburb next to Akbar's tomb, in the direction of Mathura. She is the only wife of Akbar to be buried close to him.

== History ==
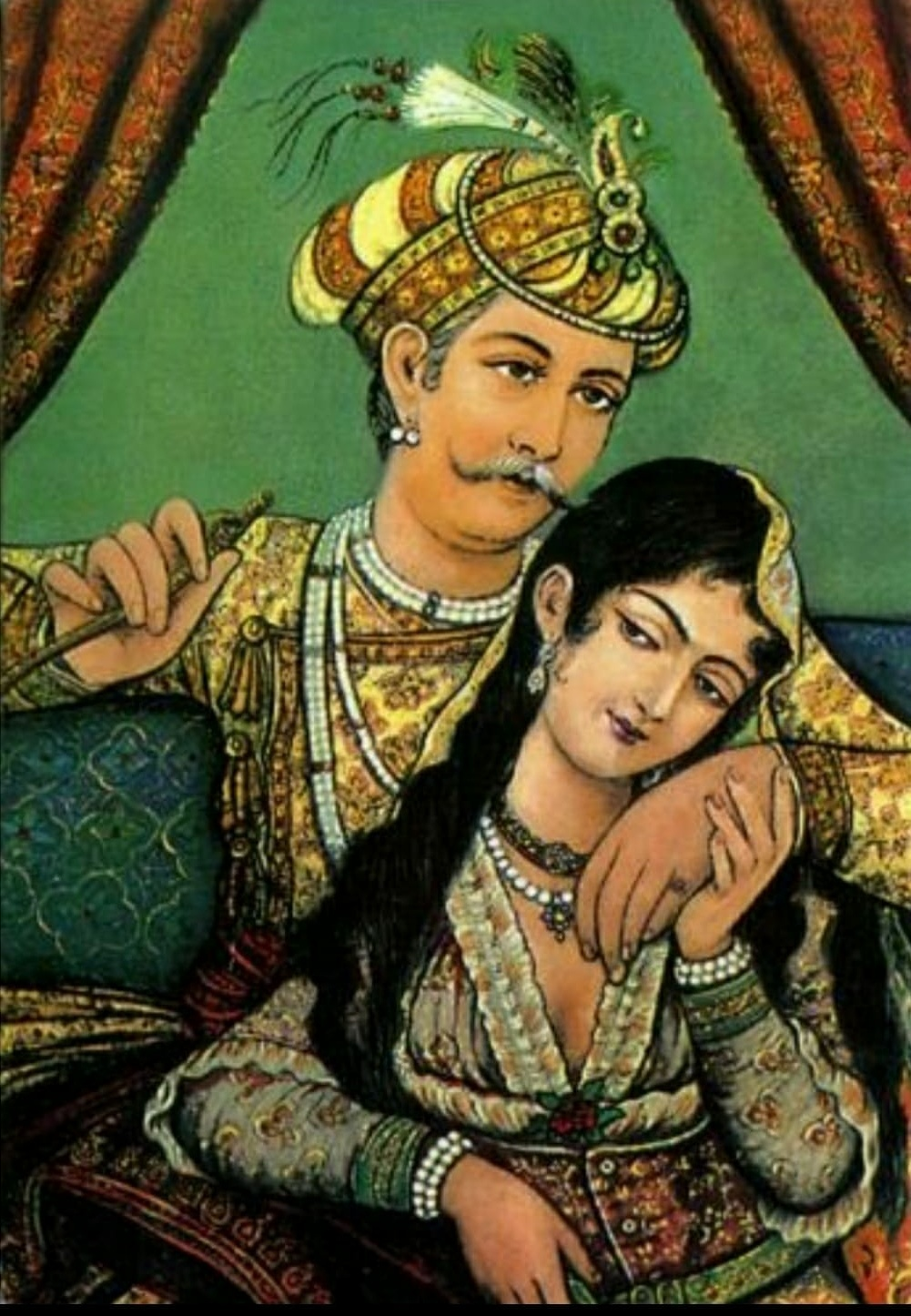
Portrait of Jalaluddin Muhammad Akbar with Mariam-uz-Zamani Begum

Mariam-uz-Zamani was born a Rajput princess named Harkha Bai, the eldest daughter of Raja Bharmal of Amer. She was married to Emperor Akbar in 1562 CE and was honored with the title Mariam-uz-Zamani ('Mary/Compassionate of the Age') after she gave birth to her third son, Jahangir in the year 1569 CE. She died on 19 May 1623 in Agra and was buried close to her husband. There is no concrete evidence stating the reason for her death however it is believed to be because of sickness. Her son Jahangir commissioned a tomb for her between 1623 and 1627 CE. The tomb is just next to the Akbar's tomb, the only nearest of all the tombs of his other wives. She is known to be the first and last love of Emperor Akbar.

Alongside Empress Mariam-uz-Zamani, her granddaughter Bahar Banu Begum is also buried in the same mausoleum insinuating that she might have been her favourite.

== Misidentification as Christian ==
Mariam-uz-Zamani's identity has been throughout centuries falsely inferred as Christian primarily on the pretext of her title, 'Mariam' and the absence of her background details from official Mughal chronicles giving rise to speculation about her race and religion. It was presumed by various writers that since she was named Mariam, she must have been a Christian lady. However Islam reveres Mary or Mariam as their own, in fact, Mariam is the only woman named in their holy book Quran and as per Muslims, she was the greatest woman to ever lived. This signifies the honour bestowed upon the empress and her distinguished rank as Akbar's wife.

According to Edmund Smith, this story was started by some visitors who expressed the idea that the painting in Mariam's house at Fatehpur Sikri represented annunciation and therefore believed that Mariam must have been a Christian, however, the liberal historian of Akbar, Abul Fazl makes no mention of her being Christian or Akbar ever having a Christian wife. Additionally Khulasat-ut-Tawarikh, a chronicle written in the Mughal era, explicitly states Mariam-uz-Zamani as a daughter of Raja Bharmal, therefore putting end to the supposition of Mariam Zamani being a Christian. It was not only that the painting in Sonahra Makan may have led to speculation of her as Christian but the name Maryam (Mary) has also led weight to the theory of "Christian wife" however Maryam is a common name among Muslims and Maryam-uz-Zamani (Mary of Age) was conferred upon her on the birth of her son, prince Salim. For the verification of the assertion of her association with Christianity, Edmund Smith had her crypt opened to find out whether the tomb was that of a Christian lady, but he did not find any trace of the cross.

== Desecration of the Mausoleum ==
This tomb has been damaged heavily by the addition of white plaster during British rule which shadowed the former beauty of the tomb. This mausoleum was used as a printing press for an orphanage centre by Britishers and suffered great damage. Before the mutiny when the High Court was at Agra, the Government Press was situated in her mausoleum and the Native Christian school and Orphanage occupied a portion of the garden. Since the transfer of the government press to Allahabad the whole mausoleum and garden passed into the hands of the native government who put up a large number of partitioned walls inside the mausoleum and established factories there significantly damaging the tomb. The tomb after India-Pakistan partition housed Sindhi refugees and was degraded further.

== Architecture and Ornamentation ==
Mariam-uz-Zamani laid out a large garden near the tomb of her husband in Sikandra, which originally had an open baradari (pleasure pavilion) built during the reign of Sikander Lodi, in 1495 AD. After her death in May 1623, she was buried here near her husband's tomb and the baradari was converted into a fine mausoleum by her son, Jahangir who established a large tomb over her grave by making a crypt below the central compartment and remodelling it substantially with heavy additions of embellishments like frescoes and floral carvings.

Layout of Mausoleum

The mausoleum contains three tombstones: one in the underground mortuary chamber, which is the grave itself; the cenotaph above it; and another cenotaph on the terrace. The ground floor consists of some forty chambers, which bear faint traces of paintings on plastered walls. The center of the ground floor houses the cenotaph of Empress Mariam-uz-Zamani.

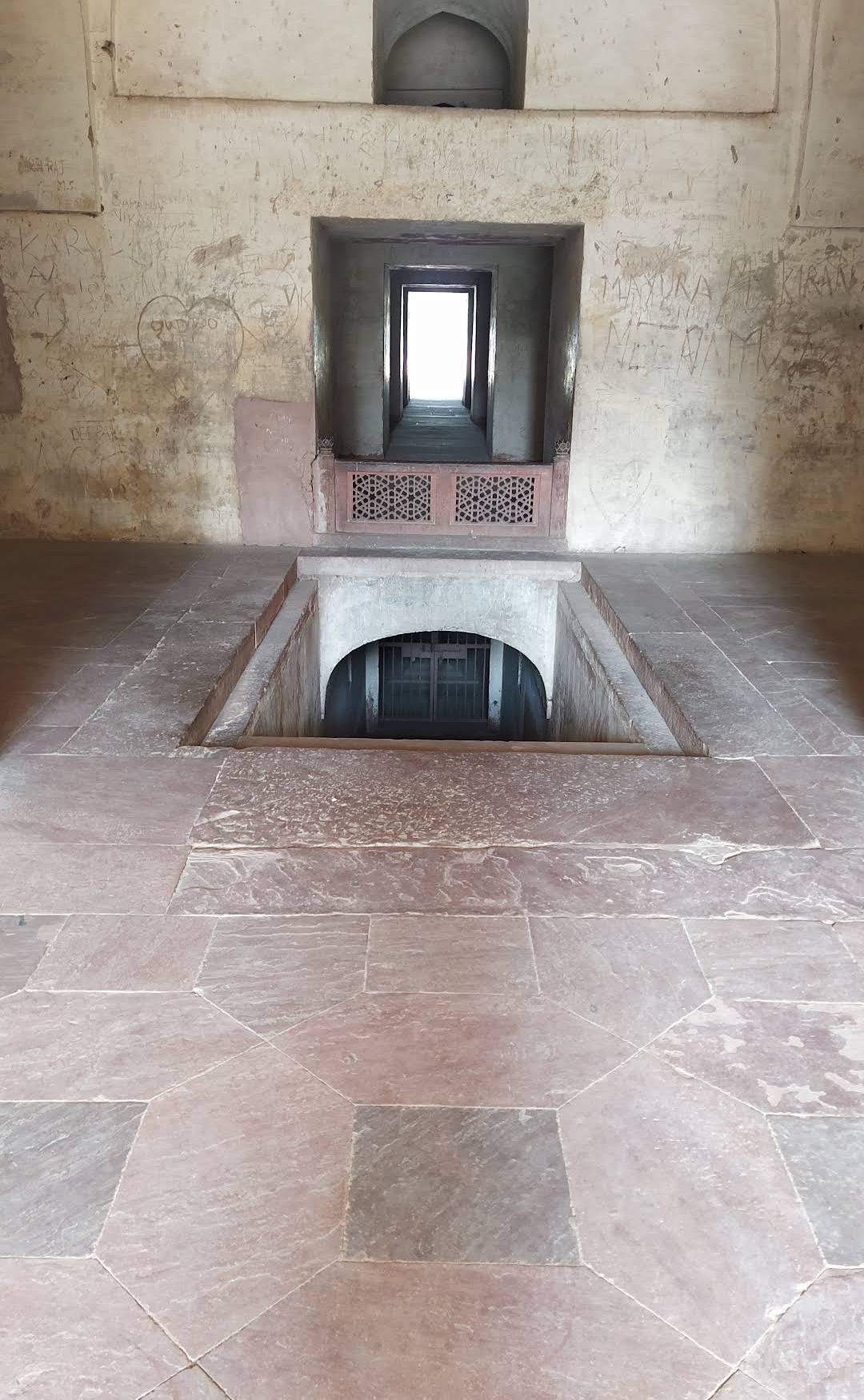
Flight of stairs leading to the grave of Mariam-uz-Zamani Begam

This square tomb stands in the center of the Mughal garden. It is built on a raised platform with stairs on its northern and southern sides. The two corridors running from east to west and from north to south divide the structure into nine sections that are further subdivided into smaller compartments. The largest one is at the center, four smaller square ones at the corners, and four oblong ones in their midst. Massive piers have been used to support the broad arches and vaulted ceilings. The tomb is built of brick and mortar, and finished with stucco.

The baradari was remodelled by Mughals who converted it into the tomb and added chhatris and chhaparkhats. It has four massive octagonal chhatris on its four corners and four oblongs chhaparkhats in the center of the four sides. Each chhatri is made out of red sandstone with a white dome and stands on a square platform. The domes are crowned with an inverted lotus or padma kosha. Brackets have been used to support the internal lintels and external chhajja, five on each pillar, making a total of 40 brackets in one chhatri. Each chhaparkhat is rectangular and has eight pillars with a similar cluster of brackets and a white roof. These chhatris and chhaparkhats are the most important ornament of the whole composition. The rectangular chhaparkhats with eight pillars and a cluster of brackets resemble the corner cupolas. The tomb does not have a dome. The mausoleum is of architectural importance in the category of Mughal tombs without a dome.

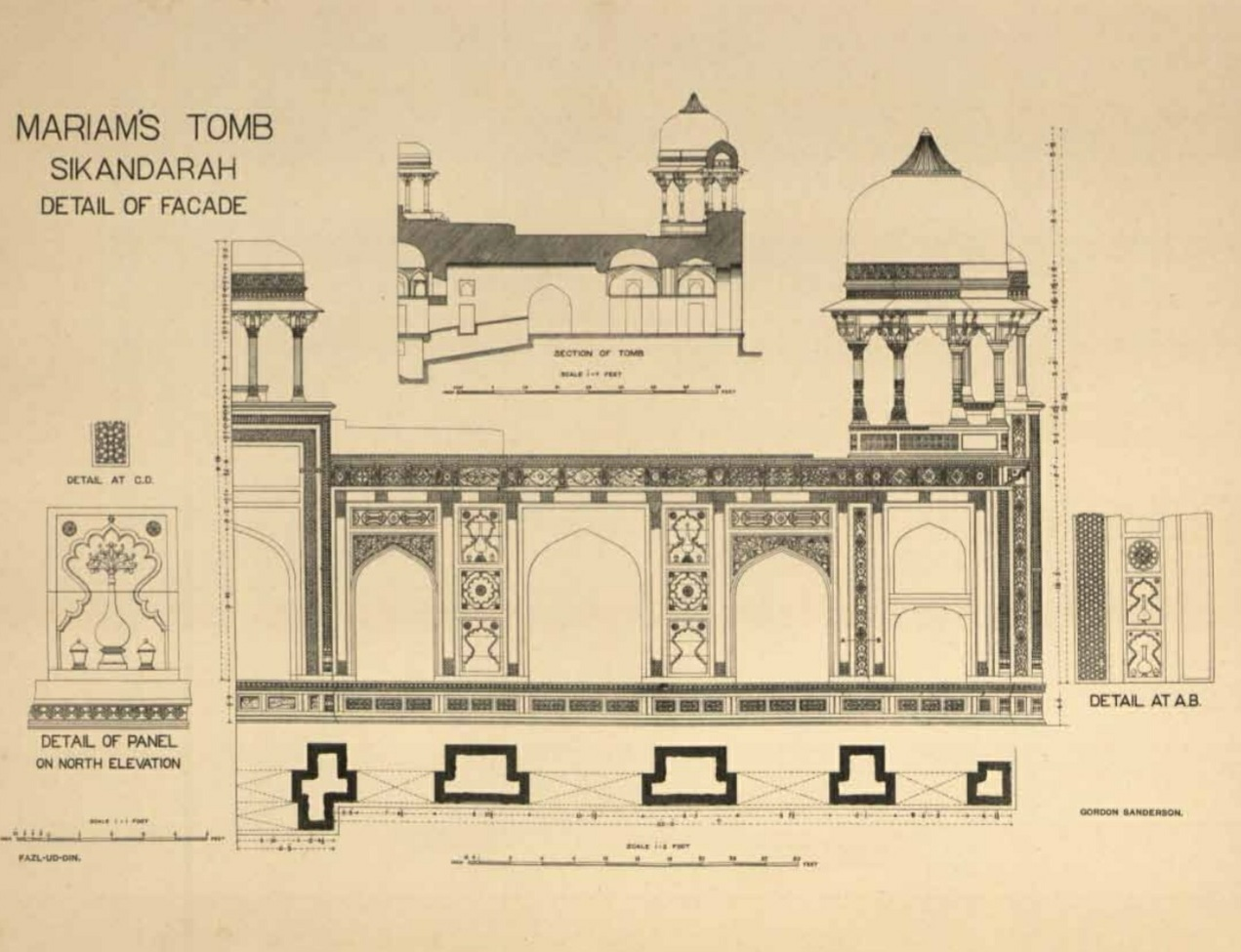
Hindu style detailing on the facade of the tomb

The facades (exterior) of the building were reconstructed with red sandstone panels and a chhajja with the addition of duchhati (mezzanine floors) at the corners by the Mughals. On each facade, there is a rectangular structure which projects forward and has a pointy arch in it. It is flanked on either side by wings, which consist of three arches and a set of double arches, one over the other, thus accommodating a duchhatti at each corner of the building. The wings are protected by chhajjas. The duchhatti are accessible by stairways.

Another important aspect of the tomb is that it is identical both in the front and the rear. Unlike other Mughal era structures, the back entrance is not a dummy but an actual entrance.

The red sandstone facade and panels with a variety of decorative designs, such as floral patterns, tell a lot about the former splendor of this tomb. There are chevron patterns in the nook shafts, wine vases within sunk niches, and geometrical floral designs gracing the piers between the arches. The chhatris have beautifully carved columns with hexagonal bases. The stone brackets occupy the spaces just below the chajja, while beautifully carved friezes are above it. And white marble is inlaid underneath the dome. The friezes of the chhaparkhats were originally covered with glazed tiles and have a pyramidal roof. Traces of floral paintings can still be seen in the corners that tell about the former beauty of the tomb.

== Gallery ==
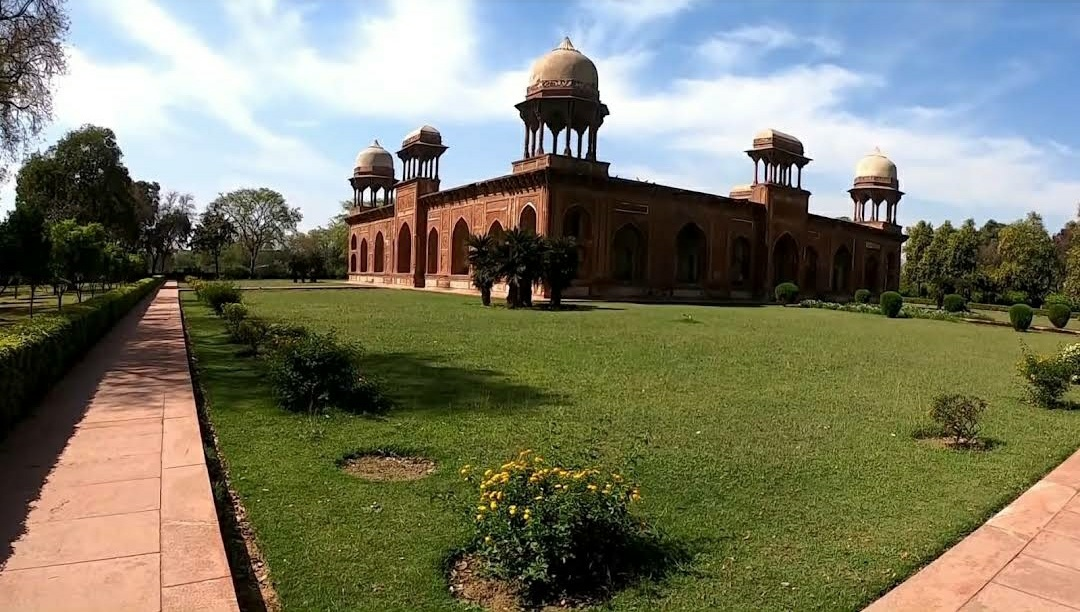
Tomb of Empress Mariam-uz-Zamani build near the Tomb of Akbar

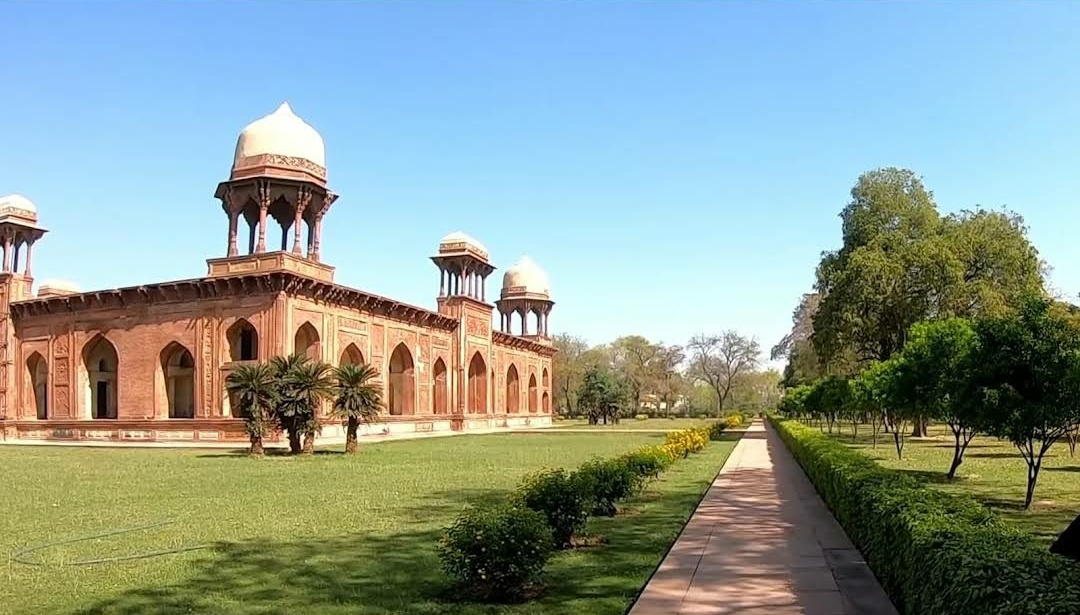
Tomb of Mariam-uz-Zamani in Sikandra, Agra

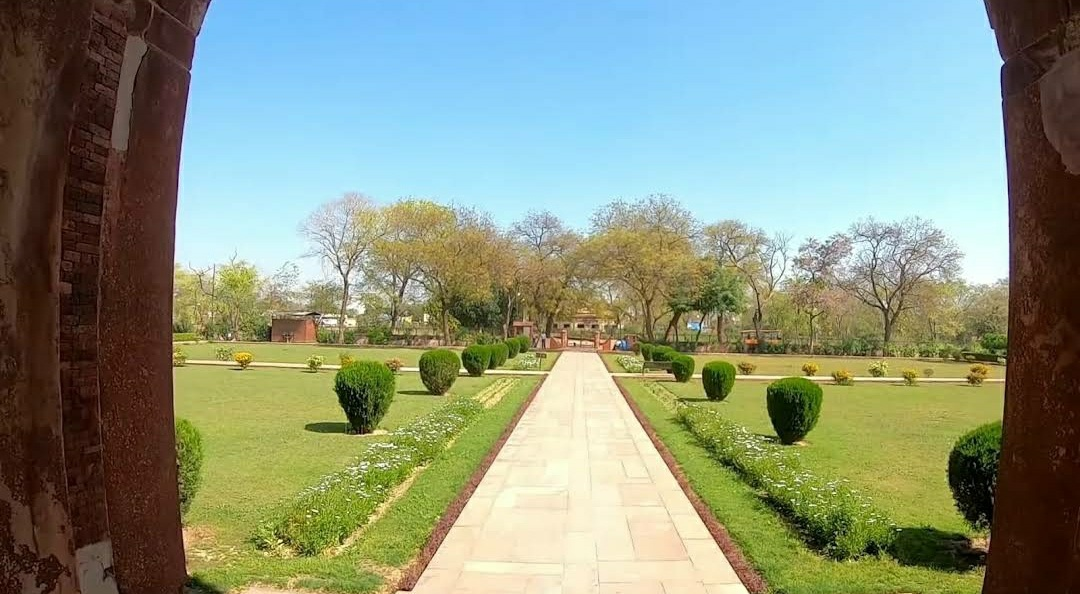
The khiyabans are paved in the beautiful gardens surrounding the Tomb of Mariam-uz-Zamani.

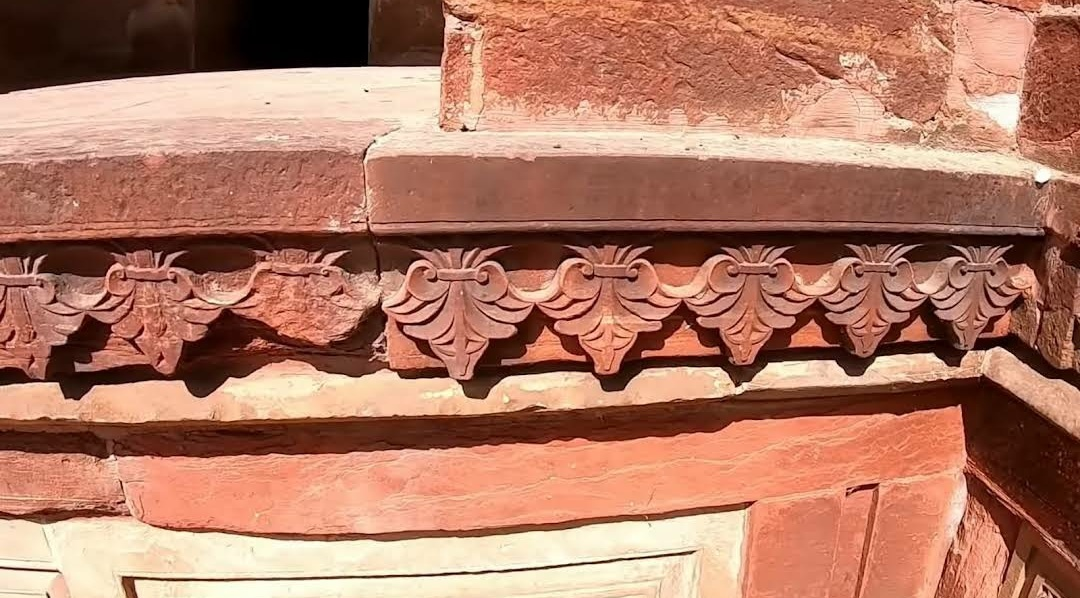
Detailing on the main complex insinuating the former beauty of tomb

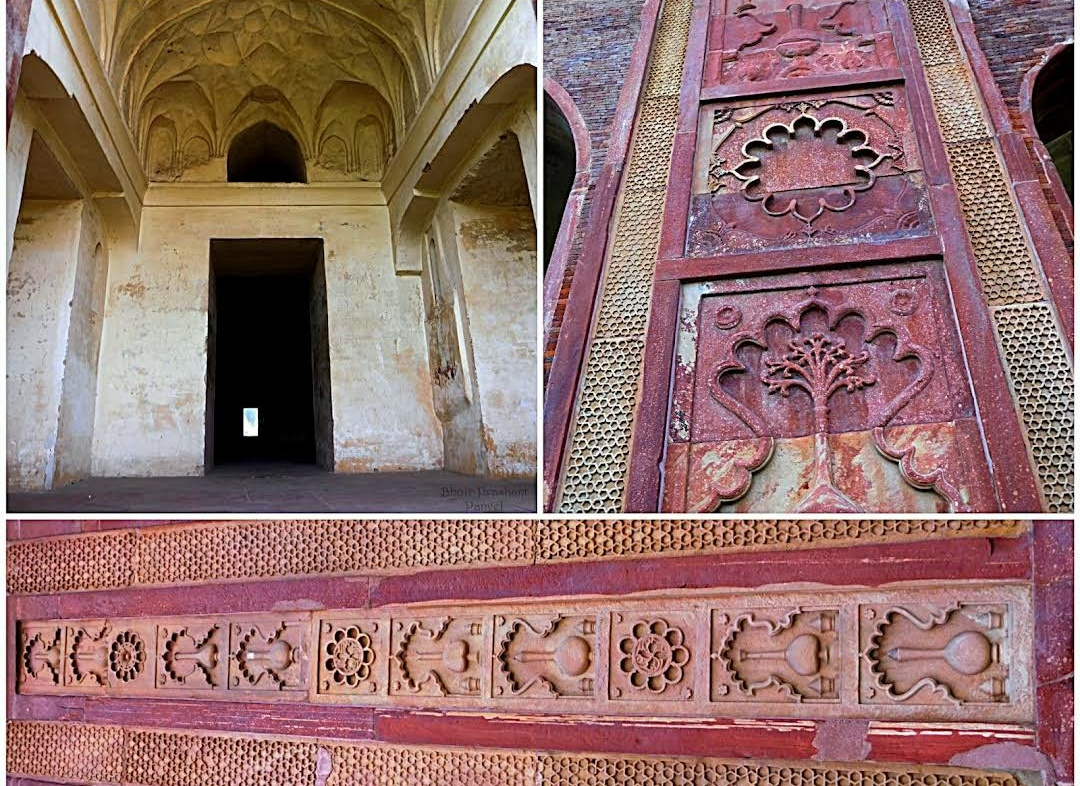
Intricate decorative engravings on the main complex of the tomb

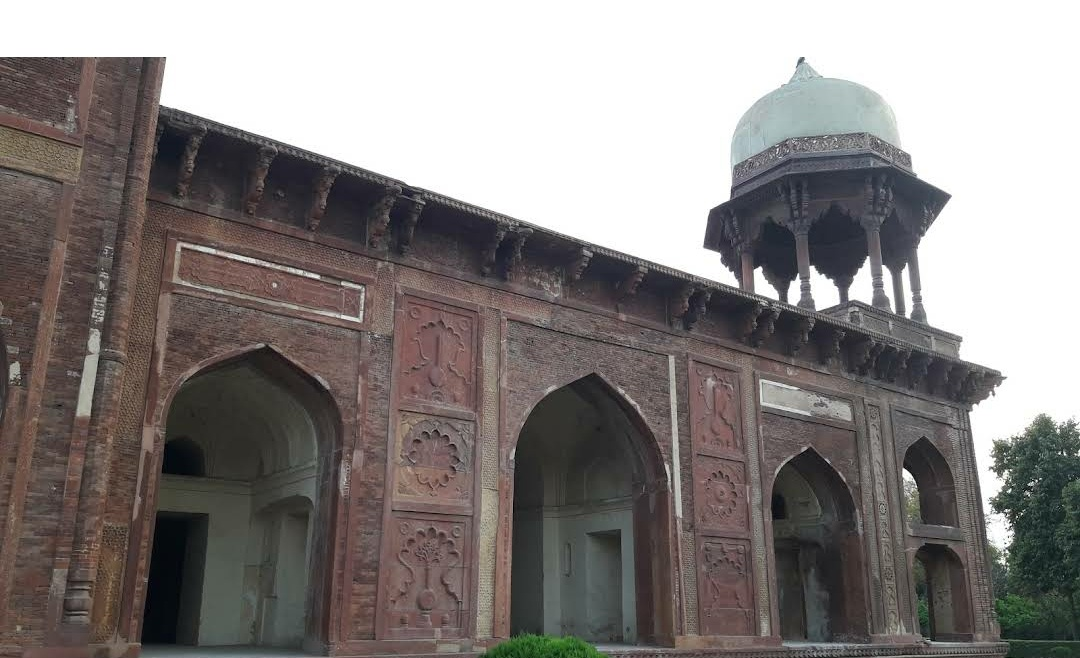
One of the facade's domes visible from the east side of the tomb complex

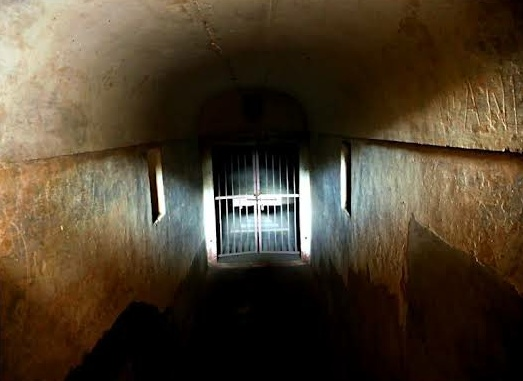
Cenotaph of Mariam-uz-Zamani

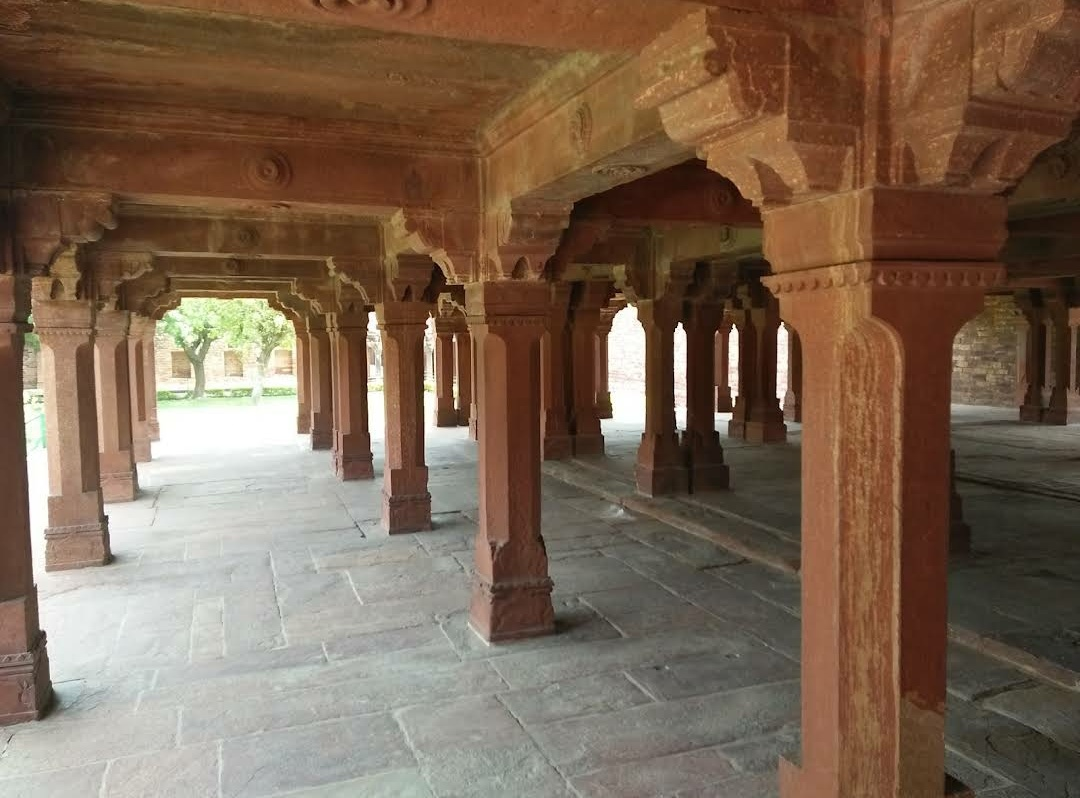
Circumferential gallery around the cenotaph

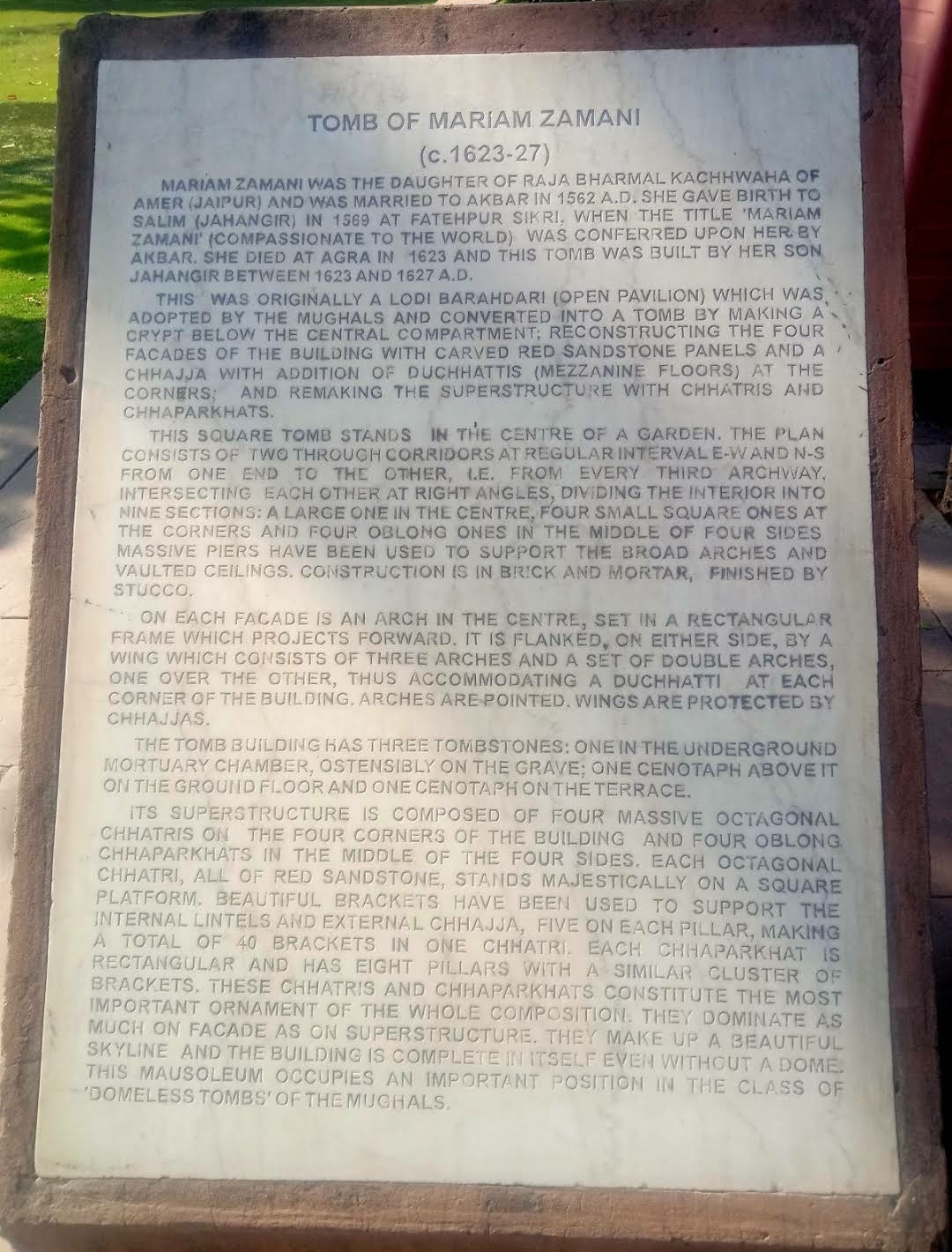
ASI board outside the tomb

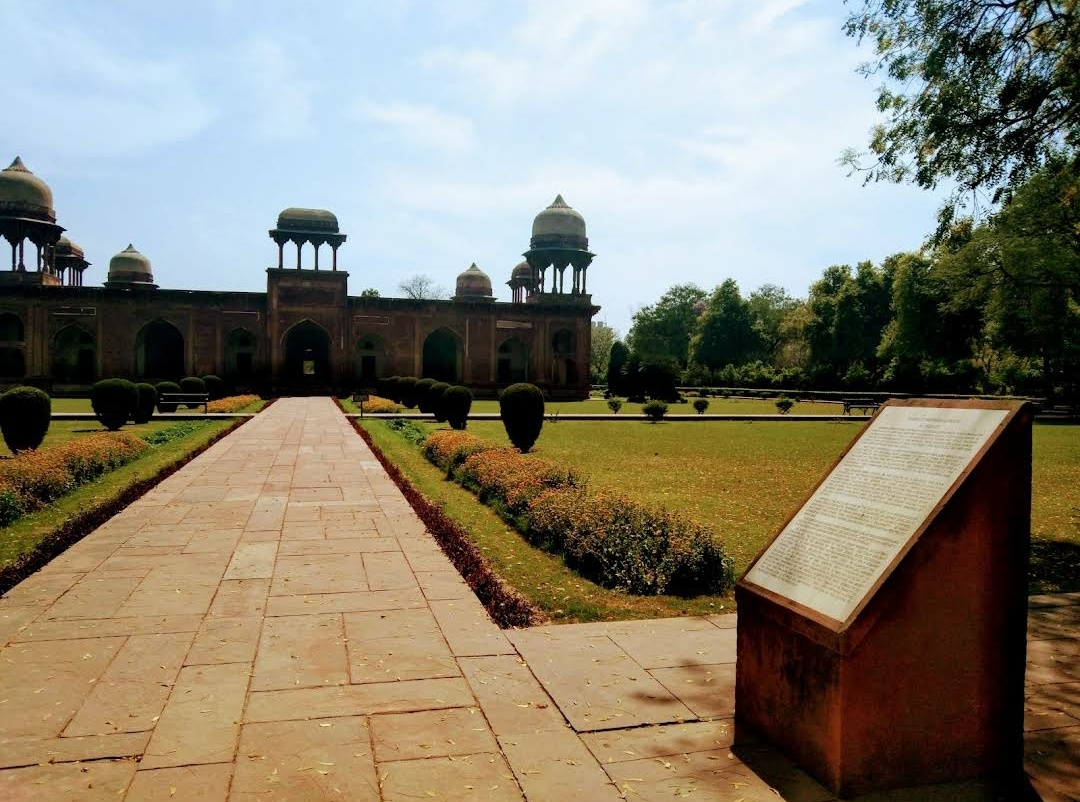
Tomb of Mariam-uz-Zamani

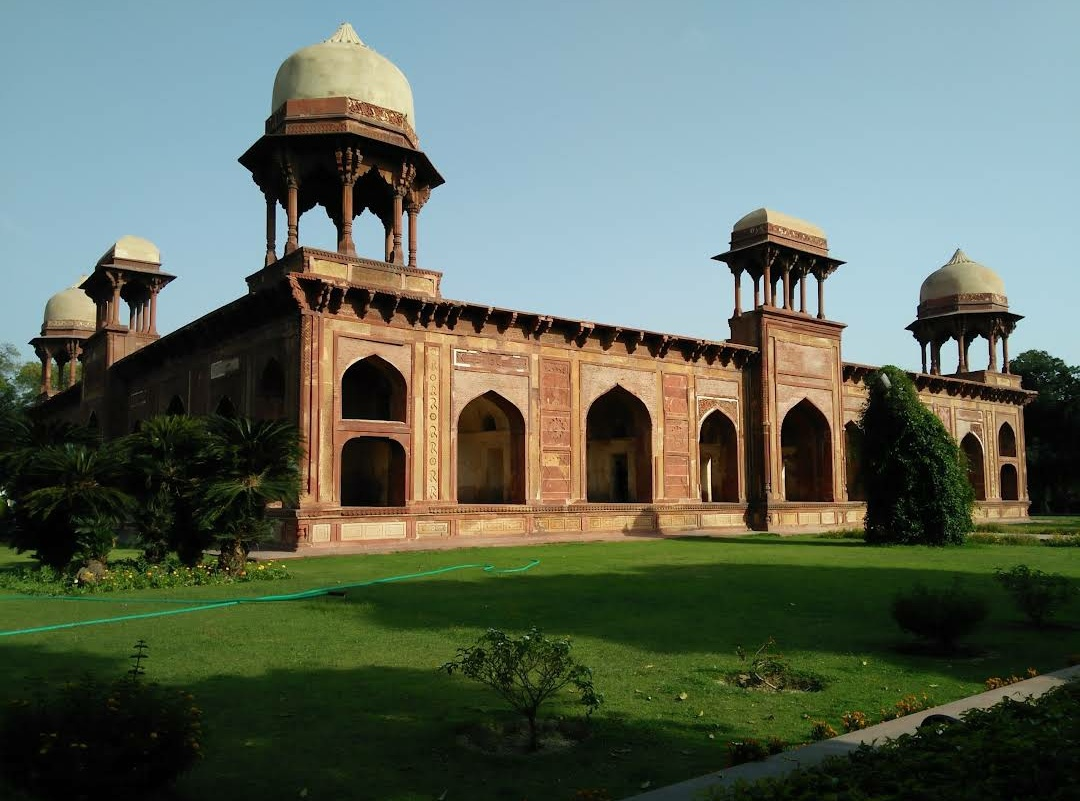
The Tomb Complex of Mariam-uz-Zamani

== See also ==
- Tomb of Jahangir
- Tomb of Akbar the Great, third Mughal Emperor.
- Bibi Ka Maqbara, the tomb of Dilras Banu Begum, consort of Emperor Aurangzeb
