= List of tombs of Mughal Empire =

Tombs of rulers in South Asia

Mughal tombs are a set of tombs built by various ruling in Mughal Emperors. All of them have a marked influence from Iranian Timurid forms. The Mughal dynasty was established after the victory of Babur at Panipat in 1526. During his five-year reign, Babur took considerable interest in erecting buildings, though few have survived. His grandson Akbar built widely, and the style developed vigorously during his reign. Among his accomplishments were Agra Fort, the fort-city of Fatehpur Sikri, and the Buland Darwaza. Akbar's son Jahangir commissioned the Shalimar Gardens in Kashmir. Mughal architecture reached its zenith during the reign of Shah Jahan, who constructed Taj Mahal, the Jama Masjid, the Shalimar Gardens of Lahore, the Wazir Khan Mosque, and who renovated the Lahore Fort. The last of the great Mughal architects was Aurangzeb, who built the Badshahi Mosque, Bibi Ka Maqbara, Moti Masjid, etc.

Mughal architecture, a type of Indo-Islamic architecture developed during the 16th, 17th and 18th centuries throughout the ever-changing extent of their empire in the Indian subcontinent. It developed the styles of earlier Muslim dynasties in India as an amalgam of Islamic, Persian and Indian architecture. Mughal buildings have a uniform pattern of structure and character, including large bulbous domes, slender minarets at the corners, massive halls, large vaulted gateways, and delicate ornamentation; Examples of the style can be found in modern-day Afghanistan, Bangladesh, India and Pakistan.

== Precedents ==
Iltutmish was the first emperor to have a large tomb in the subcontinent. Most of the tombs in the Mughal Empire had marked influence from Iranian Timurid forms. During the period of the Lodis, there were hundreds of tombs built all across the empire. The tombs of nobles were bigger and more elaborate than those of the royals. While the royal tombs were octagonal, one of the nobles ' tombs was square in shape. The square-shaped tombs were followed even during the Mughal tombs until the 18th century. Sher Shah Suri at one time had the largest tomb in India built for himself at Sasaram. The nine bays in the Mughal tombs were replicated from Timurid women's house architecture. Babur, in his memoir, records the numerous memories in Timurid Herat, which inspired him to create the Mughal gardens.

== Mughal tombs ==
Name of the Tomb	Name	year	Photo	Location	Built	Notes/Beliefs
Gardens of Babur	Babur	1483 - 1530		Kabul, Afghanistan34.503°N 69.158°E	1528	The original construction date of the gardens (Persian: باغ, romanized: bāġ) is unknown. When Babur captured Kabul in 1504 from the Arguns, he redeveloped the site and used it as a guest house for special occasions, especially during the summer seasons. Since Babur had such a high rank, he would have been buried in a site that befitted him. The garden where it is believed Babur requested to be buried is known as Bagh-e Babur. Mughal rulers saw this site as significant and aided in further development of the site and other tombs in Kabul. In an article written by the Aga Khan Historic Cities Programme, describes the marble screen built around tombs by Mughal Emperor Shah Jahan in 1638.
Humayun's tomb	Humayun	1508-56		New Delhi, India28°35′35.8″N 77°15′02.5″E	1547	The tomb was commissioned by Humayun's chief consort, Bega Begum. in 1558, and designed by Mirak Mirza Ghiyas and his son, Sayyid Muhammad. Persian architects were chosen by her for the construction of this magnificent tomb. It was the first garden-tomb on the Indian subcontinent,
Akbar's tomb	Akbar	1542 - 1605		Sikandra, Uttar Pradesh, India27°13′13.7″N 77°57′1.7″E	1605-13	It was built in 1605–1613 by his son Jahangir and is situated on 119 acres of grounds in Agra. The tomb is surrounded by a walled enclosure 105 m square. The tomb building is a four-tiered pyramid, surmounted by a marble pavilion containing the false tomb. The true tomb, as in other mausoleums, is in the basement. The buildings are constructed mainly from a deep red sandstone, enriched with features in white marble. Decorated inlaid panels of these materials and black slate adorn the tomb and the main gatehouse. Panel designs are geometric, floral, and calligraphic, and prefigure the more complex and subtle designs later incorporated in Itmad-ud-Daulah's Tomb.
Tomb of Jahangir	Jehangir	1569 - 1627		Lahore, Pakistan31.6225°N 74.3032°E	1627-1637	The mausoleum dates from 1637, and is located in Shahdara Bagh in Lahore, Punjab, Pakistan, along the banks of the Ravi River. The site is famous for its interiors, which are extensively embellished with frescoes and marble, and its exterior, which is richly decorated with pietra dura. The tomb, along with the adjacent Akbari Sarai and the Tomb of Asif Khan, are part of an ensemble currently on the tentative list for UNESCO World Heritage status. The emperor died in the foothills of Kashmir near the town of Rajauri on 28 October 1627. A funeral procession transferred his body from Kashmir and arrived in Lahore on Friday, 12 November 1627.
Taj Mahal	Shah Jahan	1592- 1666		Agra, India27°10′30″N 78°02′31″E	1632–1648	It was commissioned in 1632 by the Mughal emperor Shah Jahan (r. 1628–1658) to house the tomb of his favourite wife, Mumtaz Mahal; it also houses the tomb of Shah Jahan himself. The tomb is the centrepiece of a 17-hectare (42-acre) complex, which includes a mosque and a guest house, and is set in formal gardens bounded on three sides by a crenellated wall. The Taj Mahal was designated as a UNESCO World Heritage Site in 1983 for being "the jewel of Muslim art in India and one of the universally admired masterpieces of the world's heritage". It is regarded by many as the best example of Mughal architecture and a symbol of India's rich history.
Tomb of Aurangzeb	Aurangazeb	1618 - 1707		Ahmednagar, India20°0′18.13″N 75°11′29.04″E	1707	In notable contrast to other Mughal tombs, which are large monuments of Mughal architecture, including the Taj Mahal, at his own direction Aurangzeb is buried in an unmarked grave at the complex of the dargah or shrine of Sheikh Zainuddin. It is located in the south-eastern corner of the complex of the dargah of Sheikh Zainuddin.
Tomb of Mariam-uz-Zamani	Mariam-uz-Zamani	1542-1623		Sikandra, Uttar Pradesh, India27°12′55″N 77°56′34″E	1623-1627	It is the mausoleum of Mariam-uz-Zamani, the favorite and most influential consort of the Mughal Emperor Akbar. The tomb was built by her son Jahangir, in her memory between years 1623-1627 and is located in Sikandra, next to the Akbar's Tomb, in the direction of Mathura. The structure was originally an open baradari (pleasure pavilion) under Sikander Lodi, who built it in 1495 AD. It was adopted by the Mughals in 1623 AD and was converted into a tomb by making a crypt below the central compartment and remodelling it substantially with heavy additions of embellishments like frescoes and floral carvings.
Bibi Ka Maqbara	Dilras Banu Begum	1620-57		Aurangabad, Maharashtra, India19.90151°N 75.320195°E	1668-9	It was commissioned in 1660 by the Mughal emperor Aurangzeb in the memory of his wife Dilras Banu Begum (posthumously known as Rabia-ud-Daurani) and is considered to be a symbol of Aurangzeb's 'conjugal fidelity'. It bears a striking resemblance to the Taj Mahal, the mausoleum of Aurangzeb's mother, Mumtaz Mahal.
Tomb of I'timād-ud-Daulah	Mirza Ghiyas Beg	1576 - 1622		Agra, Uttar Pradesh, India27°11′33″N 78°01′55″E	1622-28	Often described as a "jewel box", sometimes called the "Baby Taj", the tomb of I'timād-ud-Daulah is often regarded as a draft of the Taj Mahal. Along with the main building, the structure consists of numerous outbuildings and gardens. The tomb, built between 1622 and 1628, represents a transition between the first phase of monumental Mughal architecture – primarily built from red sandstone with marble decorations, as in Humayun's Tomb in Delhi and Akbar's tomb in Sikandra – to its second phase, based on white marble and pietra dura inlay, most elegantly realized in the Taj Mahal. The mausoleum was commissioned by Nur Jahan, the wife of Jahangir, for her father, Mirzā Ghiyās Beg, originally a Persian Amir in exile.
Chausath Khamba	Mirza Aziz Koka	1542 - 1624		New Delhi, India28°35′28.7″N 77°14′30.5″E	1623-24	It is located in Nizamuddin precincts of Sufi Muslim shrines and tombs in New Delhi, India. The name means "64 pillars" in Urdu and Hindi. It was built by Mirza Aziz Koka, son of Ataga Khan, as a mausoleum for himself, at the time when Mughal Emperor Jahangir ruled from Delhi. Mirza Aziz Koka had served several times as Jahangir's Governor of Gujarat before he died in Gujarat.
Chini Ka Rauza	Afzal Khan Shirazi	1570 - 1639		Agra, India27°12′03″N 78°02′03″E	1635	It is a funerary monument, rauza in Agra, India, containing the tomb of Afzal Khan Shirazi, a scholar and poet who was the Prime Minister of the Mughal Emperor Shah Jahan. The tomb was built in 1635. The Chini Ka Rauza is situated just 1 kilometre north of Itmad-Ud-Daulah's Tomb, on the eastern bank of the Yamuna River in Agra, and 2 kilometres away from the Taj Mahal. The facade of the monument is also known for its glazed tile work, called Kashi or chini in Mughal-era buildings.
Khusro Bagh	Shah Begum, Khusrau Mirza, Sultan-un-Nissa Begum			Prayagraj, Uttar Pradesh, India25.4423°N 81.8216°E	1622	It is a large walled garden and burial complex located in muhalla Khuldabad close to the Prayagraj Junction railway station, in Prayagraj, India. Situated over forty acres and shaped as a quadrangle, it was primarily built for Shah Begum (born Manbhawati Bai) (d. 1604), Jahangir's chief consort and the daughter of Raja Bhagwant Das and Khusrau Mirza's (d. 1622) mother, by Jahangir. Later, her children were also buried in the same garden: Khusrau Mirza, Jahangir's eldest son and briefly heir apparent to the Mughal throne; and Sultan-un-Nissa Begum (d. 1646), Shah Begum and Jahangir's eldest daughter. It is listed as an Indian Site of National Importance.

* - Mughal Emperors.
