= List of Monuments of National Importance in Allahabad district =

The Archaeological Survey of India has recognized 20 Monuments of National Importance in Prayagraj, Uttar Pradesh.

== List of monuments ==
SL. No.	Description	Location	Address	District	Coordinates	Image
N-UP-L1	Allahabad Fort	Prayagraj		Prayagraj	25°25′48″N 81°52′36″E	Allahabad Fort More images
N-UP-L1-a	Allahabad Fort: Ashoka Pillar (Inscribed stone pillar)	Prayagraj	Near Sangam	Prayagraj		Allahabad Fort: Ashoka Pillar (Inscribed stone pillar)
N-UP-L1-b	Allahabad Fort: Zanana Palace (Rani Mahal)	Prayagraj		Prayagraj		Upload Photo
N-UP-L2	Cemeteries in Kydganj	Prayagraj		Prayagraj		Cemeteries in Kydganj
N-UP-L3	Khusru Bagh	Prayagraj	Lukerganj	Prayagraj		Khusru Bagh More images
N-UP-L3-a	Khusru Bagh: Enclosure wall and Gateway of Khusru Bagh	Prayagraj		Prayagraj	25°26′41″N 81°49′19″E	Khusru Bagh: Enclosure wall and Gateway of Khusru Bagh
N-UP-L3-b	Khusru Bagh: Tomb of Bibi Tamolan	Prayagraj		Prayagraj	25°26′33″N 81°49′11″E	Khusru Bagh: Tomb of Bibi Tamolan
N-UP-L3-c	Khusru Bagh: Tomb of Sultan Khusru	Prayagraj		Prayagraj	25°26′32″N 81°49′20″E	Khusru Bagh: Tomb of Sultan Khusru
N-UP-L3-d	Khusru Bagh: Tomb of Sultan Khusru's Mother (Shah Begum, born Manbhawati Bai)	Prayagraj		Prayagraj	25°26′32″N 81°49′15″E	Khusru Bagh: Tomb of Sultan Khusru's Mother (Shah Begum, born Manbhawati Bai)
N-UP-L3-e	Khusru Bagh: Tomb of Sultan Khusru's Sister	Prayagraj		Prayagraj	25°26′32″N 81°49′18″E	Khusru Bagh: Tomb of Sultan Khusru's Sister
N-UP-L4	Queen Victoria Memorial in Alfred park	Prayagraj	Civil lines	Prayagraj		Queen Victoria Memorial in Alfred park
N-UP-L5	Small high mound, the ancient site of a large Hindu Temple	Bara		Prayagraj		Upload Photo
N-UP-L6	The area of the waste land divided by a ravine into two large mounds called "Garha and Garhi"	Bhita	Bara tehsil	Prayagraj		Upload Photo
N-UP-L7	Large stone dwelling house said to have been the residence of the two heroes of udal and Alha almost 8th century AD (बड़े पत्थर के निवास के घर में लगभग 8 वीं शताब्दी ऊदल और आल्हा दो नायकों का निवास था।)	Chilla	Bara tehsil	Prayagraj		Upload Photo
N-UP-L8	Standing figure identified by Fuhrer as Buddha Asvaghosha with a five-headed snake canopy and worshipped under the name of Srigari Devi	Deora, Bara tehsil	Near Bhita	Prayagraj		Upload Photo
N-UP-L9	A rocky hall on the south face of the top bearing an inscription of three lines of Indo-Scythian period in red paint with some rude drawings of men and animals	Ginja Hill	Bara	Prayagraj		Upload Photo
N-UP-L10	Ruined forts of Samudra Gupta and Hansagupta	Jhusi or pra	Phulpur	Prayagraj		Upload Photo
N-UP-L11	Cave known as Sita-ki-rasoi containing an inscription in characters of the 9th century AD	Mankuar		Prayagraj		Upload Photo
N-UP-L12	Extensive mound called Hatgauha Dih	Shivpur	Soraon tehsil	Prayagraj		Upload Photo
N-UP-L13	Garhwa Fort	Sheorajpur		Prayagraj		Garhwa Fort
N-UP-L14	Large mound called Surya Bhita	Shringaverpur	Soraon	Prayagraj		Upload Photo
