= Sarai Amanat Khan =

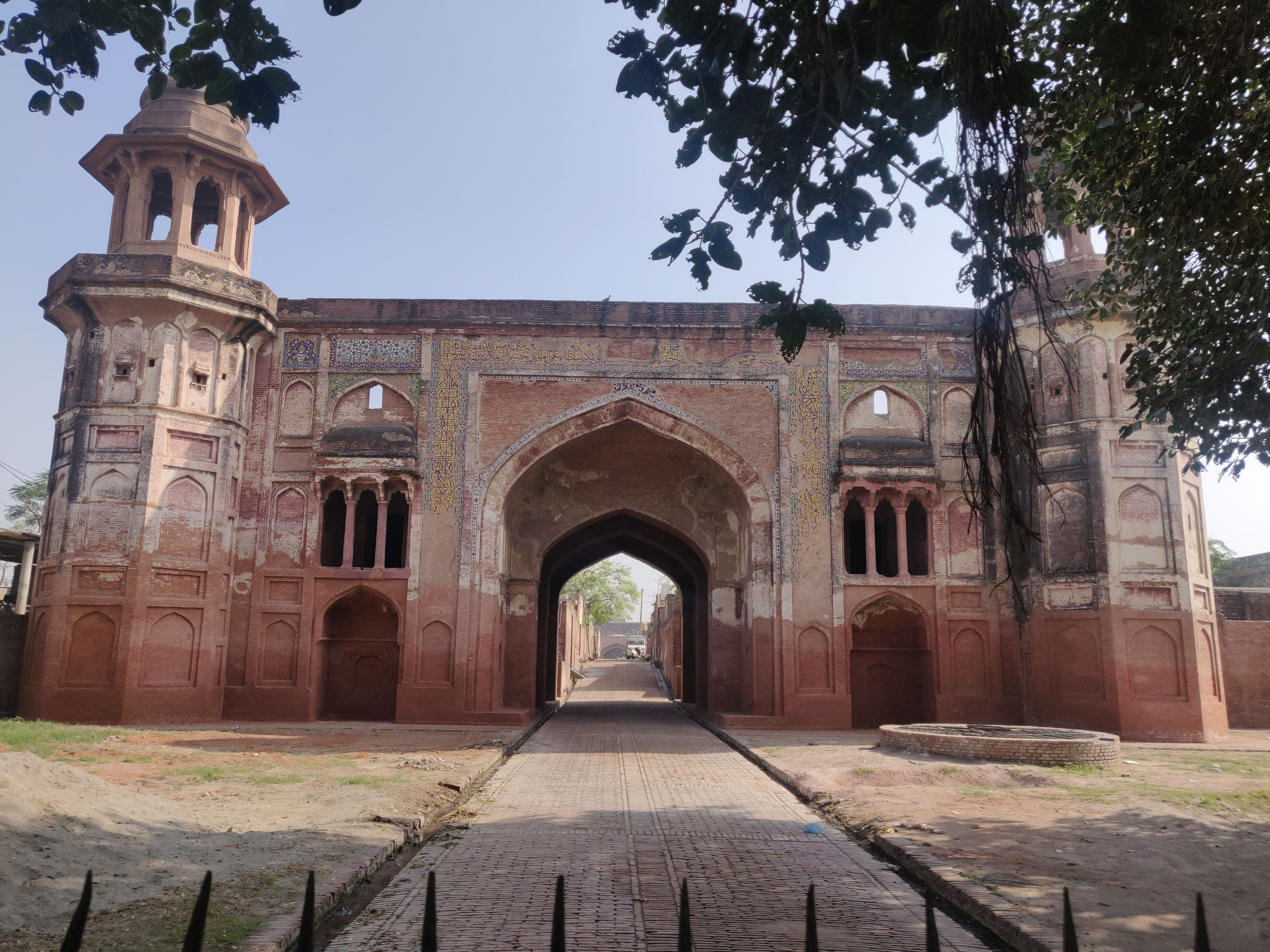

General information
- Architectural style: Mughal
- Location: India
- Coordinates: 31°30′39″N 74°41′35″E

Sarai Amanat Khan is a caravanserai located in the Indian state of Punjab. Built in the 16th century, it was commissioned by Amanat Khan, who was a Mughal nobleman and calligrapher known for his work on the Taj Mahal.

The sarai is located on the highway between Agra and Lahore, and was intended to provide shelters to travelers along the route. Its neighboring sarai was Sarai Khan Khana which was built by Abdul Rahim Khan-i-Khanan in Manhala, a town near Lahore. A mosque and a well are located within the sarai. A tomb, presumably containing the remains of Amanat Khan, is located nearby. It is listed as a monument of national importance.

== Background ==
A caravanserai (or sarai) is a type of roadside inn, providing accommodation for travelers and caravans. During the reign of the Mughal empire, several sarais were built at regular intervals along the major highways of the empire. The Sarai Amanat Khan is located on the medieval highway (now little-used) between Agra and Lahore.

According to the foundation inscription located on the western gateway, the sarai (roadside inn) was commissioned by Amanat Khan Shirazi, in the year 1050 Hijri (1640–41 CE). He was a nobleman and a calligrapher known for his work on the Taj Mahal, and since the text of the inscription is given in the first person, it is assumed that Amanat Khan himself was the scribe.

Amanat Khan's brother Afzal Khan had died in 1639. According to a contemporary source, Amanat Khan was so grief-stricken upon his brother's death, that he gave up courtly life, and retired in a village where he constructed a sarai, within which he was buried. This leads to the assumption that the sarai was intended to be a memorial to Afzal Khan. However, the inscription makes no reference to Afzal Khan. Nonetheless, the inheritance from his brother in addition to his own stipend may have provided Amanat Khan with enough funds to construct the monumental building.

In 1928, it was listed as a monument of national importance. As of 2017, the sarai has been encroached illegally, and several houses have been constructed within its precincts.

== Description ==
It is located on the highway between Agra and Lahore, and was intended to provide shelters to travelers along the route. The sarai enclosure is almost square, measuring 168 meters in length and 165 meters in breadth. An octagonal bastion, with a side of 1.6 meters is situated on each corner. Semi-octagonal bastions are also provided in the middle of the northern and southern sides.

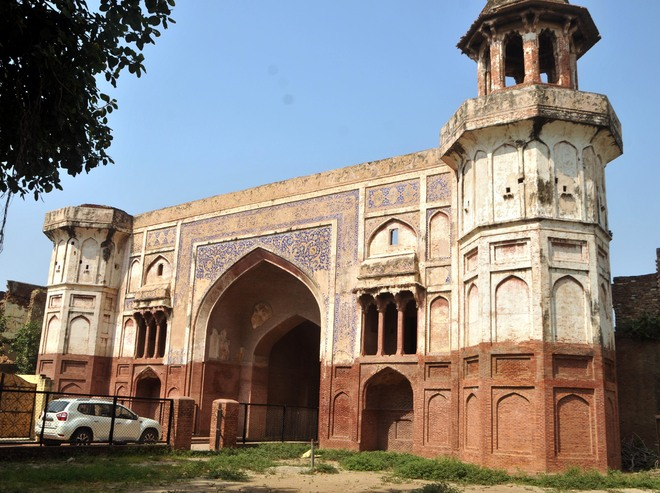
One of the monumental gateways

The center of the eastern and western sides features monumental gateways. The facade of each gateway measures 19.8 meters in length, and is flanked on either side by an octagonal bastion, with a side of 1.8 meters, topped with a chhatri. Each gateway has an entrance arch in the middle, with a span of 6.6 meters. This arch leads to a passage, with a deep veranda on each side, leading to a room. A staircase in either side of the gateway leads to the first floor, which has two rooms on each side. Once again, two staircases provide access to the roof. All the rooms of the gateways have vaulted ceilings.

The spandrels of the entrance arch are decorated with Arabesque designs formed by colorful glazed tiles. Two panels frame the entrance arch, containing inscriptions by Amanat Khan, executed in blue and yellow glazed tiles. The entrance arch is flanked by a deep niche with a span of 1.2 meters. Above this niche is a story of triple openings. These openings were originally adorned with jali screens. Square and rectangular panels, depicting flower-and-vase motifs are also found on the facade of the gateways, as well as the bastions.

The number of rooms in the sarai is not known. The courtyard is filled with encroachments, and only a few of the original rooms have survived. However, each room is 3.5 meters square, and has a vaulted ceiling. A well, with a diameter of 2 meters, is situated within the sarai. Another well is located outside, near the western gateway.

A mosque is situated in the southern half of the courtyard. The mosque measures 16.2 × 7.9 meters, and is surmounted by three domes. Its facade consists of three arched entrances, and was originally decorated with glazed tiles, of which only traces survive. The western wall of the mosque contains three mihrabs (prayer-niches). An inscription carved in stucco is provided above each mihrab. About eight hundred feet south of the eastern gateway is a tomb. While the tomb contains no inscription, it may be inferred from its style of construction that it was contemporary with the sarai. The tomb might be the place of burial of Amanat Khan, and may have been constructed by his son.
