= Chini Ka Rauza =

Monument in India

Chini ka Rauza
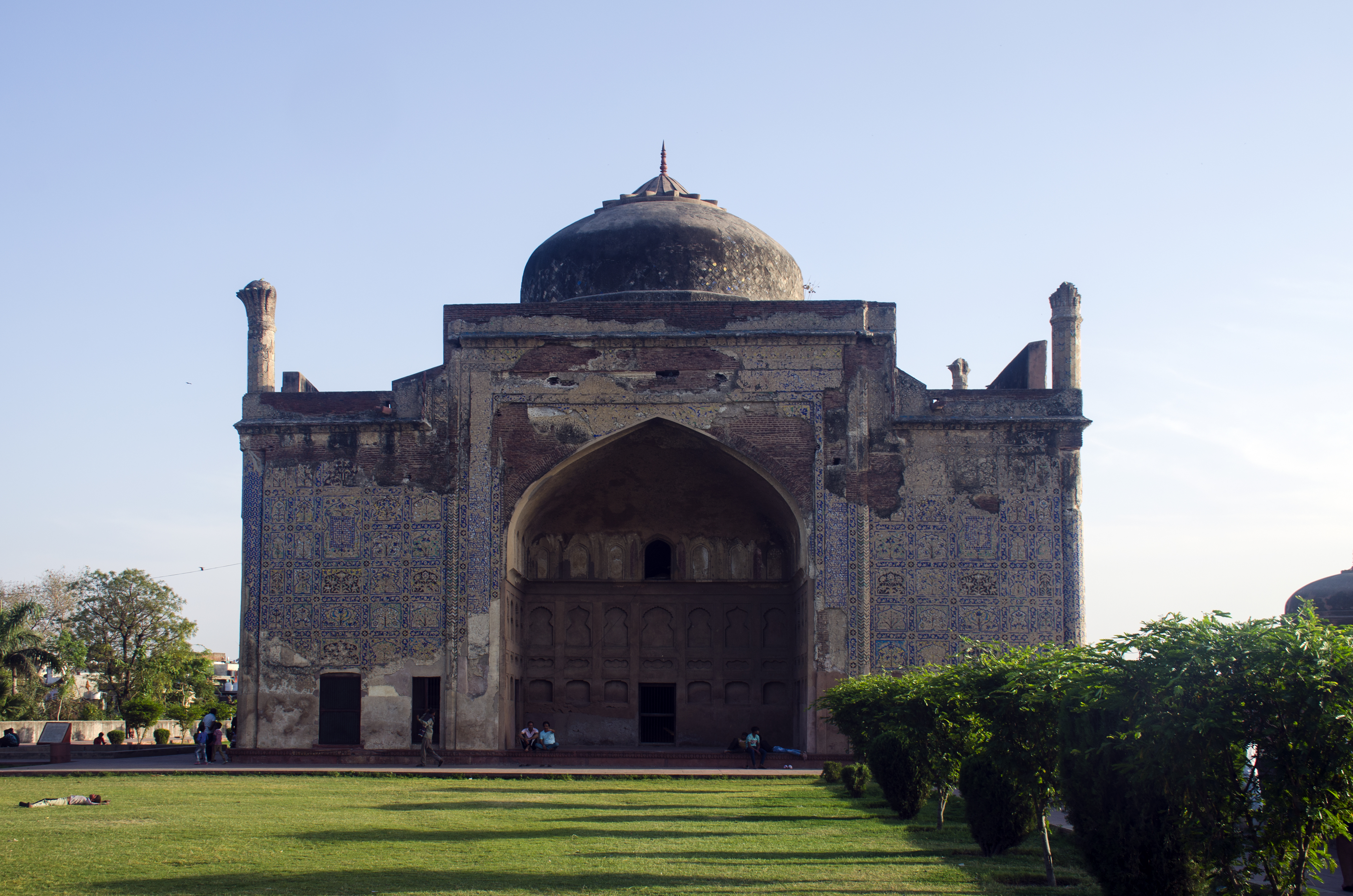
- Façade of Chini ka Rauza, in 2024
- Interactive map of Chini ka Rauza
- 27°12′3.08″N 78°2′3.78″E
- Type: Mausoleum
- Location: Katra Wazir Khan, Agra, India

History
- Built: 1635; 391 years ago
- Built for: Afzal Khan Shirazi

Site notes
- Architectural style: Mughal architecture

Monument of National Importance

Chini ka Rauza is a funerary monument, rauza in Agra, India, containing the tomb of Afzal Khan Shirazi, a scholar and poet who was the Grand Vizier of the Mughal Emperor Shah Jahan. The tomb was built in 1635. The Chini Ka Rauza is situated just 1 kilometre north of Itmad-Ud-Daulah's Tomb, on the eastern (left) bank of Yamuna river in Agra, and 2 kilometres away from the Taj Mahal.

The outer walls of the monument is decorated with glazed tile and hence the name Chini ka Rauza (the word chini coming from "China" and rauza from the Persian for "tomb").

== History ==
Also known as China Tomb, this is the mausoleum of Afzal Khan who was a Persian poet during the reign of Jahangir. Later he became the wazir during Shah Jahan's reign. Khan died in Lahore in 1639 and was buried at Agra. The tomb is built facing the city of Mecca.

The tomb has been recognised as a Monument of National Importance.

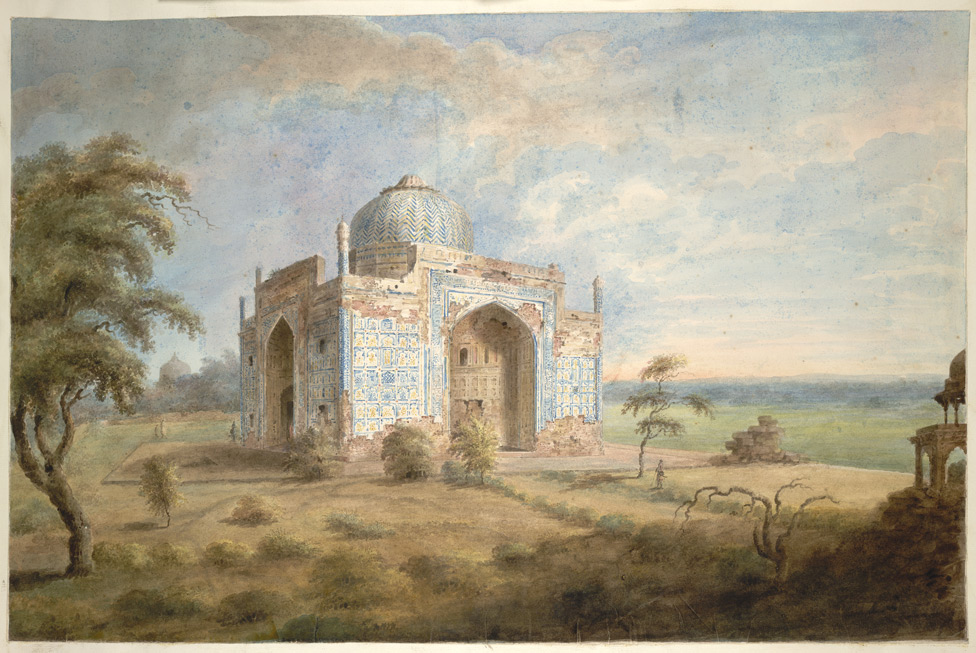
The tomb as it looked in a watercolor from the early 19th century.

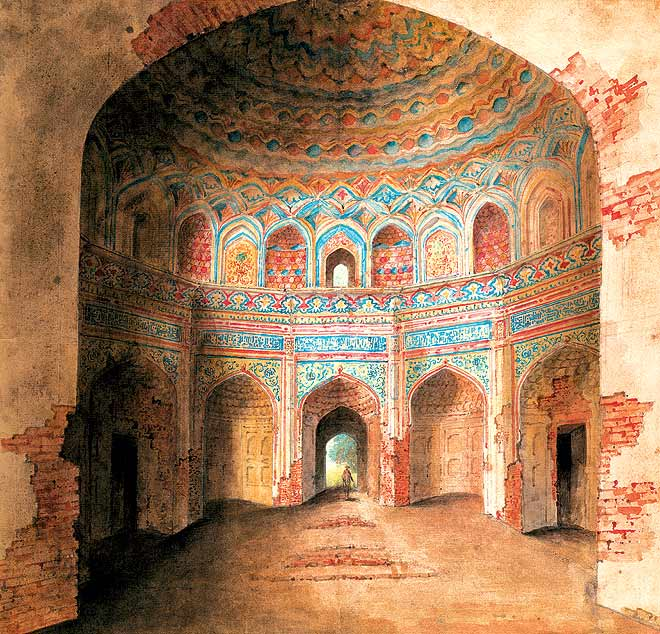

== Architecture and decoration ==
The structure's architectural style is unusual because of the exotic architectural style and is unusually plain possessing a sultanate style unproportional dome.

Due to the inclement weather, the various enamel colours have worn away from the tiles. In the facades, the builders used earthenware pots to reduce the weight of the concrete filling which was followed in Rome and Egypt.

The interior houses two graves (Afzal Khan and his wife) along with brightly painted walls and ceilings. It stands in the centre of a Charbagh styled garden overlooking the Yamuna.

In the central chamber of the tomb there are Quranic inscriptions. University of Minnesota researcher Catherine B. Asher has written that these "were clearly executed by a master artist". Afzal Khan's brother, Amanat Khan, was a calligrapher in the court of Shah Jahan and was in charge of inscriptions for the Taj Mahal. Although the inscriptions at Chini Ka Rauza are not signed, Asher concludes that they are the work of Amanat Khan.

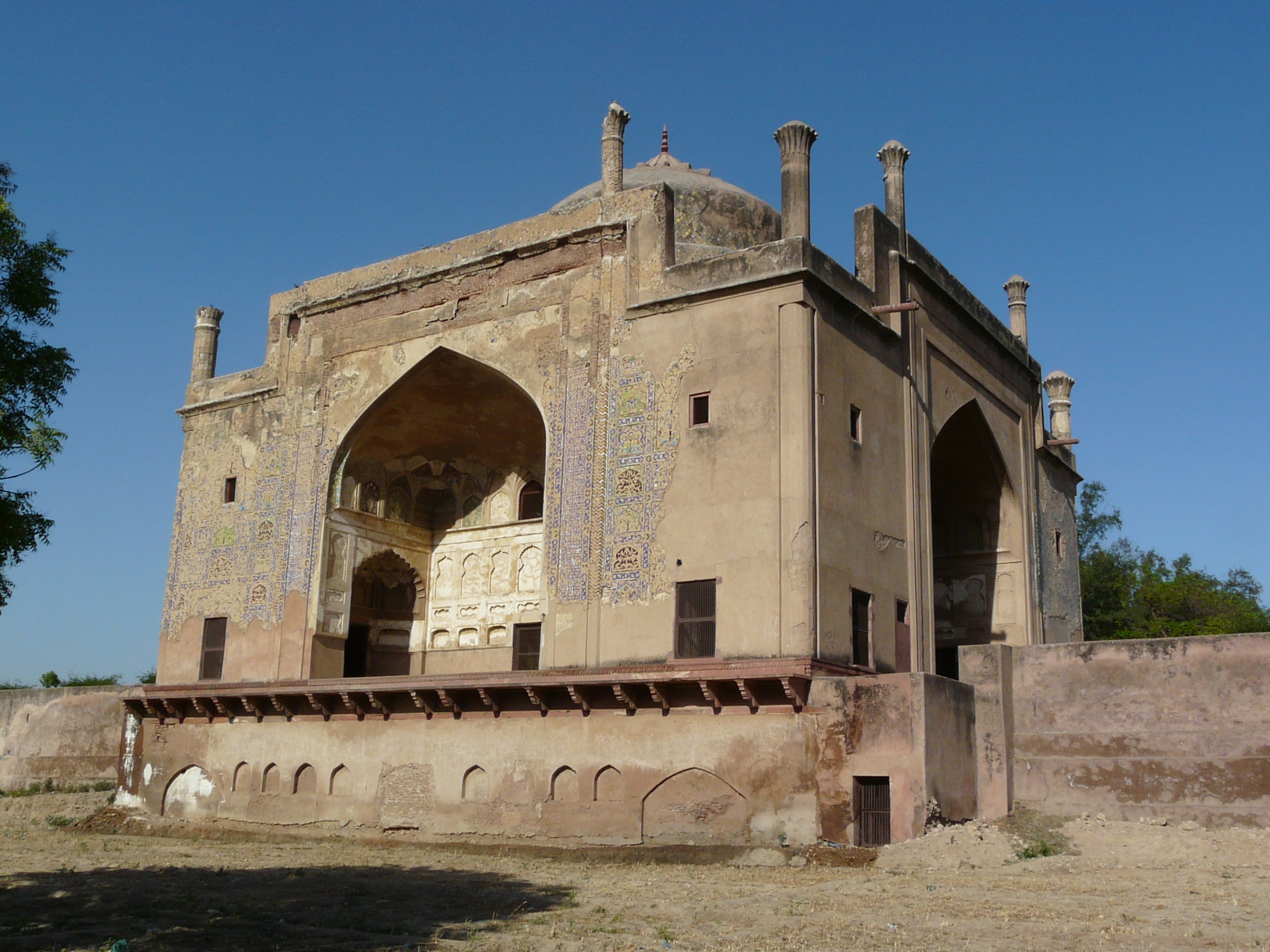
Chini ka Rauza, Agra

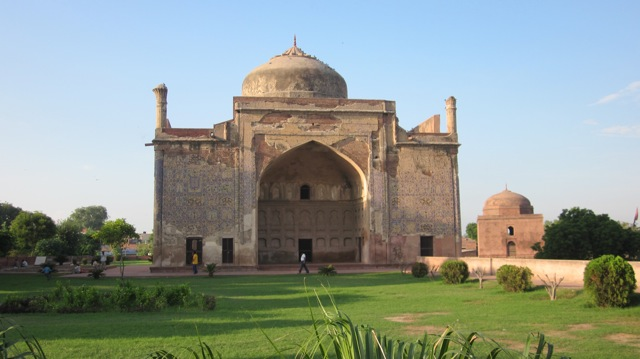
Chini Ka Rauza, in Agra

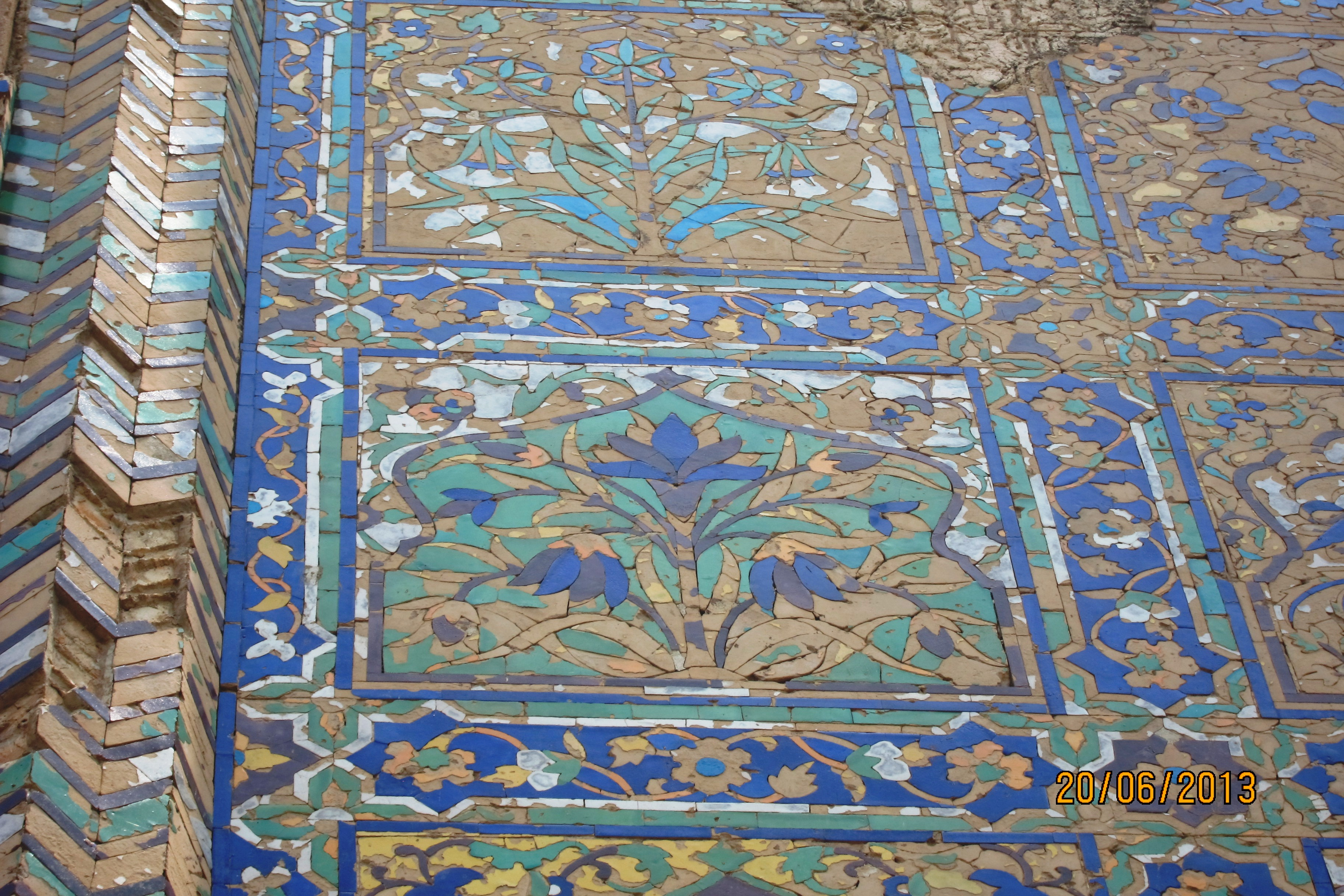
Damaged yet intricate pietra dura inlay work at Chini Ka Rauza

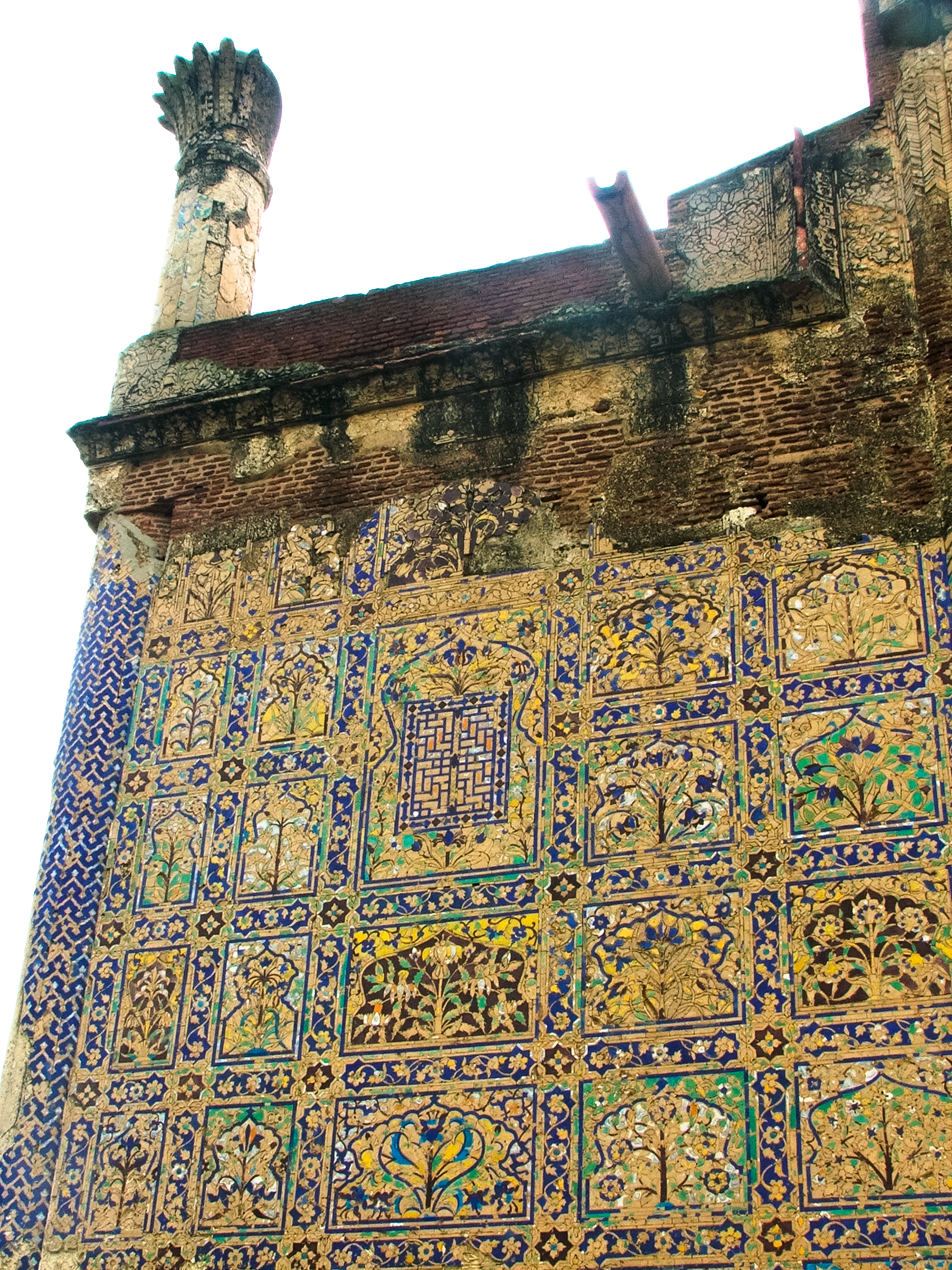
Tile work of Chini Ka Rauza

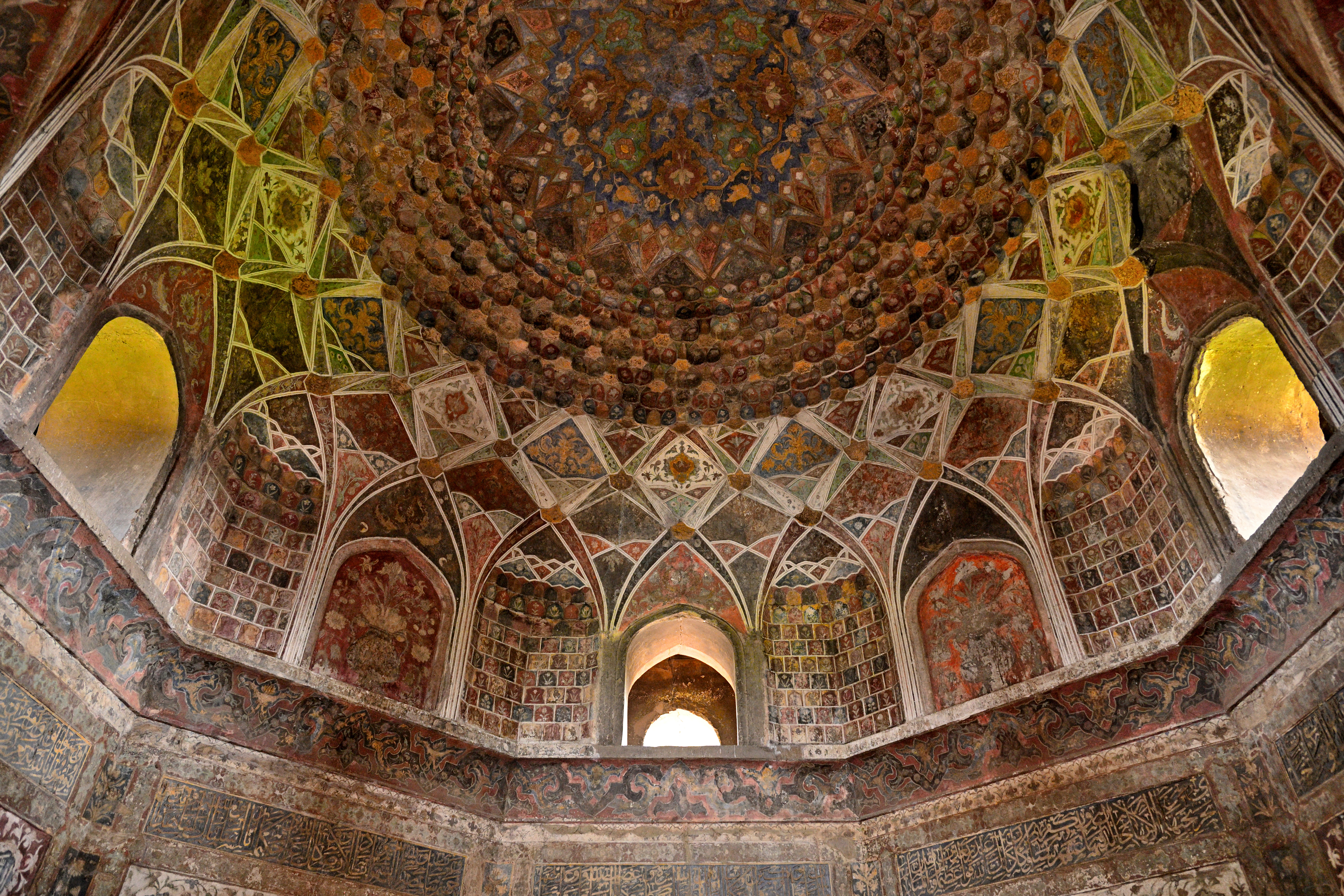
Interior view

== See also ==
- Agra Fort
- Aram Bagh, Agra
