= Amanat Khan Shirazi =

Iranian calligrapher (1570–1645)

- Born: ʿAbd al-Ḥaqq; 1570; Shiraz, Safavid Iran
- Died: 1644 or 1645; Mughal Empire
- Resting place: Sarai Amanat Khan
- Known for: Islamic calligraphy
- Notable work: Taj Mahal inscriptions
- Patrons: Jahangir, Shah Jahan

Amanat Khan Shirazi, also known as ʿAbd al-Ḥaqq Amānat Khān (1570–1644 or 1645), was a calligrapher and scholar who worked in the Mughal court of the emperor Shah Jahan. He is best known for the inscriptions on the Taj Mahal. He also created a rest house, the Sarai Amanat Khan, which is recognised as a national monument in its own right. He made other calligraphic works that have also survived to the present day, including a manuscript of the Quran.

== Biography ==
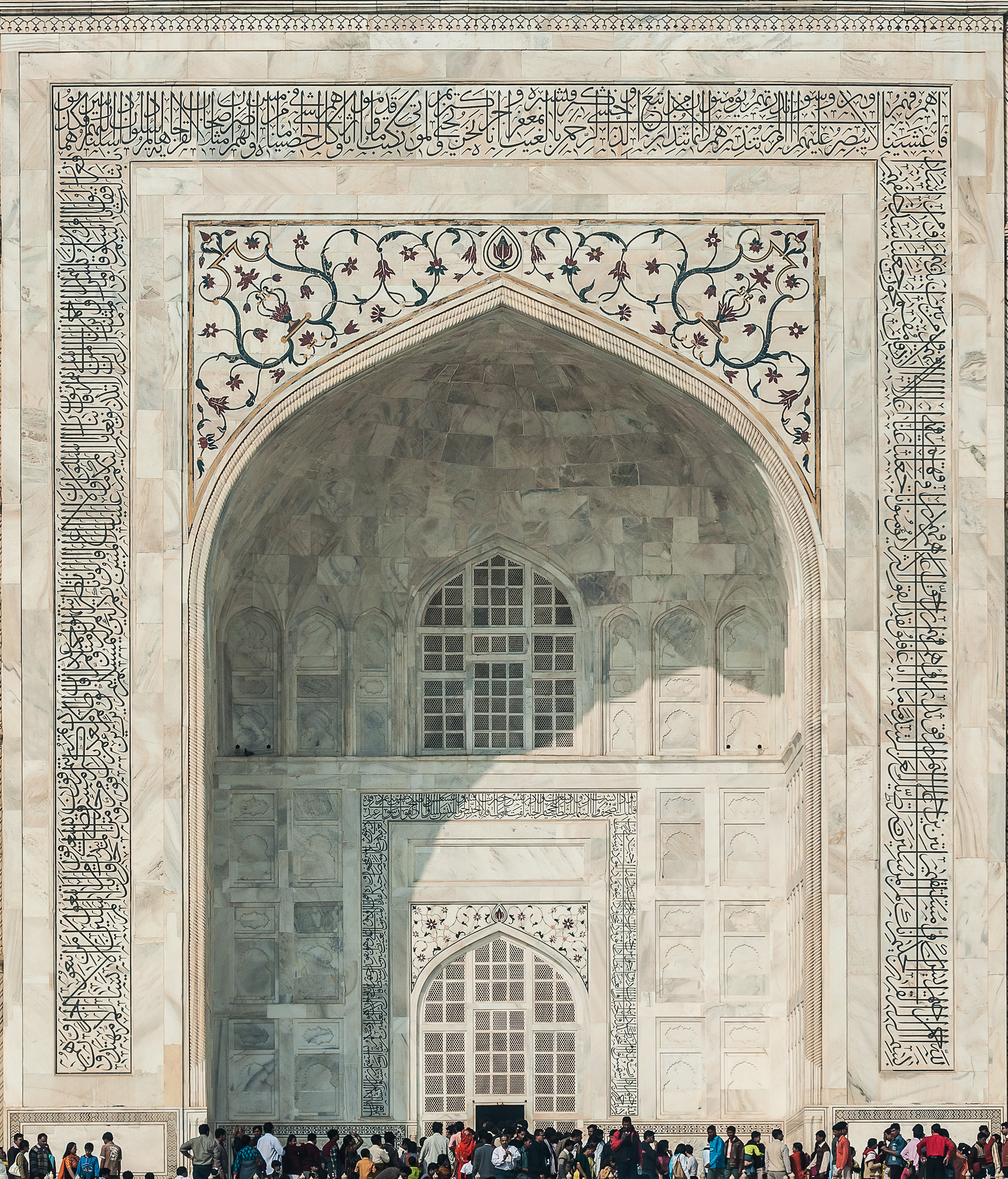
Southern facade of the Taj Mahal showing calligraphy

His name at birth was ʿAbd al-Ḥaqq, alternatively written Abdul Haq. He and his brother Mulla Shukr Allah were born and educated in Shiraz in Safavid Iran. Shiraz was well-known as a centre of learning, and the brothers were known as scholars. Their father Qasim was employed as a scribe by the government and likely taught both sons the art of calligraphy.

They joined the Mughal court in 1608, during the reign of the emperor Jahangir. In 1611 they entered the service of Prince Khurram, the future emperor who in 1617 acquired the title Shah Jahan. At Khurram's urging, Jahangir gave Mulla Shukr Allah the title Afzal Khan ("Distinguished/ learned noble"). In 1632, Shah Jahan awarded ʿAbd al-Ḥaqq the title Amanat Khan ("Trustworthy noble"/ "Lord of trust"). This title came with a generous permanent income and was later accompanied with the military title "Commander of One Thousand". When Shah Jahan became emperor, Amanat Khan worked as a librarian of his personal library and took on some diplomatic duties. His brother had a much more successful career in Shah Jahan's court, becoming Grand Vizier (the senior minister in the government and chief advisor to the emperor).

Amanat Khan died in the 18th year of Shah Jahan's reign (1644 or 1645 CE). His death is recorded in the Padshahnama, the official history of that reign. He was survived by two sons. One of them, ʿAqil Khan, had a long career in the Mughal imperial court.

== Works ==
=== Inscriptions at the tomb of Akbar ===
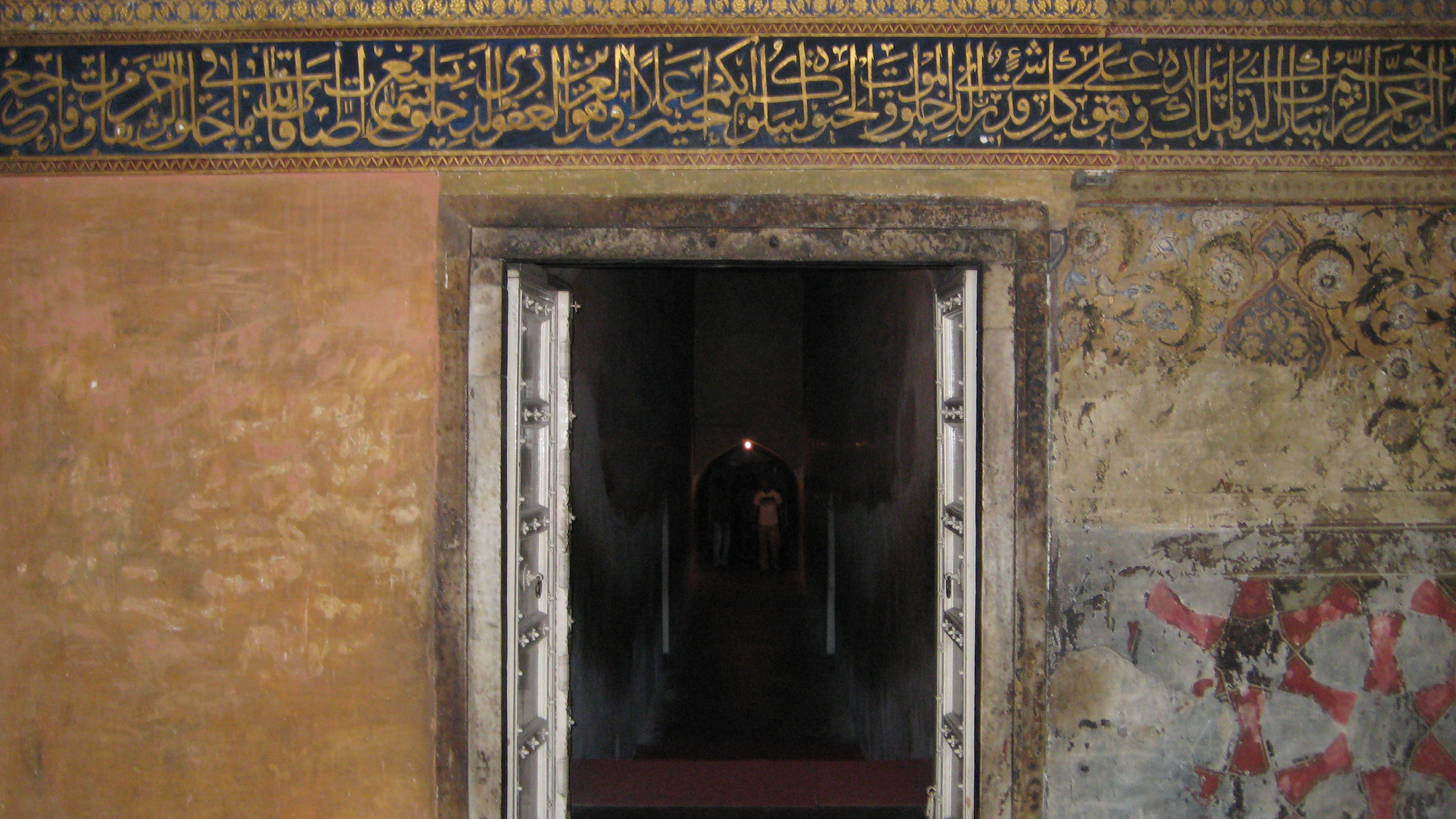
The entrance to the main burial chamber at Akbar's tomb

When the two brothers arrived in Mughal India, the tomb of the third Mughal emperor, Akbar I was under construction in the Sikandra area of Agra. The new emperor Jahangir commissioned ʿAbd-al-Ḥaqq to provide a calligraphed Persian eulogy for the tomb. The inscriptions include ʿAbd-al-Ḥaqq's signature in three places.

=== Taj Mahal inscriptions ===
In 1631, Mumtaz Mahal, Shah Jahan's chief consort and empress, died from complications of childbirth. The emperor was profoundly affected by grief. From the next year onwards, he and his court dedicated themselves to constructing a mausoleum and funerary garden, purchasing a plot of land at Agra. This site, which became known as the Taj Mahal, was conceived as an Earthly counterpart to Mumtaz Mahal's eternal residence in paradise.

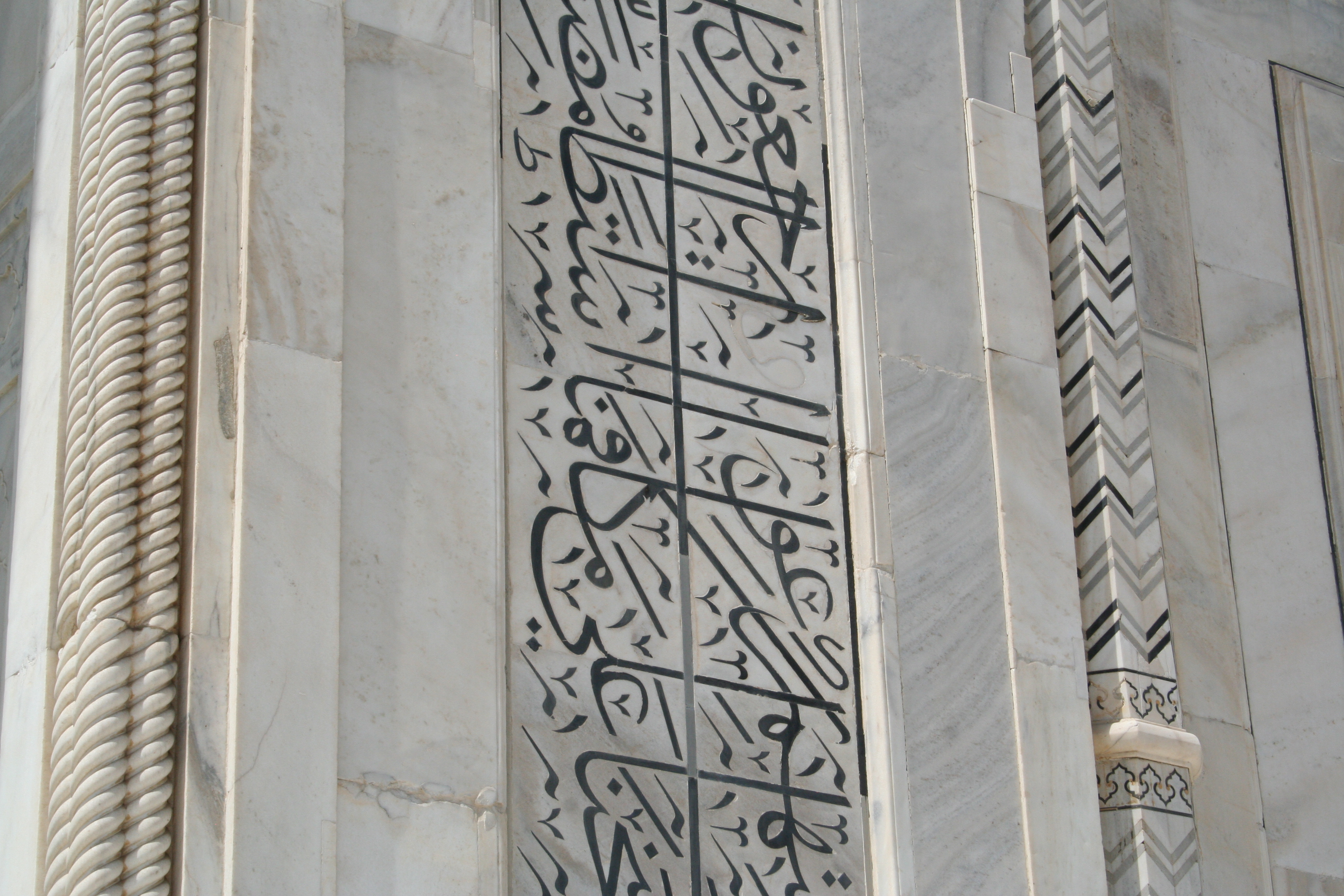
Detail of Taj Mahal calligraphy

Amanat Khan spent six years on the calligraphy, while also continuing his work in the emperor's library. Taj Mahal scholar Ebba Koch has described the calligraphy as "the largest inscriptional programme in the Islamic world." The text of the inscriptions consists almost entirely of twenty-two extracts from the Quran in Arabic, fourteen of which are entire surahs (chapters). These rectangular pieces of calligraphy have a total length of 670 metres (2,200 ft). There are also shorter epigraphs in Persian, including Amanat Khan's signatures. The date of completion of the building is inferred from his inscription "Finished with His help, the Most High", dated 1057 AH (1647 or 1648 CE). Much of the calligraphy is composed of florid thuluth script, made of jasper or black marble, inlaid in white marble panels. Higher panels are written in slightly larger script to reduce the perspective effect when viewed from below. The calligraphy on the marble cenotaphs in the tomb is particularly detailed and delicate.

Guidebooks produced in the 18th and 19th centuries included lists of artisans and calligraphers who supposedly worked on the Taj Mahal, but these are now recognised as fake. The only signatures on the building were Amanat Khan's, reflecting the high status of calligraphy in the Islamic world, and the evidence points to his being in charge of the inscriptions, including choosing the texts. In 1637, Shah Jahan gave Amanat Khan an elephant as a reward for inscriptions inside the dome of the mausoleum.

The Taj Mahal was designated as a UNESCO World Heritage Site in 1983. The register describes it as "the jewel of Islamic art in India and one of the universally admired masterpieces of the world's heritage". The building and its setting, surrounding grounds, and structures are recognised in India as a Monument of National Importance.

=== Shahi Madrassa mosque ===
A mosque built in 1636 in Agra, still standing today, includes Quranic inscriptions created and signed by Amanat Khan. The mosque is quite basic in appearance except for its three intricately decorated mihrabs (niches). Historian of Islamic art Catherine B. Asher has inferred from this that Amanat Khan himself may have organised construction of this mosque.

=== Chini Ka Rauza inscriptions ===
Amanat Khan's brother, Afzal Khan, died in 1639 in Lahore. He and his wife are buried in a monumental mausoleum in Agra that has become known as Chini Ka Rauza ("Tomb of China") because of its covering of glazed tiles. In the central chamber of the tomb there are Quranic inscriptions. Although these are not signed, Catherine B. Asher has written that these inscriptions "were clearly executed by a master artist" and because of the family connection, concludes that this was Amanat Khan.

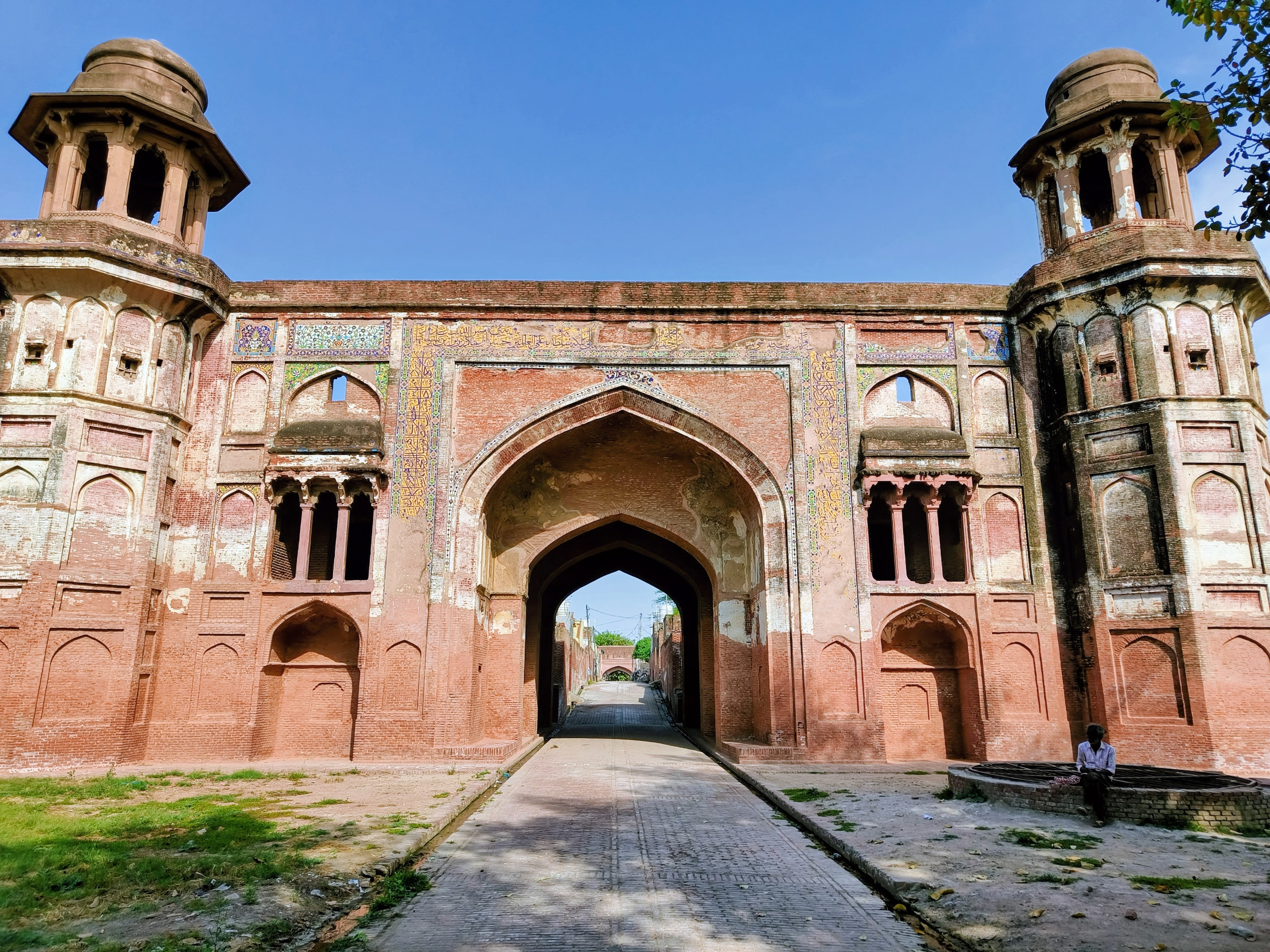
Sarai Amanat Khan, showing calligraphy around the main archway

=== Sarai Amanat Khan ===
Amanat Khan felt that an extravagant tomb was not the ideal memorial for his deeply religious brother, and that a more suitable tribute would be something that provides comfort to people in need. So, using the money he had earned in the Mughal court, he constructed a caravanserai (a rest house for travellers) on the road between Agra and Lahore. The site includes his calligraphed inscriptions in bands on its gates and mosque. It became known as the Sarai Amanat Khan and in 1928 was listed as a Monument of National Importance. The building still exists today, in a dilapidated state, but with some calligraphy still visible.

Amanat Khan spent the later years of his life at the sarai, and is buried in a tomb just outside of it.

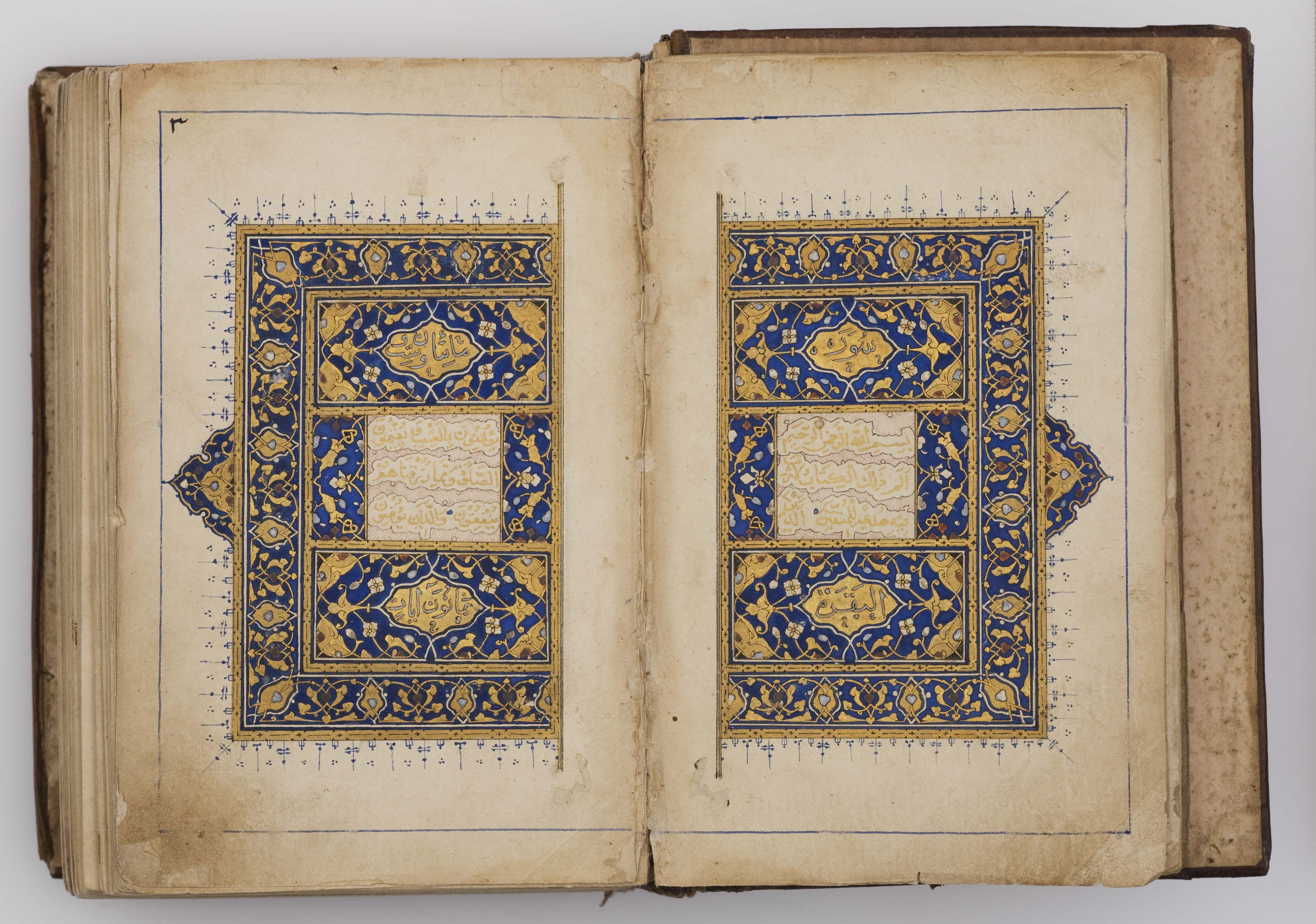
Amanat Khan's Quran

=== Amanat Khan's Quran ===
While living at the sarai, Amanat Khan calligraphed a single-volume manuscript of the Quran in gold, inks, and watercolours. Dated 1050 AH (1640-41 CE), it consists of 512 paper folios with eleven lines of naskh script. It is now in the Khalili Collection of Islamic Art with inventory number QUR 614.
