= Sultan-un-Nissa Begum =

- Timurid Princess
- Born: 25 April 1586; Kashmir, Mughal Empire
- Died: 5 September 1646 (aged 60)
- Burial: Khusro Bagh, Allahabad
- Dynasty: Timurid dynasty
- Father: Jahangir
- Mother: Shah Begum
- Religion: Sunni Islam

Sultan-un-Nissa Nithar Begum (25 April 1586 – 5 September 1646) was a Mughal princess, the eldest child of Mughal Emperor Jahangir from his first wife, Shah Begum.

== Life ==
Sultan-un-Nissa, also known as Nithar Begum, was born on 25 April 1586, in Kashmir during the reign of her grandfather, Akbar, on the intended return journey of the Imperial household towards Fatehpur Sikri. Her father was the eldest surviving son of Akbar, Prince Salim and her mother, Shah Begum, popularly known as Man Bai, was the daughter of Bhagwant Das, the Raja of Amer.

On the occasion of her birth, the Emperor assembled a great feast at the house of the Queen Mother, Mariam Makani where large amount of gifts were exchanged.

Her only full sibling was the ill-fated Khusrau Mirza who was killed on the orders of her younger half-brother, Prince Khurram.

== Death ==
Sultan-un-Nissa died unmarried on 5 September 1646. A tomb was constructed for her in Khusro Bagh in Allahabad, but she was not buried there. She was buried in the mausoleum of her grandfather, Akbar.

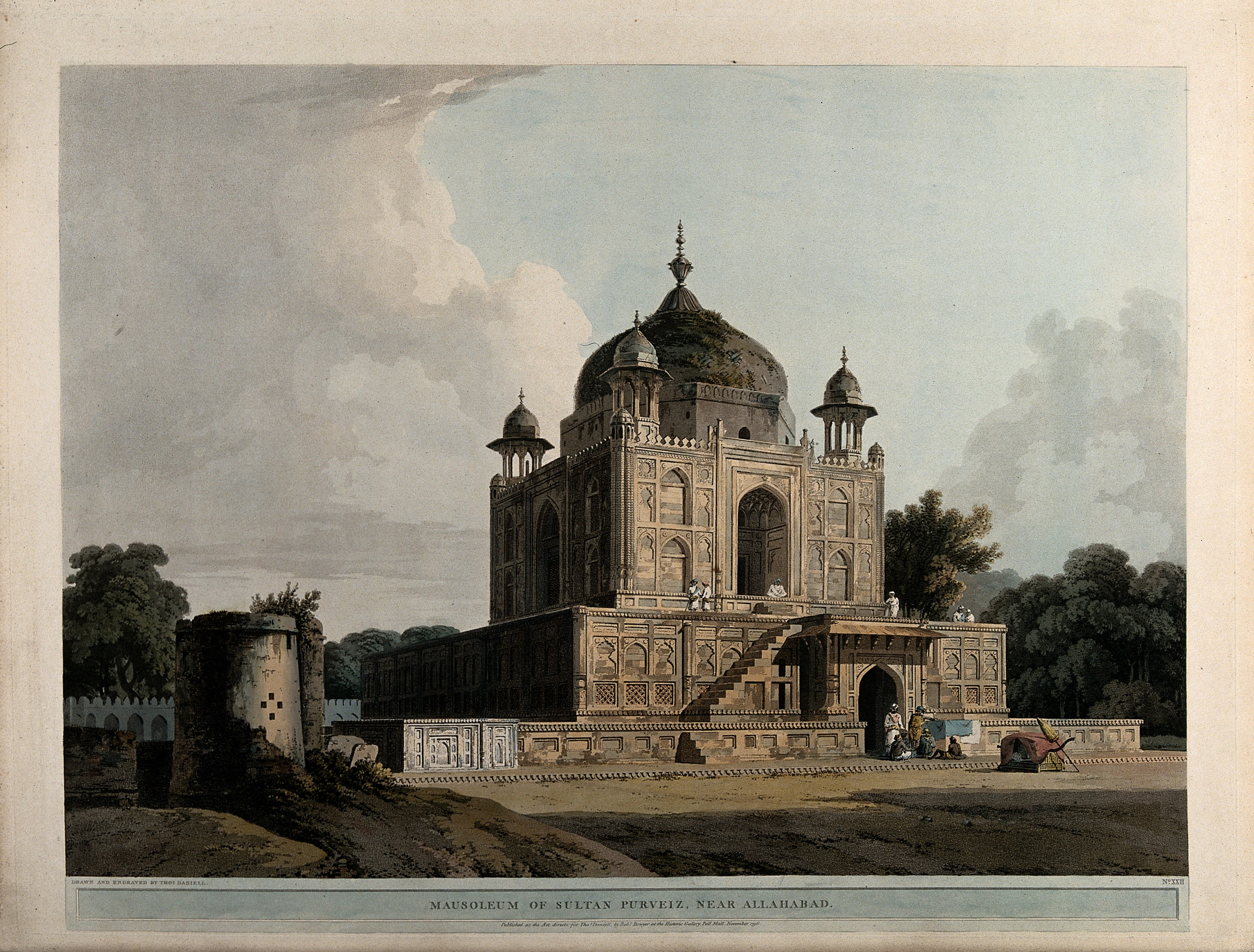
Khusrau Bagh Mausoleum where a tomb was built for Nithar.

== Ancestry ==
Ancestors of Sultan-un-Nissa Begum

8. Nasir-ud-din Muhammad Humayun, Mughal Emperor
4. Jalal-ud-din Muhammad Akbar, Mughal Emperor
9. Hamida Banu Begum
2. Nur-ud-din Muhammad Jahangir, Mughal Emperor
10. Bharmal, Raja of Amber (= 12)
5. Mariam-uz-Zamani
11. Rani Champavati Solanki
1. Sultan-un-Nissa Begum
12. Bharmal, Raja of Amber (= 10)
6. Bhagwant Das, Raja of Amber
13. Phulvati Bai of Mandore
3. Shah Begum
