= Bagh-e-Khusrau =

Garden and burial complex in Prayagraj, India

Coordinates: 25.4423°N 81.8209°E

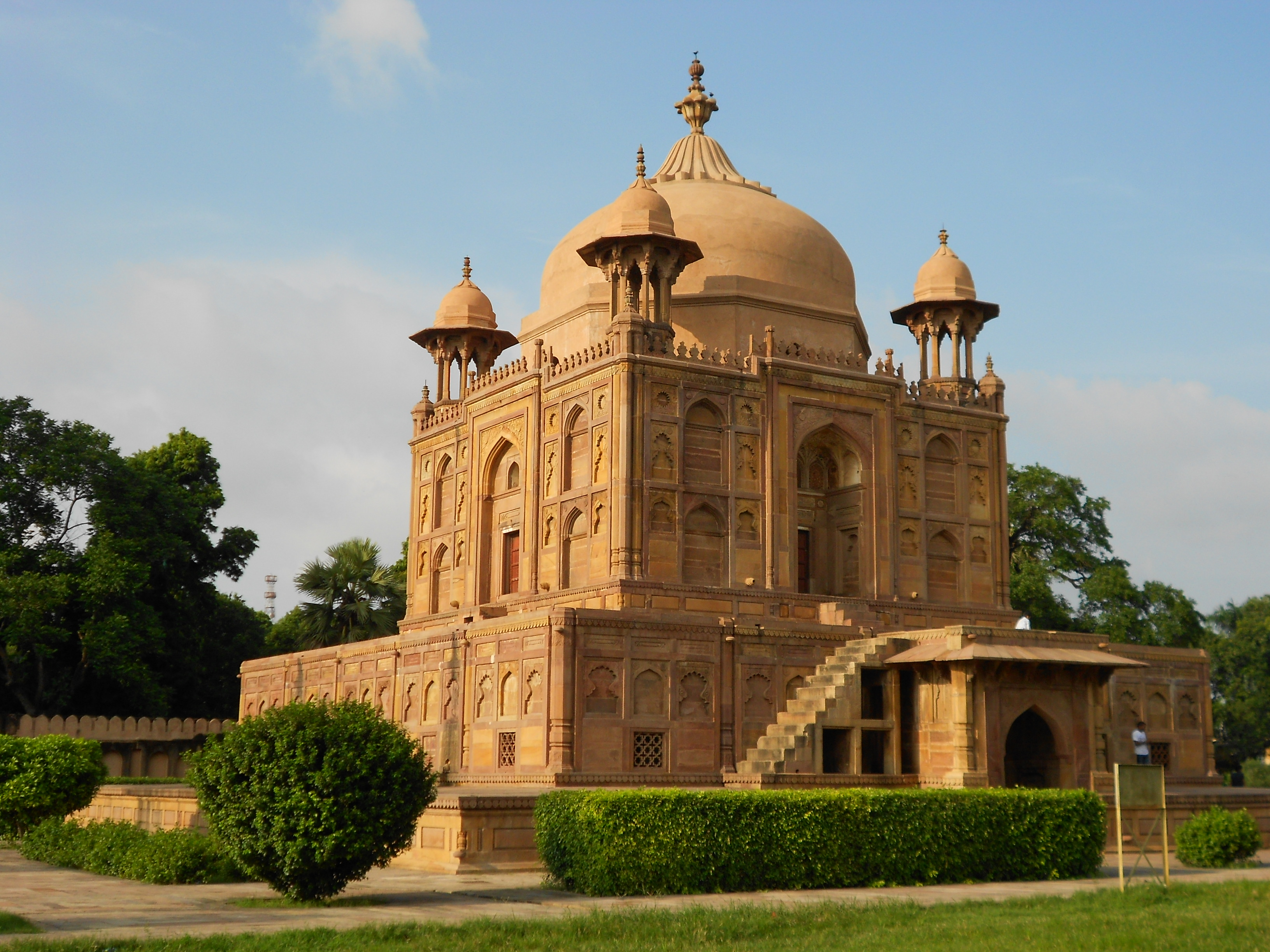
- Tomb of Nithar Begum at Khusro Bagh, Allahabad
- Interactive map of Bagh-e-Khusrau
- Type: Mausoleum complex.
- Location: Allahabad

Bagh-e-Khusrau is a large walled garden and burial complex located in muhalla Khuldabad, close to the Prayagraj Junction railway station, in Allahabad, India. It is roughly 6 km from the Akbari fort at Sangam (built-in r. 1556–1605). It is situated over forty acres and shaped like a quadrangle.

It is listed as an Indian Site of National Importance.

It includes the four tombs:

- Shah Begum (born Manbhawati Bai) (d. 1604), Jahangir's wife, and the daughter of Raja Bhagwant Das and Khusrau Mirza's (d. 1622) mother
- Khusrau Mirza, Jahangir's eldest son and briefly heir apparent to the Mughal throne
- Nithar Begum (born Sultan-un-Nissa) (d. 1646), Khusrau Mirza's sister and Jahangir's daughter
- Bibi Tamolan's tomb

== Architecture ==
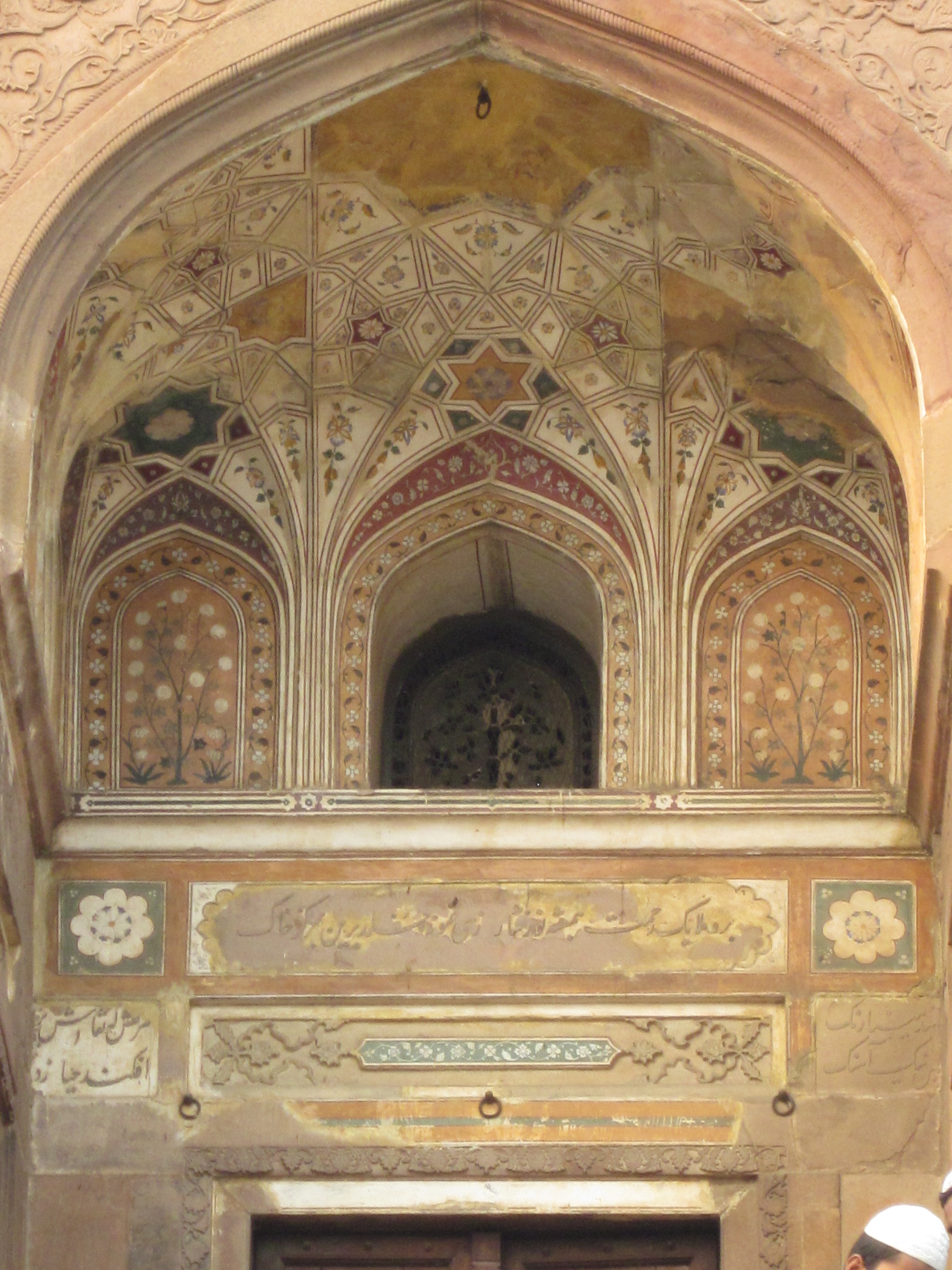
Decorated arch of the Tomb of Nithar

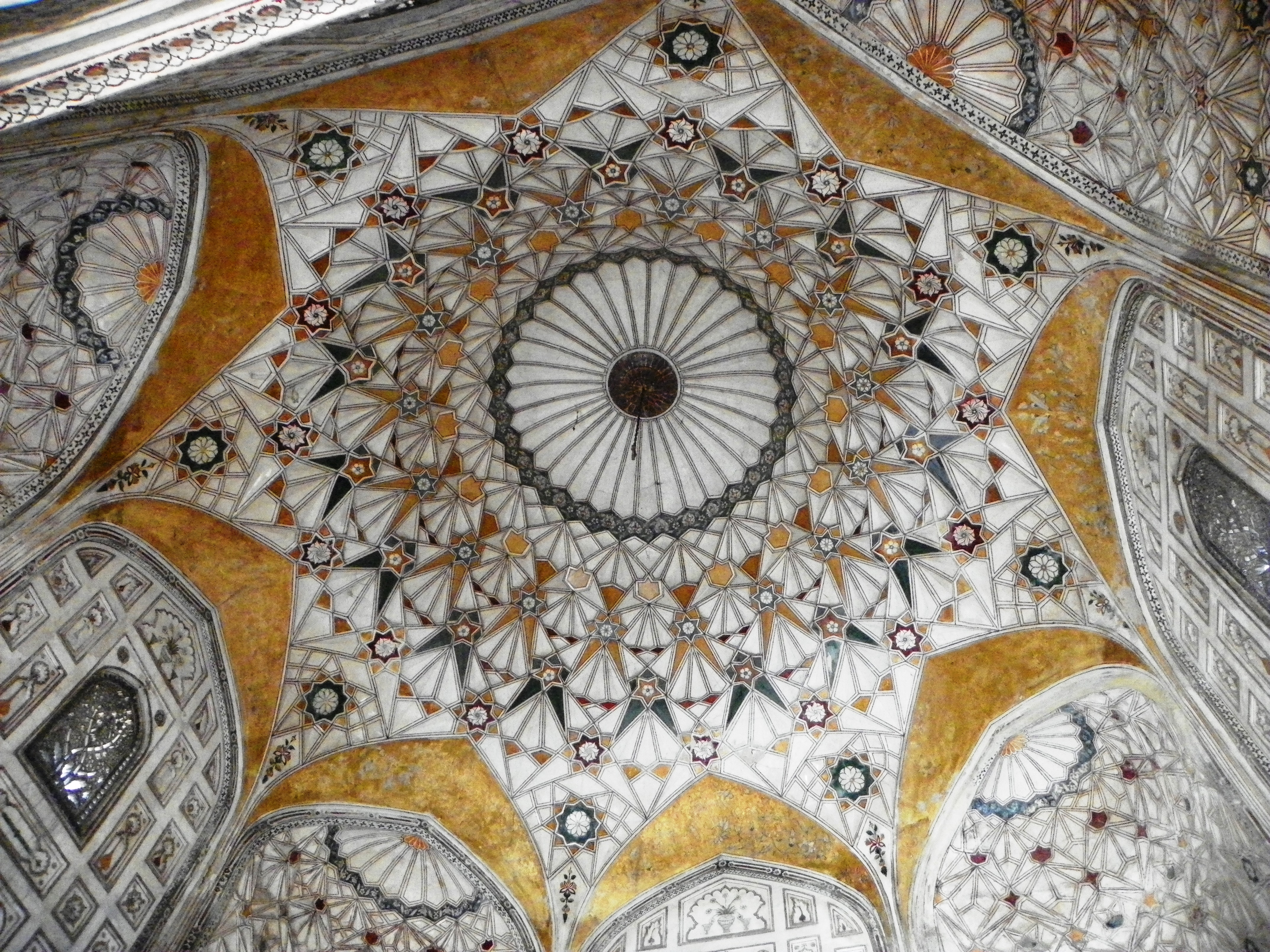
Nithar's tomb interior

The four sandstone mausoleums within this walled garden, present an exquisite example of Mughal architecture. The design of its main entrance, the surrounding gardens, and the three-tier tomb of Shah Begum, who died in 1604, has been attributed to Aqa Reza, Jahangir’s principal court artist. Shah Begum, originally Manbhawati Bai, was the daughter of Raja Bhagwant Das of Amber. Distressed by the discord between her husband Jahangir and son Khusrau, she committed suicide in 1604 by swallowing opium. Her tomb was designed in 1606 by Aqa Reza and is a three-storied terrace plinth without a main mound, inviting comparisons with Fatehpur Sikri by experts. The tomb however has a large chhatri that surmounts the plinth and the arabesque inscriptions that adorn her tomb were carved out by Mir Abdullah Mushkin Qalam, Jahangir's greatest calligrapher.

Next to the Begum's is the tomb of Khusrau's sister, Nithar. Architecturally, this is the most elaborate of the three. It lies on an elevated platform and is adorned with panels depicting the scalloped arch motif. Within the plinth are rooms whose ceilings have been elaborately painted with stars in concentric circles. The central room has on its walls floral decorations depicting Persian cypresses, wine vessels, flowers, and plants.

The tomb of Khusrau is the last of the three tombs at Bagh-e-Khusrau. Khusrau was first imprisoned in the garden after he rebelled against his father, Jahangir, in 1606. Following an attempt to escape, he was blinded by Jahangir's instructions. In 1622 he was killed on the orders of Khusrau's brother and Jahangir's third son Prince Khurram, who later became the Emperor Shah Jahan. The tomb has fretwork windows and the tomb of his mare lies near his own.

Khusrau's tomb was completed in 1622, while that of Nithar Begum's, which lies between Shah Begum's and Khusrau's tombs, was built on her instructions in 1624-25. Nithar's mausoleum is however empty and it does not contain her tomb within it.

During the Revolt of 1857, Bagh-e-Khusrau became the headquarters of the mutinous sepoys under Maulvi Liaquat Ali who took charge as the governor of liberated Allahabad. In Allahabad however, the mutiny was swiftly put down and Bagh-e-Khusrau was retaken by the British in two weeks.

== Gallery ==
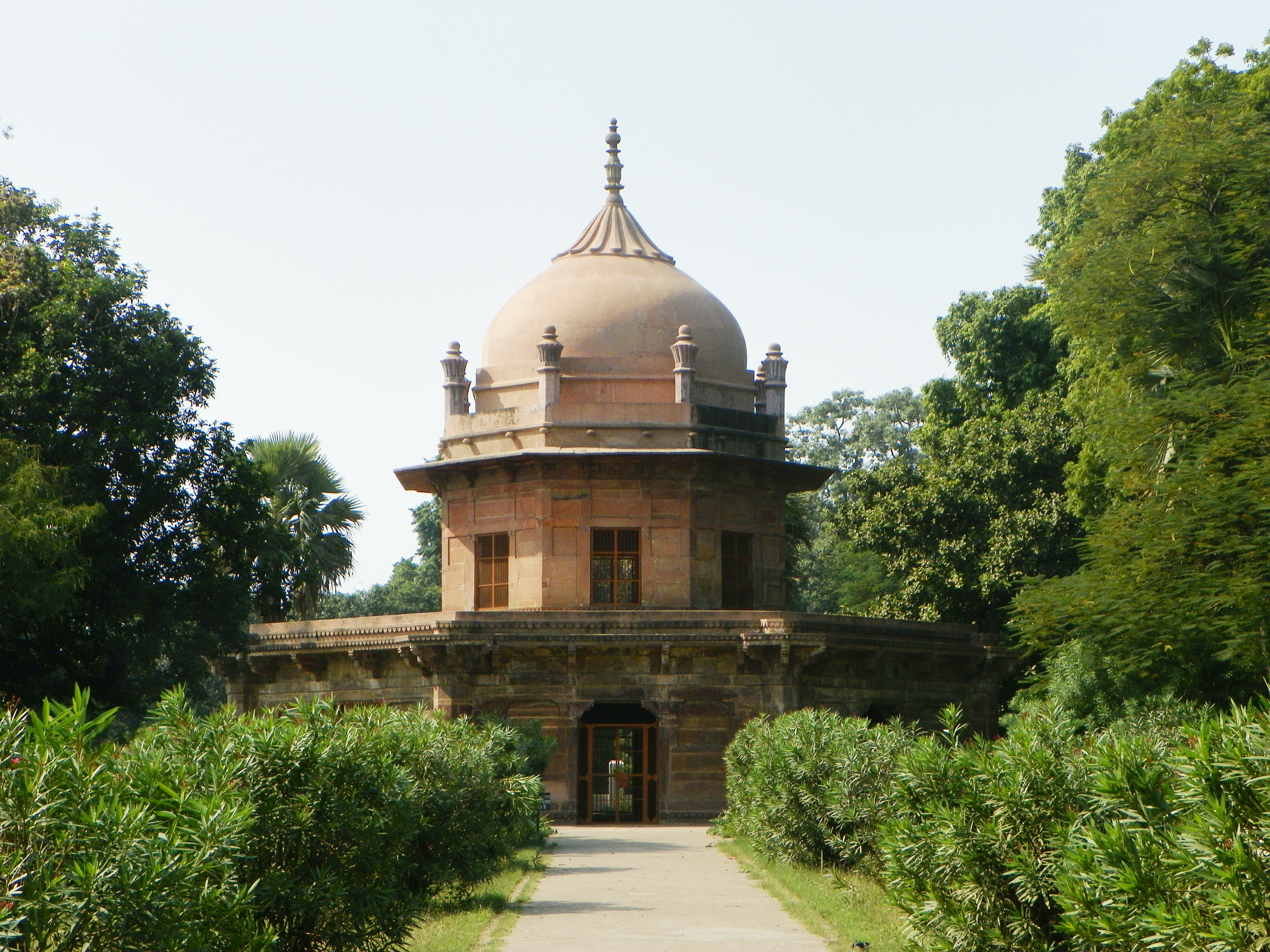
Bibi Tamolan's tomb

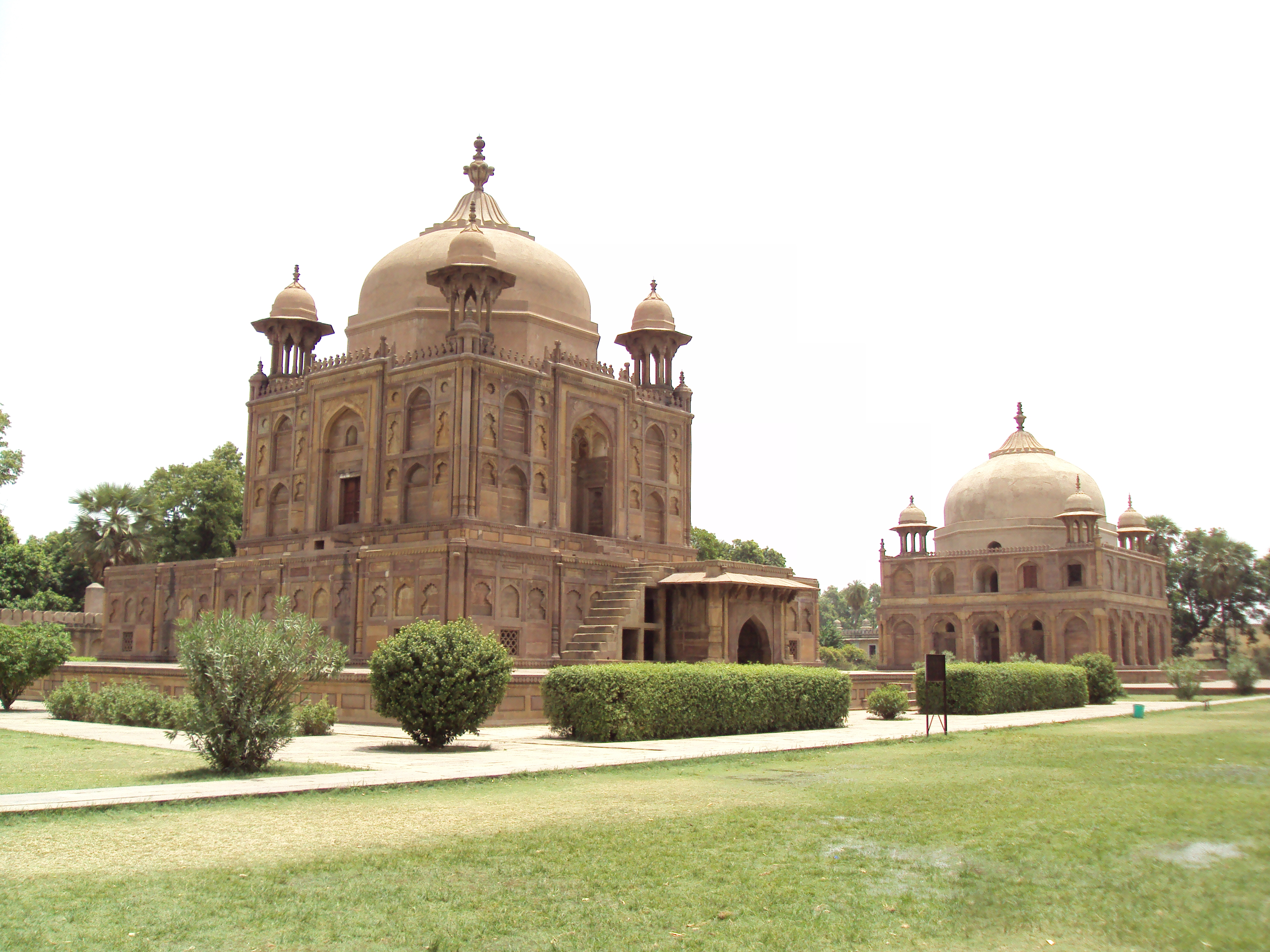
Tomb of Nithar and Khusrau

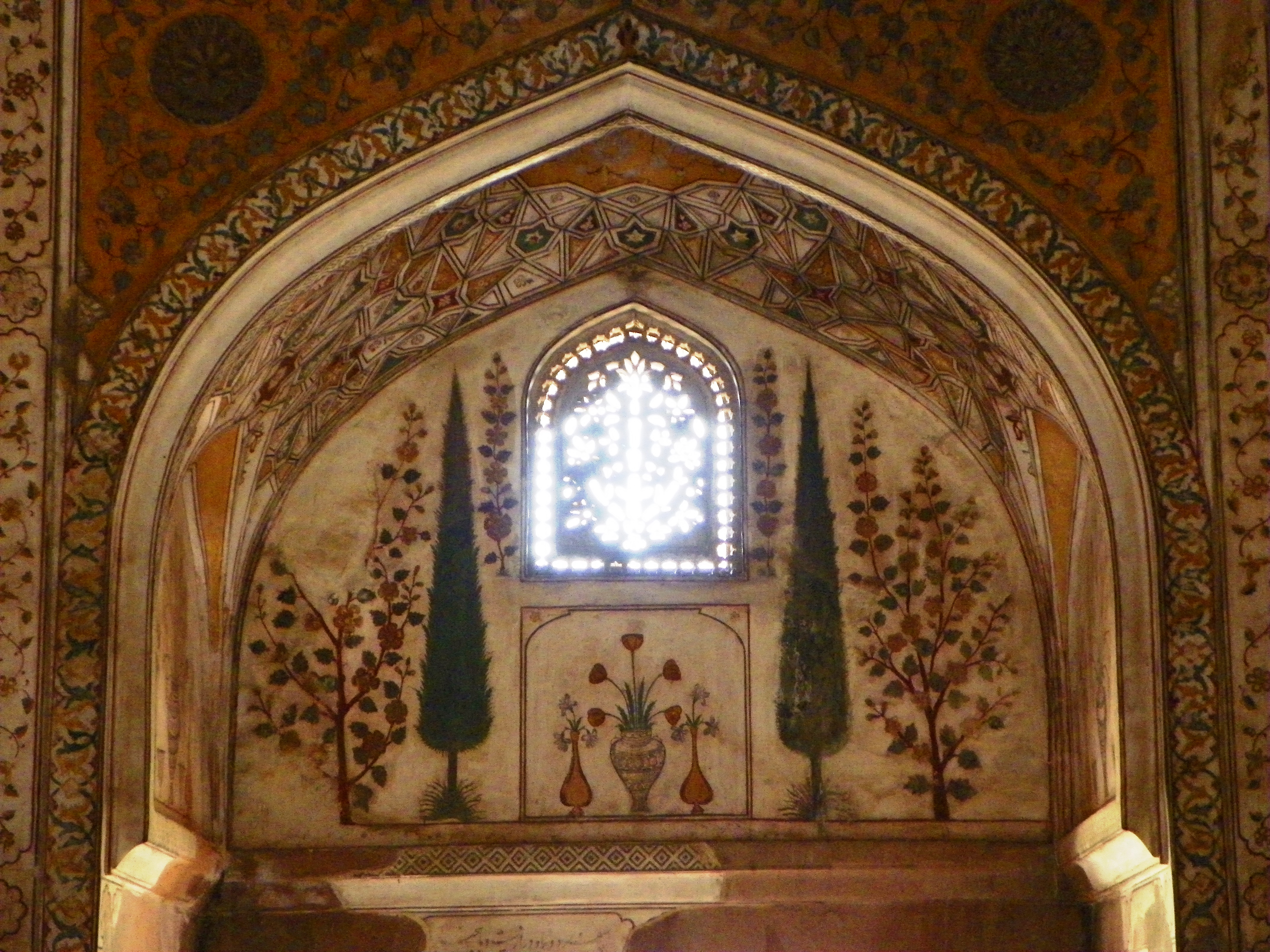
Nithar's tomb interior

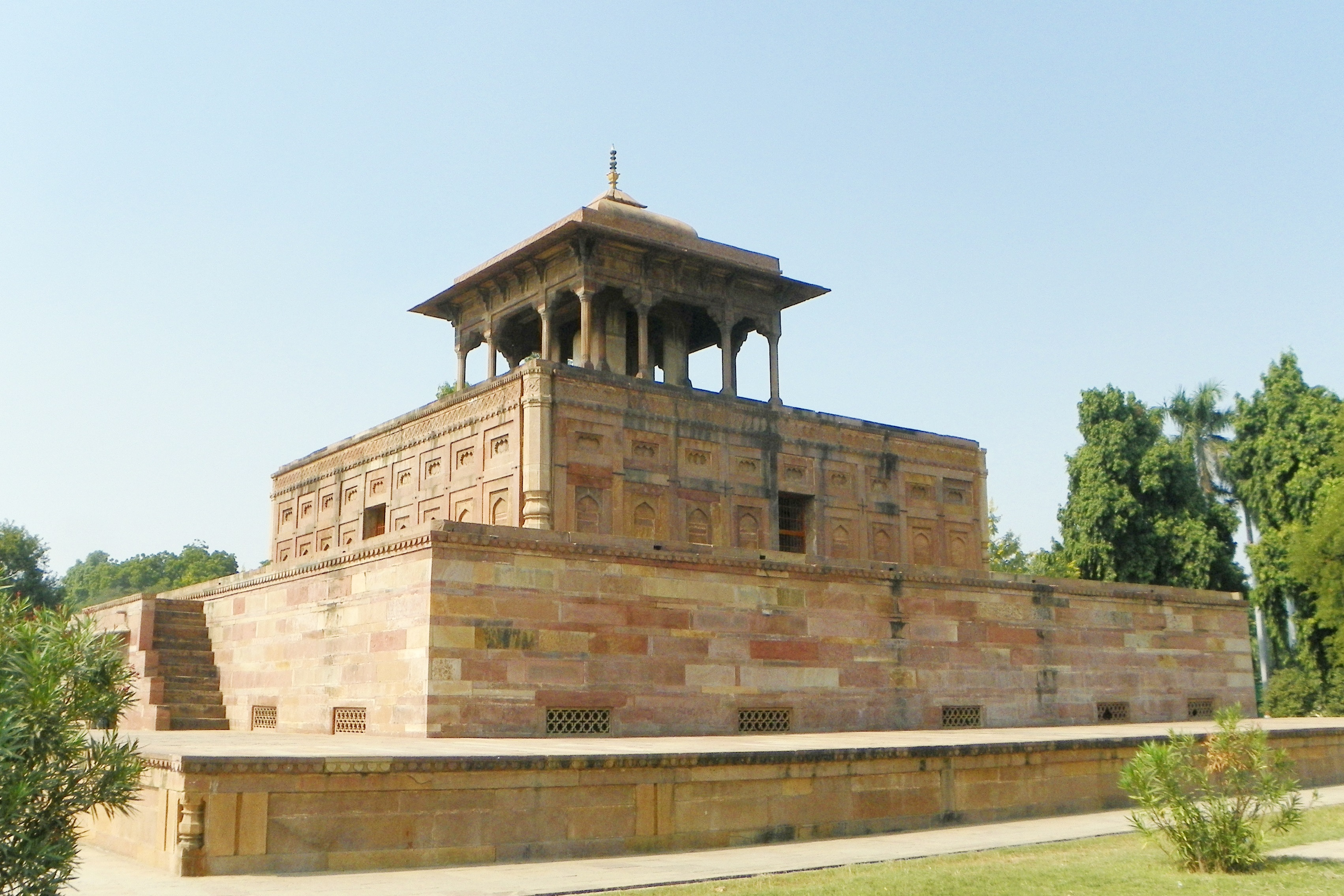
Shah Begum's tomb

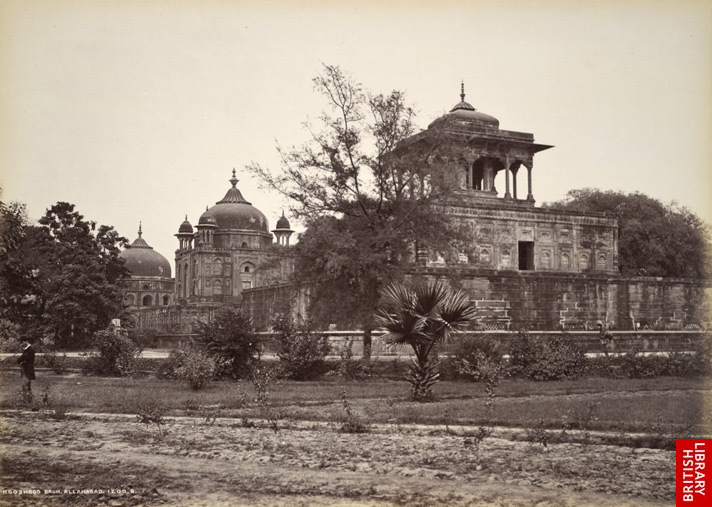
Mausoleums of Sultan Begum, Nithar Begum, and Khusrau; Bagh-e-Khusrau photographed in the 1870s.

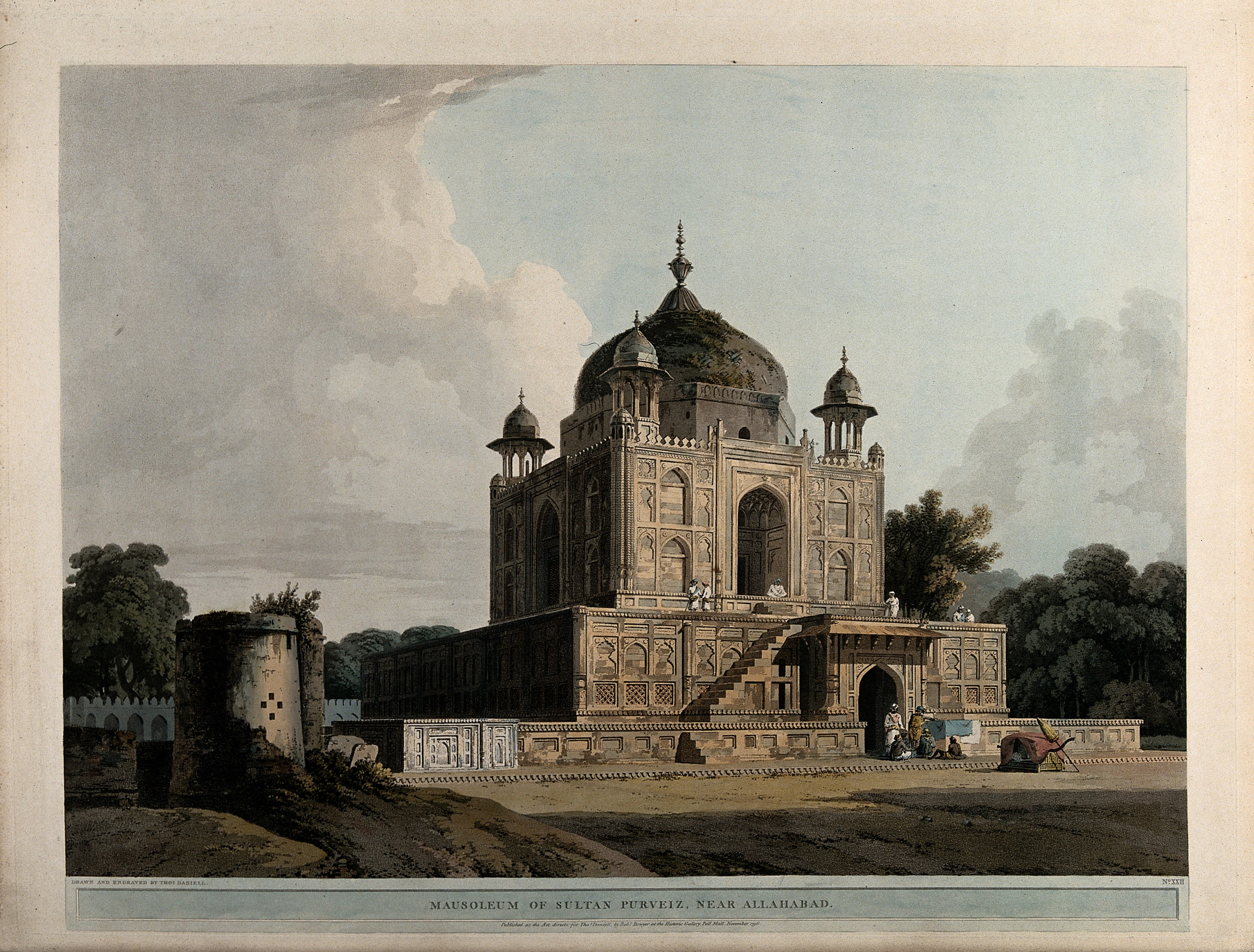
Coloured aquatint by Thomas Daniell, 1796

== See also ==
- Mughal Gardens
- Taj Mahal
- List of tourist attractions in Allahabad
