= Afzal Khan Shirazi =

Mughal grand vizier from 1628 to 1639

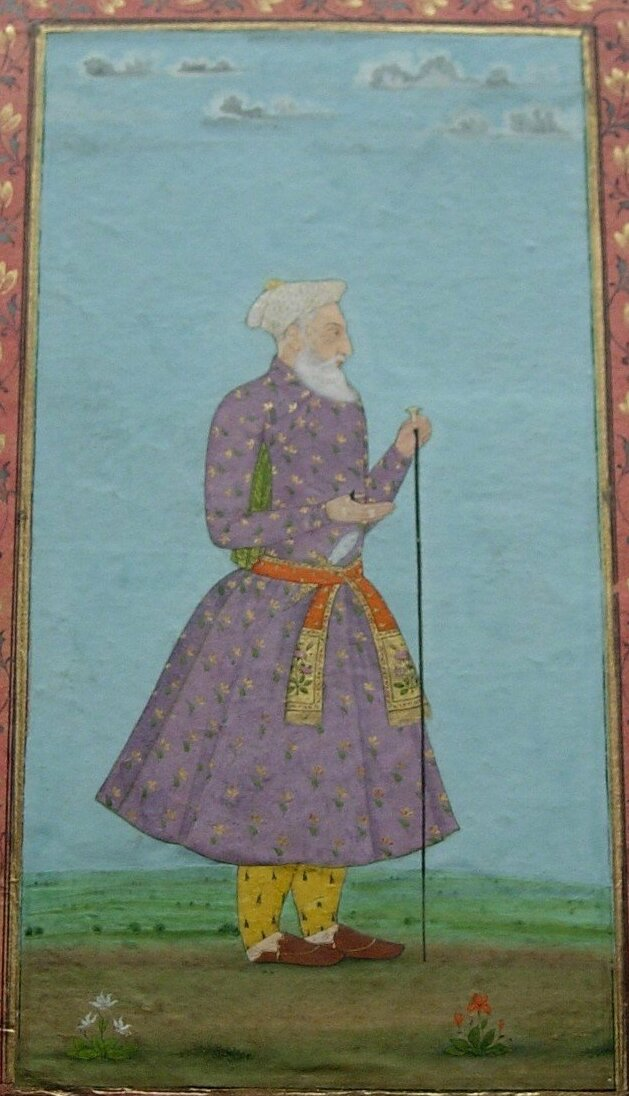
- Portrait of Afzal Khan, Royal Collection.

Grand Vizier
- In office 1628–1639
- Monarch: Shah Jahan
- Preceded by: Azam Khan
- Succeeded by: Islam Khan Mashadi

Personal details
- Born: Mullah Shukrullah Shirazi; 1570 Shiraz, Safavid Iran
- Died: 1639 (aged 68–69) Lahore, Mughal Empire
- Resting place: Chini Ka Rauza, Agra

Mullah Shukrullah Shirazi (1570–1639), known by the royal title Afzal Khan, was a Mughal courtier during the reigns of Jahangir and Shah Jahan. He achieved fame as a scholar and rose to become Grand Vizier of the Mughal Empire, during the period 1628–1639.

== Early life ==
Afzal Khan was born in Shiraz in Safavid Iran where his father was a petty revenue collector in Fars. Two brothers of his father held financial positions in Iran, whilst two others were engaged in trade between Iran and India. Afzal Khan had a brother named Amanat Khan, who would later accompany him to India and become renowned for designing the calligraphic inscriptions on the Taj Mahal. Afzal Khan was educated in the secretarial arts, such as calligraphy, accounts, and prose composition. One of his early teachers was the scholar Taqi al-din Muhammad Shirazi.

== Career ==
=== Safavid administrator ===
Afzal Khan first entered the world of politics in the late 1580s/early 1590s, when he journeyed to Qazvin and began working under the brothers Farhad Khan Qaramanlu and Zulfikar Khan Qaramanlu, members of a prominent Safavid political family. He carried out administrative and diplomatic responsibilities. However, Farhad Khan fell out of favour in the Safavid court and was executed in 1598, as a result of which Afzal Khan withdrew from political life and relocated to Hamadan.

=== Mughal administrator ===
Following a period of study and wandering in Hamadan, Afzal Khan emigrated to India around the year 1608. Upon arriving at the port of Cambay he travelled to Burhanpur, an important Mughal city in the Deccan. Here he entered the service of Mughal noble Abdul Rahim Khan-i-Khanan for three years, becoming one of his favoured companions. Khan-i-Khanan repeatedly recommended Afzal Khan to the Mughal Emperor Jahangir, who eventually granted Afzal Khan a mansab and reassigned him to the position of divan under then-prince Shah Jahan. By 1615, Afzal Khan emerged as one of the chief diplomatic figures in service of the prince. In December 1616, he was additionally made deputy governor of Lahore Subah.

When Shah Jahan rebelled against his father Jahangir, Afzal Khan continued in his employ. However, in mid-1624 he began to work increasingly for the emperor himself, and in 1626 was appointed to the prestigious post of mir-i-saman by Jahangir. Following Jahangir's death in 1627, Afzal Khan supported Shah Jahan in the succession struggle, becoming one of his key allies. After Shah Jahan became emperor, Afzal Khan was elevated to the position of wazir, or prime minister. He was praised for his intellect, administrative abilities and mysticism, and his dedication to "maximising economic productivity and the affluence of the people."

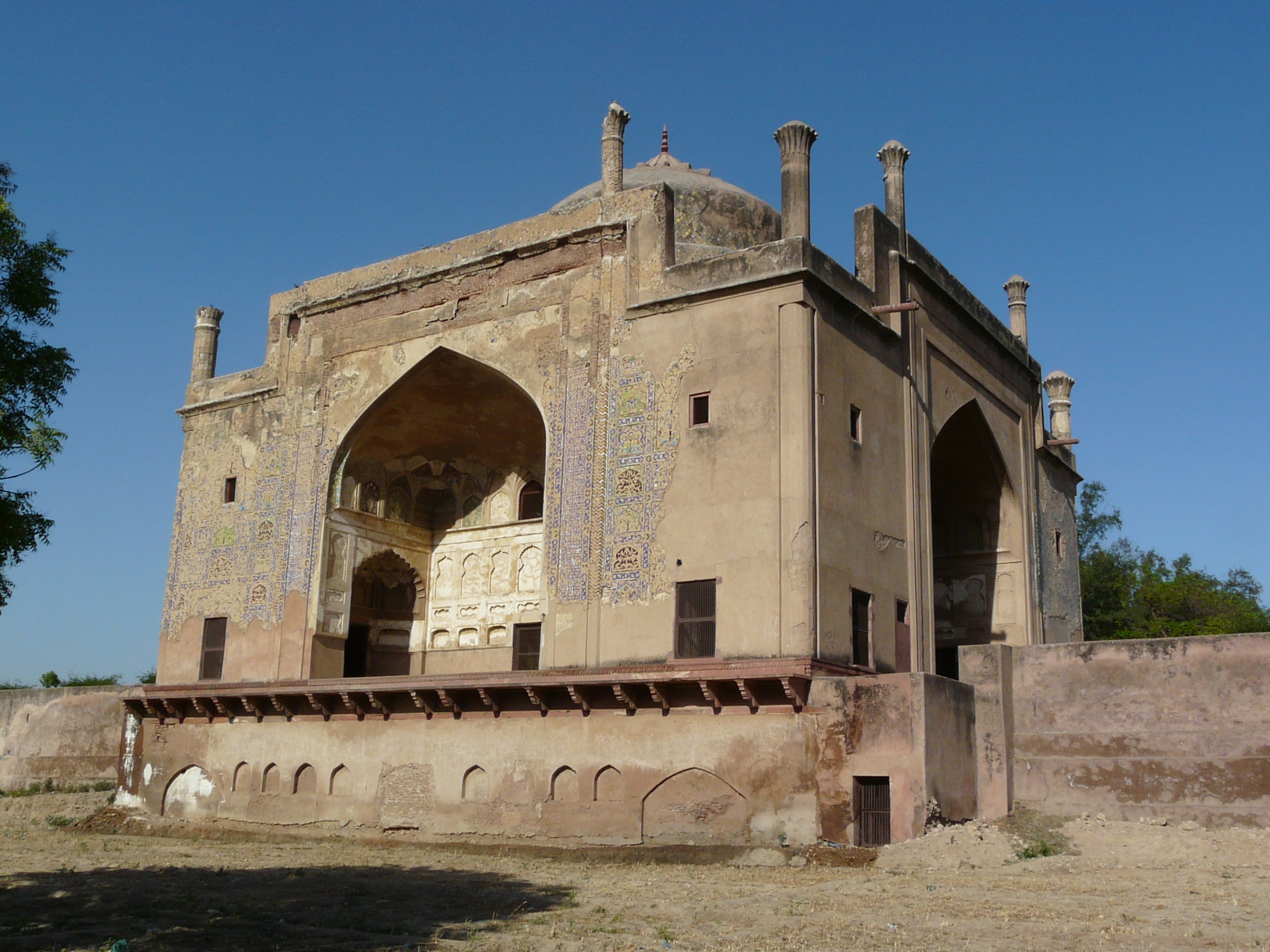
Chini Ka Rauza, Afzal Khan's final resting place

He died at Lahore in 1639. His body was brought to Agra and he was laid to rest in a tomb now known as Chini Ka Rauza.
