= Shah Begum (wife of Jahangir) =

Chief consort of Mughal Emperor Jahangir

- Rajkumari of Kingdom of Amber
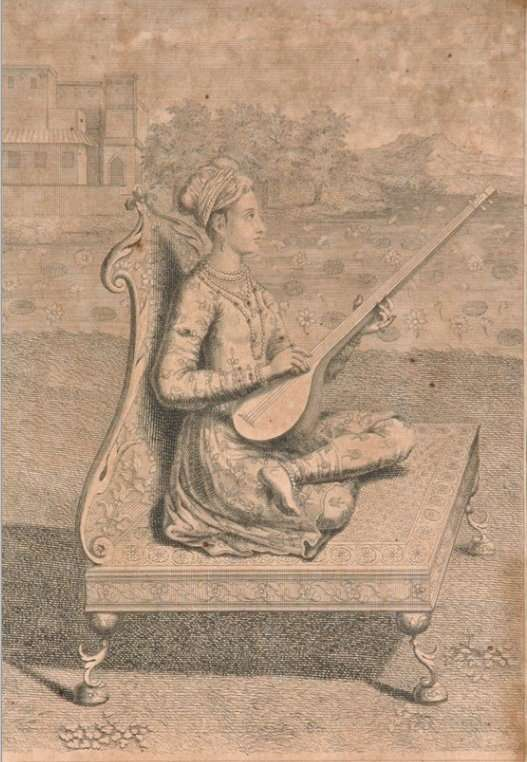
- French Engraving of Shah Begum at Victoria Memorial, Kolkata
- Born: Manbhawati Bai c. 1570; Amber, Amber Kingdom, Mughal Empire (modern-day Rajasthan, India)
- Died: 5 May 1605 (aged 34–35); Allahabad, Awadh Subah, Mughal Empire (modern-day Prayagraj, Uttar Pradesh, India)
- Burial: Khusrau Bagh, Allahabad
- Spouse: Jahangir (m. 1585)
- Issue: Sultan-un-Nissa Begum; Khusrau Mirza
- House: Kacchwaha (by birth); Timurid (by marriage)
- Father: Raja Bhagwant Das
- Religion: Hinduism

Shah Begum (lit. 'royal lady'; c. 1570 – 5 May 1605) was the first wife and chief consort of Prince Salim (later Emperor Jahangir). She was known as Zan-i-Kalan being the first wife of Salim. She was a Hindu princess by birth and committed suicide shortly before the succession of her husband to the royal throne. She was the mother of the eldest daughter and son of Prince Salim, Sultan-un-Nissa Begum and Khusrau Mirza.

== Family ==
Manbhawati Bai, popularly known as Man Bai, was the daughter of Raja Bhagwant Das, the ruler of Amer. She was the sister of Raja Madho Das and the daughter-in-law of Mariam-uz-Zamani.

When she was young, Man Bai was betrothed to her 15-year-old first cousin, Prince Salim. The match was arranged by Salim's mother, Queen Mariam-uz-Zamani, chief consort of Emperor Akbar, and Man Bai's father, Rajah Bhagwan Das Kacchwaha, brother of the Queen. Man Bai was considered a desirable bride, endowed with beauty, grace, and high ideals as well as royal lineage.

The marriage settlement was fixed at twenty million tankas. As the Imperial procession travelled along roads covered with rare and choice cloth, the Emperor scattered gold and jewels over the bridal litter. To honour her household, Akbar and Salim themselves carried the bride's palanquin on their own shoulders for some distance. Mariam Zamani presented the couple with gifts valued at ₹12,000,000.

The couple had two children, Sultan-un-Nissa Begum (25 April 1586 and died on 5 September 1646) and a son, Khusrau Mirza (16 August 1587 – 26 January 1622). On the birth of her son, birth, Man Bai was bestowed the prestigious title of Shah Begum meaning "royal lady".

With her fidelity and sincere devotion to Jahangir, she won a special place in his heart. Jahangir was extremely fond of her and had her designated as his chief consort, and he wrote of his attachment and affection for her in his memoirs.

== Death ==
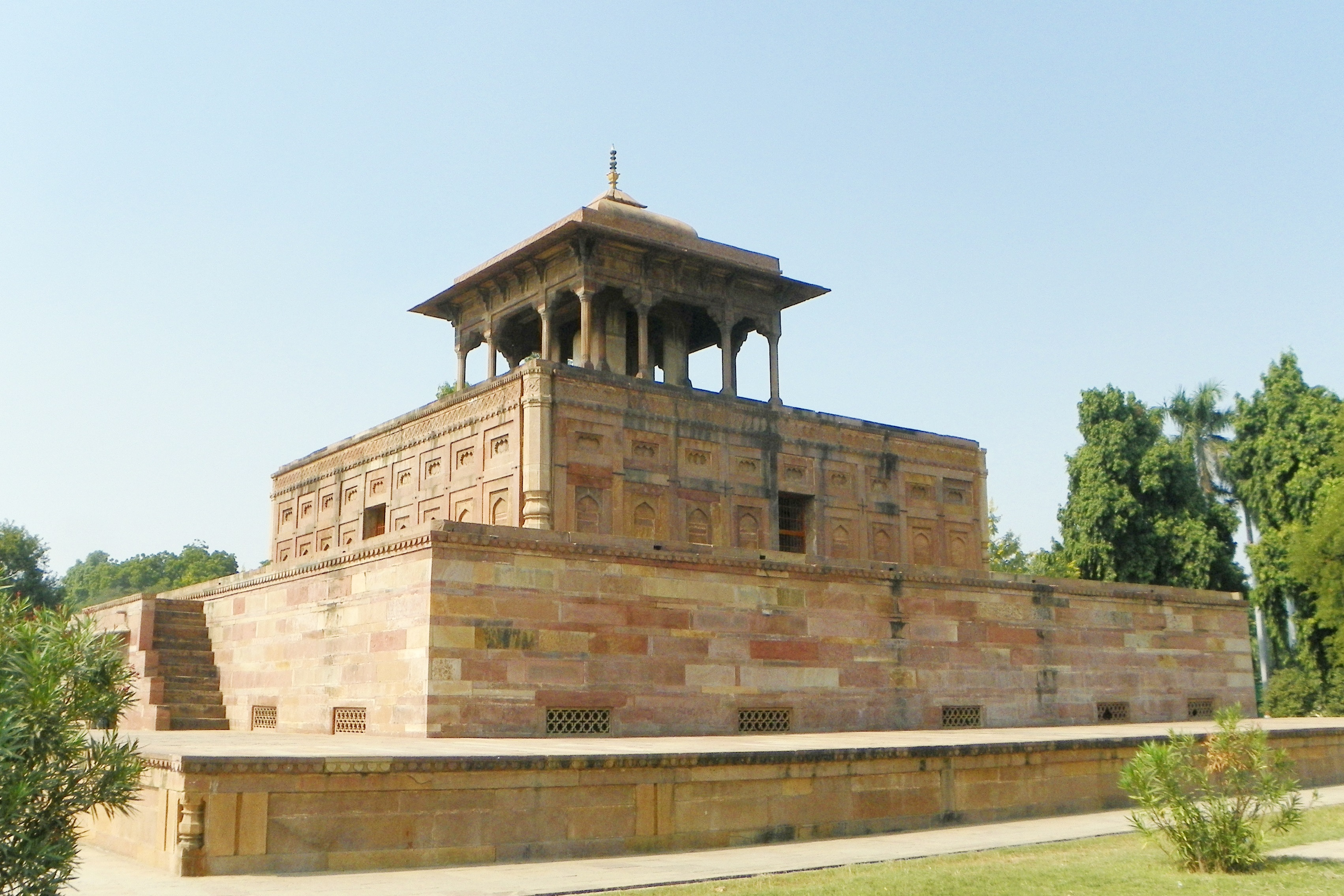
Khusru bagh, Shah Begum tomb, in Prayagraj.

By 1605, Shah Begum's son Khusrau Mirza was in open rebellion against his father, Jahangir's rule, as was her own brother, Madho Singh. Shah Begum, who suffered from periodic bouts of madness, tried to encourage Khusrau's loyalty to his father. In the end, she was unable to cope with the conflict. She took a fatal overdose of opium on 5 May 1605.

Jahangir was devastated by her death. He ordered the construction of her tomb by Aqa Reza, the principal artist at Allahabad court. The tomb, located in Khusrau Bagh, Allahabad, was completed in 1606-07.

== Issue ==
With Jahangir, Shah Begum had at least two children:

- Sultan-un-Nissa (25 April 1586, Mughal Empire – 5 September 1646, Mughal Empire, buried in Tomb of Akbar, Sikandar, Agra)
- Khusrau Mirza (16 August 1587, Lahore, Mughal Empire – 26 January 1622, Deccan, Mughal Empire, buried in Mausoleum of Khusrau Mirza, Khusro Bagh, Allahabad)

== In popular culture ==
- Krutika Desai Khan essayed her role in the Indian television series Noorjahan, on Doordarshan.
- Neetha Shetty portrayed Shah Begum in EPIC channel Siyaasat (based on the Twentieth Wife).
- Heli Daruwala portrayed her role in Colors Channel's Dastaan-E-Mohabbat Salim Anarkali
- Jyotsna Chandola portrayed her role in Jodha Akbar on Zee TV.
- Anushka Luhar portrayed Man Bai in ZEE5's web series Taj: Divided by Blood.

== See also ==
- Kingdom of Amber
- Khusro Bagh

== Bibliography ==
- Prasad, Beni (1930). History of Jahangir. The Indian Press, LTD, Allahabad.
