= Yunus Khan =

Khan of Moghulistan (c. 1416 – 1487)

- Khan of Moghulistan
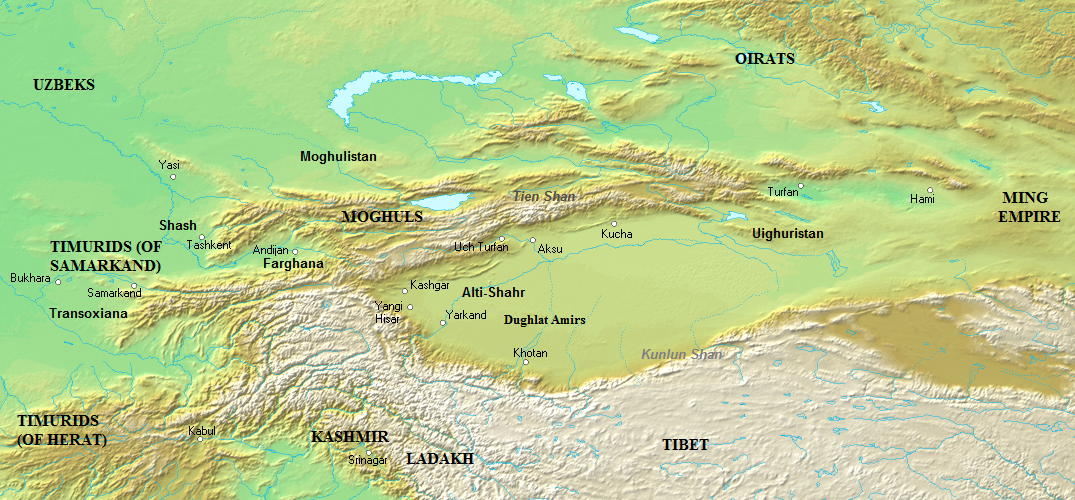
- Central Asia around 1450 A.D.

Mogul Khan of Moghulistan
- Reign: c. 1462 – 1487
- Predecessor: Esen Buqa II (Western Moghulistan); Kebek Sultan (Eastern Moghulistan)
- Successor: Mahmud Khan (Western Moghulistan); Ahmad Alaq (Eastern Moghulistan)
- Born: c. 1416; Moghulistan
- Died: c. 1487 (aged 70–71); Tashkent Moghulistan (now present day Uzbekistan)
- Spouse: Aisan Daulat Begum; Shah Begum
- Issue: Mihr Nigar Khanum; Qutlugh Nigar Khanum; Khub Nigar Khanum; Mahmud Khan; Ahmad Alaq; Sultan Nigar Khanum; Daulat Sultan Khanum
Names
- Yunus Khan bin Uwais Khan
- House: Borjigin Dynasty
- Father: Uwais Khan
- Mother: Daulat Sultan Sakanj
- Religion: Sunni Islam

Yunus Khan (c. 1416 – 1487) (Chagatai and Persian: یونس خان), was Khan of Moghulistan from 1462 until his death in 1487. He is identified by many historians with Ḥājjī `Ali (Chinese: 哈只阿力, Pinyin: Hazhi Ali; Chagatai and Persian: حاجی علی), of the contemporary Chinese records. He was the maternal grandfather of Babur, founder of the Mughal Empire.

Yunus Khan was a direct male-line descendant of Genghis Khan, through his son Chagatai Khan.

== Background and family ==
Yunus Ali was the eldest son of Uwais Khan (or Vais Khan) of Moghulistan. Babur refers to Yunus Khan's mother as a daughter or granddaughter of Shaykh Nuruddin Beg, a Kipchak beg patronised by Timur. Mirza Muhammad Haidar Dughlat, another grandson of Yunus Khan, calls this woman Daulat Sultan Sakanj, and specifically identifies her as Shaykh Nuruddin Beg's daughter. He also names her paternal grandfather as Sar Bugha Kipchak, one of Timur's most prominent generals.

When Vais Khan was killed in 1428 AD, the Moghuls were split as to who should succeed him. Although 12-year-old Yunus Khan was his eldest son, the majority favored Yunus' younger brother, Esen Buqa. As a result, Yunus and his supporters fled to Ulugh Beg, the Timurid ruler of Transoxiana, who however imprisoned the group. Ulugh Beg's father, Shah Rukh, took charge of the young Yunus and treated him well. He sent Yunus to Yazd in Iran to study under Maulana Sharaf ad-Din Ali Yazdi. Yunus Khan spent several years studying under the Maulana in Yazd, in the process becoming one of the most educated Moghuls of his time. After the Maulana died, Yunus wandered around for some time before settling down in the city of Shiraz in Iran.

The following observation was made by a religious dignitary called Mauláná Muhammad Kázi:

I had heard that Yunus Khán was a Moghul, and I concluded that he was a beardless man, with the ways and manners of any other Turk of the desert. But when I saw him, I found he was a person of elegant deportment, with a full beard and a Tájik face, and such refined speech and manner, as is seldom to be found even in a Tájik.

== Early career ==
In 1456, Abu Sa'id, the Timurid ruler of Transoxiana, sent for Yunus Khan. Abu Sa'id had become annoyed with the frequent raids that the Moghuls under Esen Buqa made into his territory and wanted to put an end to the menace. He knew that Esen Buqa had dispossessed Yunus, and that the latter would welcome the chance for a comeback; further, Yunus had both a claim on his brother's throne and kinship ties within the community. Abu Sa'id therefore raised Yunus to Khanship by placing him at the head of an army and sent him to Moghulistan to reduce his brother.

As expected, Yunus Khan's ties of kinship and claim to tribal leadership proved great advantages. He quickly gained the support of several amirs (nobles) and married the daughter one of them, Mir Pir Haji Kunji. Her name was Aisan Daulat Begum, and she is believed to have been his first wife, although Yunus was already about 40 years old by this time. She would bear Yunus three daughters:

1. Mihr Nigar Khanim (b. 1457), wife of Sultan Ahmed Mirza, eldest son of Yunus Khan's mentor Abu Sa'id.
2. Qutlugh Nigar Khanum (b. 1459), wife of Umar Shaikh Mirza II, fourth son of Abu Sa'id and younger brother of Sultan Ahmed. Their only son, Babur, would become the founder of the Mughal Empire.

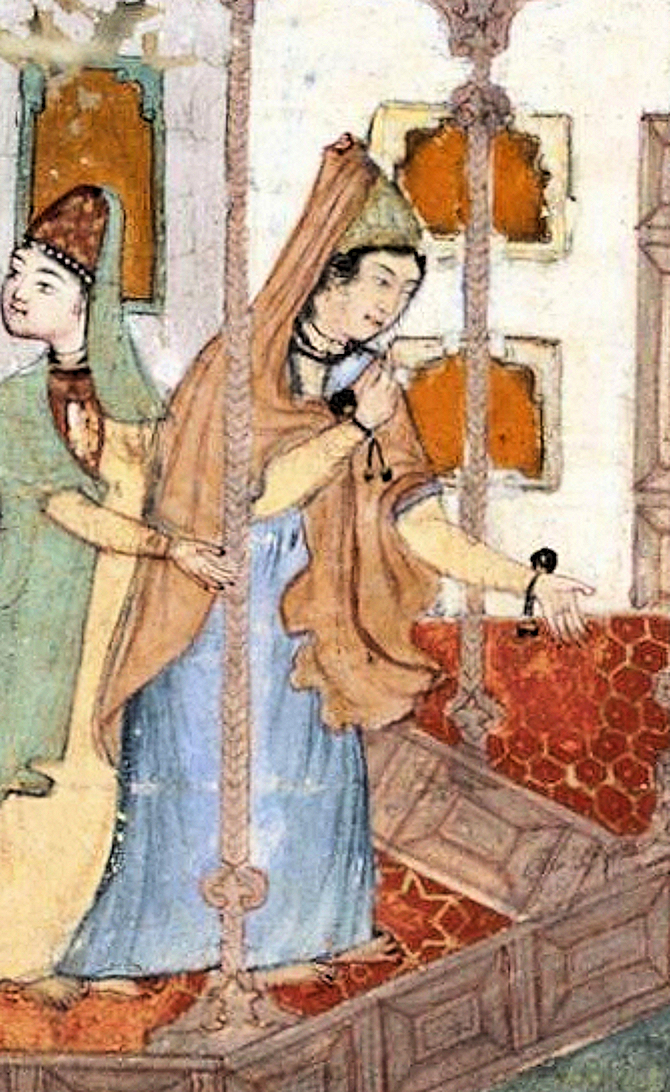
Khub Nigar Khanim (b. 1463), daughter of Yunus Khan, and wife of Muhammad Husain Mirza Dughlat

1. Khub Nigar Khanim (b. 1463). After her father died, her half-brother (see below) gave her in marriage to Muhammad Husain Mirza Dughlat. She became the mother of Mirza Muhammad Haidar Dughlat, famous historian and future ruler of Kashmir.

Despite his success in making allies, Yunus did not succeed in his project of displacing Esen Buqa, perhaps because he had no experience of war. When Yunus moved to take the town of Kashgar, he was faced by the joined armies of Amir Sayyid Ali of Kashgar and Esen Buqa, and in the ensuing battle, he was defeated. Soon afterwards, he retreated from Moghulistan and returned to the court of Abu Sa'id, who gave him territory around Lake Issyk-Kul as a fiefdom (in appanage). After a while, Yunus Khan again entered Moghulistan and again gained the support of the amirs, but was again unable to make any substantial gains in the country against Esen Buqa.

In 1457, dughlat Amir Sayyid Ali of Kashgar (Esen Buqa's ally the previous year) died and his son Saniz Mirza sought Yunus Khan's assistance to gain power in Kashgar. Yunus Khan came into Kashgar after receiving this invitation. Shortly afterwards, he sent one of the most respectable Sayyids of Kashgar, Amir Zia-ud-Din, to Badakhshan to meet Shah Sultan Muhammad Badakhshi and seek one of his six daughters in marriage. Shah Sultan Muhammad Badakhshi (also known as "Prince Lali") was believed to be a direct descendant of Iskandar Zulkarnain (Alexander the Great), son of Filikus Rumi (Philip II of Macedon), who according to (dubious) legend left one of his sons in the isolated mountain country out of reach of rivals in hope that his progeny would continue his dynasty in the East. Prince Lali agreed to give a daughter to Yunus Khan in marriage. He entrusted his fourth daughter, Shah Begum, to Sayyid Zia-ud-Din, who brought her back with him to Kashgar and delivered her over to Yunus Khan, and the wedding was celebrated with due ceremony. Note that Yunus Khan entered into his second marriage just around one year after his first marriage, and he was already around 40 years old by this time. This would indicate that because of his poverty and lack of prospects, he had been unable to secure wives of respectable rank until this time. His consciousness of his high birth would have prevented him from accepting wives of inferior birth, but his recent rise had removed all obstacles and provided him with two suitable wives. He was soon blessed with progeny by both wives and became the father of a numerous family. Yunus Khan begat two sons and two daughters by Shah Begum:

1. Sultan Mahmud Khan, eldest child by Shah Begum, born in 1462.
2. Sultan Ahmad Khan, second son, known later as Alacha (Slayer) Khan for his brutal attempts to usurp absolute power in the steppe by slaughtering the Kalmaks.
3. Sultan Nigar Khanim, wife of Sultan Mahmud Mirza, third son of Yunus Khan's mentor Abu Sa'id
4. Daulat Sultan Khanim, daughter

== Khanship ==
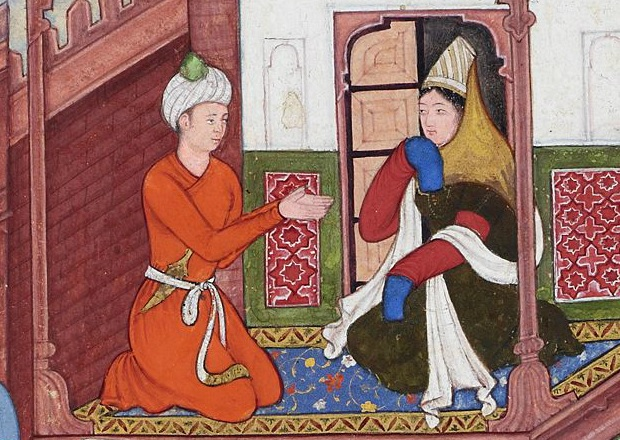
Aisan Daulat Begum, wife of Yunus Khan, giving advice to her grandson Babur

In 1462, Yunus's brother Esen Buqa died. The Moghuls were divided over whether to support his son, Dost Muhammad, or his elder brother, namely Yunus himself, as his successor. The dughlat amir of Kashgar, Muhammad Haidar Mirza, supported Dost Muhammad, but his brother Saniz Mirza, the amir of Yarkand (who, it will be recollected, had taken Yunus Khan's help and invited him into Kashgar in 1457) supported Yunus Khan, and expelled Dost Mohammad from Kashgar. Dost Mohammad however consolidated his hold on all settled lands in Eastern Moghulistan, known at the time as Uyghurstan. He became the ruler of that region and took up residence in the town of Aksu, thus abandoning the nomadic style of life. Saniz Mirza died after only a few years, in 1464, and Dost Muhammad plundered Kashgar to avenge his previous expulsion. Shortly aftwewards however, in 1468 or 1469, Dost Muhammad died and Yunus Khan found it possible to seize Aksu. Dost Muhammad's son, Kebek Sultan, who was only a child, was whisked away by his supporters to Turpan (Uyghurstan), where he ruled nominally for a few years before being killed by the same supporters.

Ruling from Aksu as Khan, Yunus Khan maintained good relations with the Timurids and with Janybek Khan and Karai Khan, the founders of the Kazakh Horde (in 1465-1466). As a consequence of his alliance with the Kazakhs, he made an enemy out of the rival Uzbeks. In 1468, the Uzbeks under Shaikh Haidar came into conflict with the Moghuls; they were defeated and Shaikh Haidar was killed, breaking Uzbek power until the rise of Muhammad Shaibani by the end of the century.

Yunus' dealings with the Timurids were far more complex. The Timurid ruler Abu Sa'id had been Yunus Khan's great mentor in life, who had called him from obscurity and exile in Iran and bestowed lands and an army upon him. After Abu Sa'id Mirza was killed by the White Sheep Turkmen in 1468, his realm was split between his sons. The eldest son, Sultan Ahmad Mirza, ruled over Samarkand & Bukhara, the third son, Sultan Mahmud Mirza took Balkh and Badakhshan, and the fourth son, Umar Shaikh Mirza II, became the ruler of Ferghana. All three of these princes were to eventually marry three daughters of Yunus Khan, but his relationship with them began on a discordant note.

By the time Abu Sa'id Mirza was killed in 1468, Yunus Khan had been overlord of the Mughals for about six years. During this time, his support among his principal amirs (noblemen) had eroded. The amirs were apparently upset over Yunus Khan's desire to reside in towns and abandon the traditional nomadic way of life. Since Yunus Khan had spent much of his early life in the towns of Yazd and Shiraz as a student, he had developed a taste for settled life in towns and a certain discomfort with the nomadic lifestyle of his community, the Mughals. This was a major issue in that milieu, and the amirs invited Sultan Ahmad's governor of Tashkent, Shaikh Jamal Khan, to displace Yunus Khan and usurp power. This duly happened; the Moghuls submitted to Shaikh Jamal Khan, who took over power and also imprisoned Yunus Khan for a year. However, the amirs soon had cause to regret the choice they had made, for Shaikh Jamal Khan was not a wise and moderate man; he was given to over-reach and excess. He demonstrated these qualities strikingly when he gave Yunus Khan's first wife, Isan Daulat Begum, maternal grandmother of Babur, as a present (or booty of war) to his officer Khoja Kalan. When Khoja Kalan entered Isan Daulat Begum's apartments to claim her for himself, he was trapped inside and killed there by female attendants of Isan Daulat Begum, and thus the lady managed to preserve her honour. Khoja Kalan lost his life, and Shaikh Jamal Khan who lost his honour in the eyes of the amirs for having been so cavalier and insensitive in handing over a married woman to someone as booty of war. Some time after this event, Shaikh Jamal himself was killed by Moghul amirs and Yunus Khan was restored, after promising not to live in towns but follow the nomadic way of life. This happened in 1472. Shortly afterwards, after learning that Kebek Sultan (the young son of Dost Mohammad) had been killed by his followers, Yunus Khan to take control of Eastern Moghulistan (Uyghurstan). This happened in the same year, 1472.

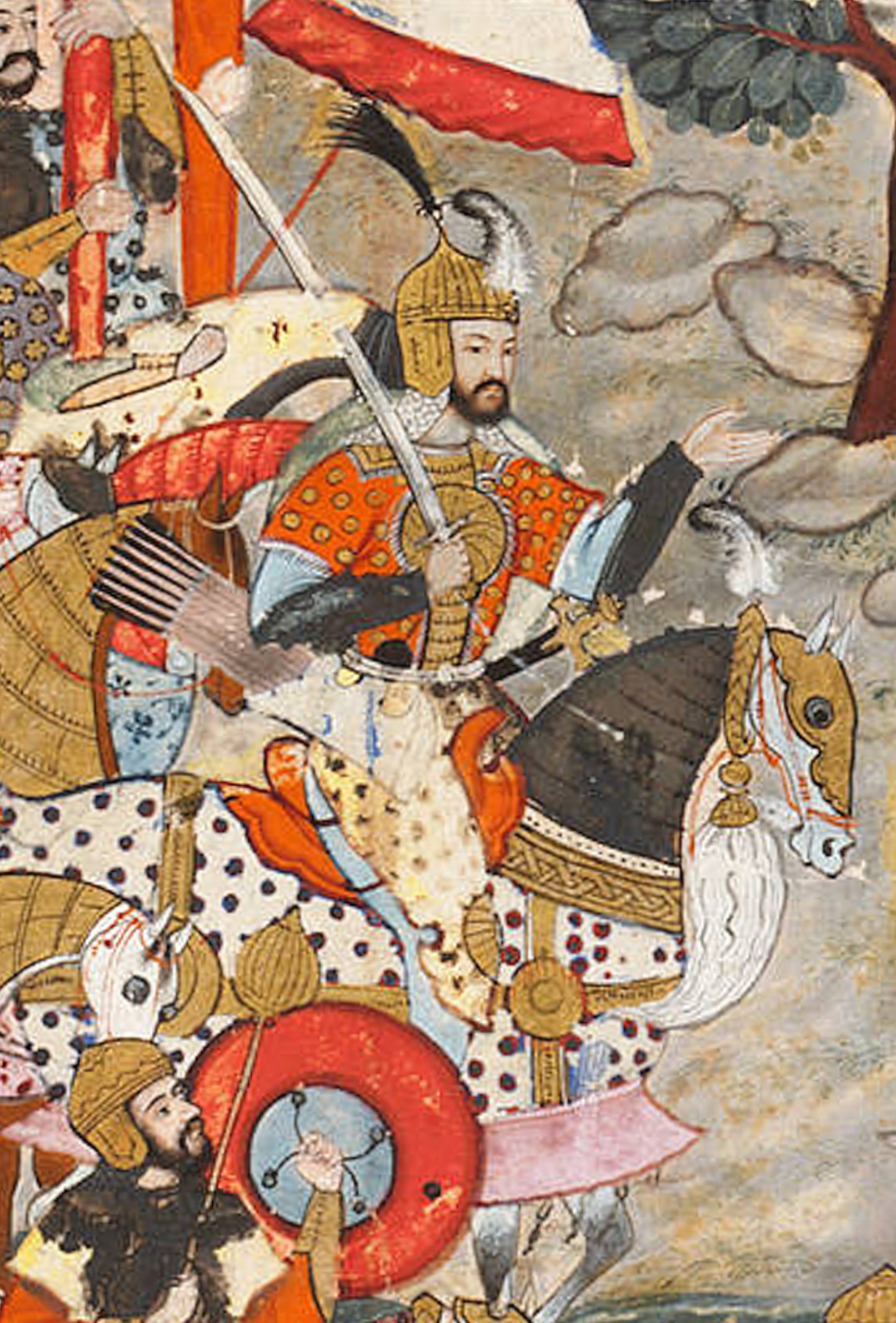
Mahmud Khan, son of Yunus Khan and uncle of Babur

After Shaikh Jamal was killed, Yunus Khan began actively participating (or intervening) in the affairs of the Timurids. He forged ties of kinship with most of the prominent Timurids; three of Yunus Khan's daughters were given in marriage to three sons of his former mentor Abu Sa'id. Mihr Nigar Khanim was married to Sultan Ahmad Mirza; Qutlugh Nigar Khanum was married to Umar Shaikh Mirza II in 1475 (their son was Babur, founder of the Great Moghul Empire in India), and finally, Sultan Nigar Khanum was given in marriage to Sultan Mahmud Mirza (their son, Sultan Vais Mirza, better known as Mirza Khan, would become king of Badakhshan). Yunus Khan kept on especially friendly terms with his second son-in-law, Umar Shaikh Mirza II, and it was Umar Shaikh who usually gave his father-in-law territory to reside in during the winters (the Timurids were settled in towns and ruled the attached provinces; Yunus Khan, after having promised his amirs to maintain the nomadic lifestyle, kept his word). Being of a rather unworldly and poetic temperament, Umar Shaikh II often needed the help of his father-in-law to deal with his own elder brother, Ahmad Mirza, with whom his relations had been bad since childhood for no particular reason. Yunus Khan often intervened to iron out the issues between his two sons-in-law.

== Later years ==
In 1484, Yunus Khan took advantage of one of the periodic conflicts between Sultan Ahmad and Umar Shaikh Mirza II to take possession of Tashkent. He was almost seventy years old by this time, and was once again yearning to give up the nomadic lifestyle for a settled life in some town. This had been a constant issue for him, due to the fact that his life until almost the age of forty had been spent in large cosmopolitan Persian cities like Yazd and Shiraz. Tashkent, an important city along the silk route, and cosmopolitan enough to rival the cities of Persia and was as good as it could get in central Asia. His decided to live in the city for at least a prolonged period, a decision which upset the other Moghuls, and many of them left for Moghulistan under the leadership of Yunus' own son Ahmad Alaq. Yunus Khan was also unable to prevent the rise of the Dughlat Mirza Abu Bakr, who had earlier taken Yarkand, Khotan and Kashgar from other members of his family, and defeated Yunus Khan's attempts to quell him. During the Ming Turpan Border Wars he had taken Hami in 1473, but the Chinese evicted him into Turfan.

Yunus Khan died in Taskhent in 1487 after a long illness. He was succeeded in Tashkent by his eldest son, Sultan Mahmud Khan, while the Moghuls in the east followed Ahmad Alaq.

== Paternal lineage ==
Genealogy of Chaghatai Khanates

In Babr Nama written by Babur, Page 19, Chapter 1; described genealogy of his maternal grandfather Yunas Khan as:

Yunas Khan descended from Chaghatai Khan, the second son of Chingiz Khan (as follows,) Yunas Khan, son of Wais Khan, son of Sher-'ali Aughlon, son of Muhammad Khan, son of Khizr Khwaja Khan, son of Tughluq-timur Khan, son of Aisan-bugha Khan, son of Dawa Khan, son of Baraq Khan, son of Yesuntawa Khan, son of Muatukan, son of Chaghatai Khan, son of Chingiz Khan.

In the Tarikh-i Rashidi by Mirza Muhammad Haidar Dughlat:

Yunus Khán was the son of Vais Khán, son of Shir Ali Oghlán, son of Muhammad Khán, son of Khizir Khwája Khán, son of Tughluk Timur Khán. I have never heard the date of his birth, but from the date of his death and the length of his days, it may be inferred that he was born in the year 819 of the Hajra [1416], but God alone knows.

Genealogy of Younas Khan/Haji Ali according to Mirza Muhammad Haidar Dughlat
1. Chingiz Khan (known in the west as Genghis Khan); 2. Chaghatai Khan; 3. Mutukan; 4. Yesü Nto'a; 5. Ghiyas-ud-din Baraq; 6. Duwa; 7. Esen Buqa I	8. Tughlugh Timur; 9. Khizr Khoja; 10. Muhammad Khan (Khan of Moghulistan); 11. Shir Ali Oglan; 12. Uwais Khan(Vaise Khan); 13. Yunus Khan, the subject of this page 14. Ahmad Alaq	15. Sultan Said Khan; 16. Abdurashid Khan; 17. Abdul Karim Khan (Yarkand)

== Ancestry ==
Ancestors of Yunus Khan

8. Muhammad Khan II, Khan of Moghulistan
4. Shir Ali Oglan
2. Uwais Khan, Khan of Moghulistan
5. Sultan Khatun
1. Yunus Khan, Khan of Moghulistan
12. Sari Bugha Jalayir
6. Shaikh Nuruddin Beg
3. Daulat Sultan Sakanj

== Notes ==
Preceded by Esen Buqa II	Moghul Khan; 1462–1487	Succeeded by Sultan Mahmud and Ahmad Alaq
