= Mahmud Khan (Moghul Khan) =

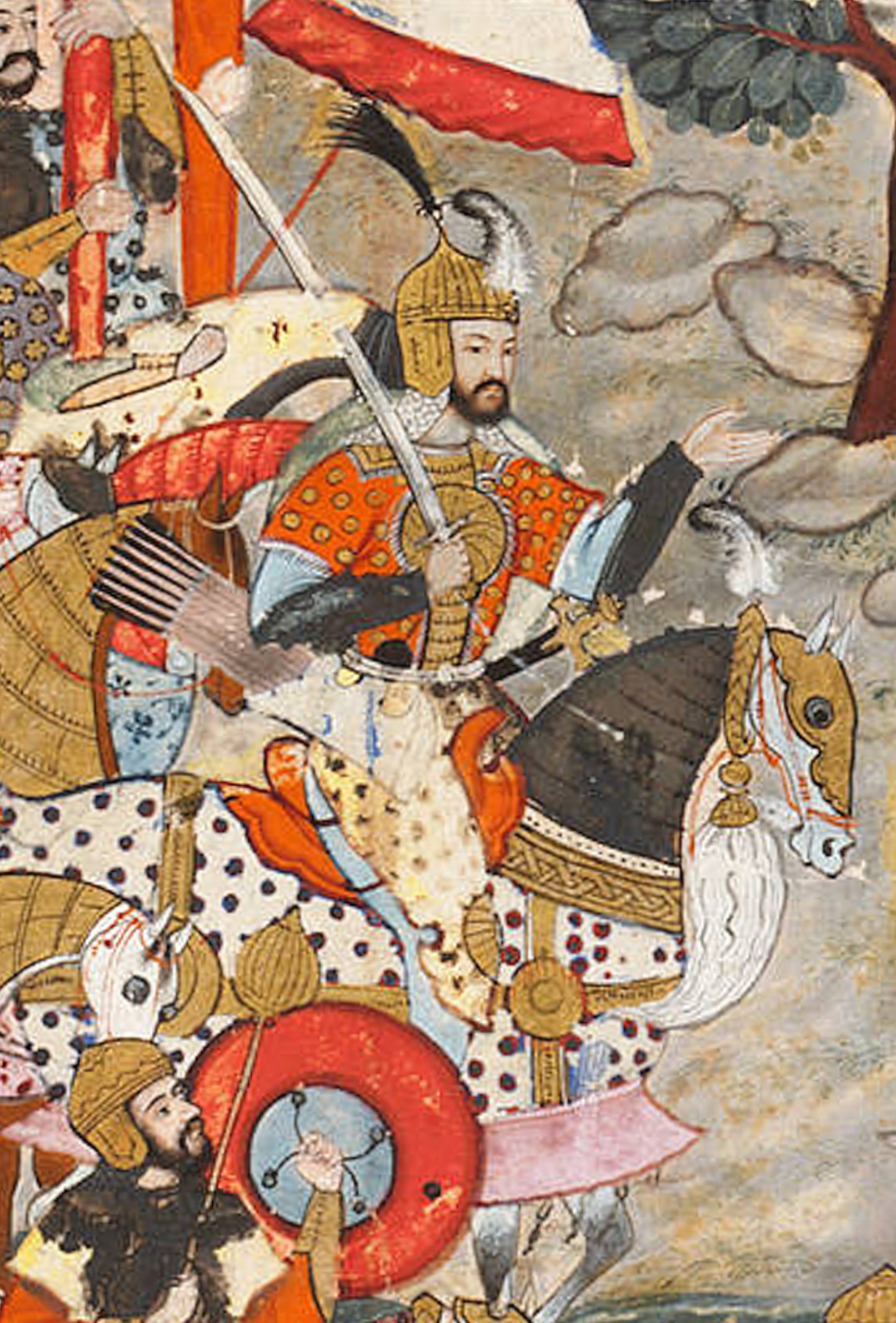
- Mahmud Khan in the Baburnama (1589)

Khan of Western Moghulistan
- Reign: 1487–1508
- Predecessor: Yunus Khan
- Successor: Mansur Khan
- Born: 1464
- Died: 1508 (aged 43–44)
- Spouse: Rabia Sultan Begum
- House: Borjigin
- Father: Yunus Khan
- Mother: Shah Begum
- Religion: Islam

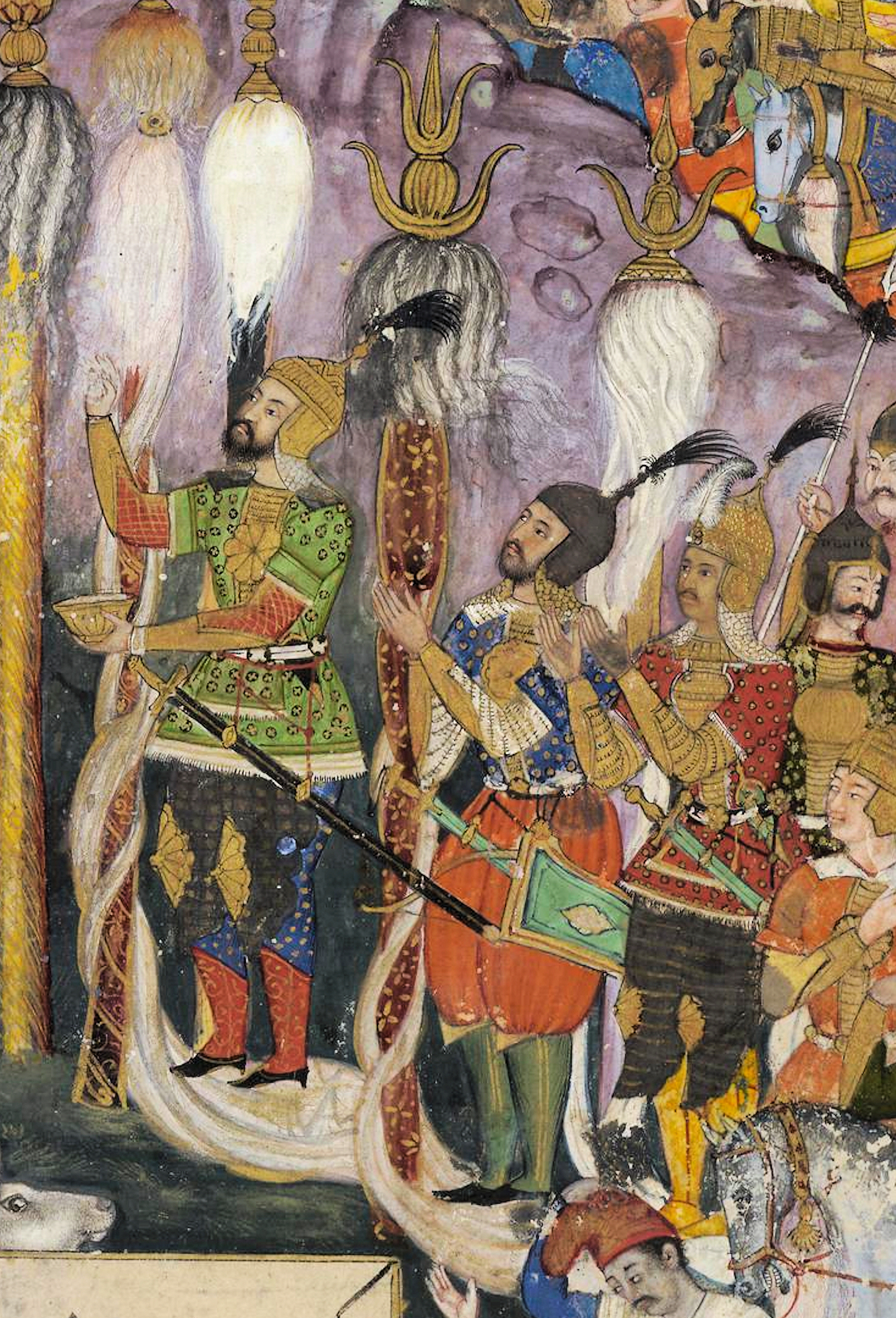
The Khan (Mahmud Khan), Babur, and Sultan Muhammad Khanika (son of Mahmud Khan) standing on the sacred strips of white cloth in 1502 at the "Acclamation of the Nine Standards". Baburnama (1589).

Sultan Mahmud Khan (Chagatai and Persian: سلطان محمود خان; b. 1464 – d. 1508), was Khan of Tashkent (1487–1502 or 1503) and of the Moghuls of western Moghulistan (1487–1508). He was the eldest son of Yunus Khan. He was born in 1464, his mother was Shah Begum, daughter of Badakhshan prince Lali (Shah Sultan Muhammad Badakhshi), who claimed his descent from Alexander the Great and gave one of his six daughters to Yunus Khan in marriage, pleasing his request.

Upon his father's death, Mahmud Khan succeeded him in Tashkent and western Moghulistan (present Kyrgyzstan), while his brother Ahmad Alaq had already taken control of eastern Moghulistan (present Xinjiang, China)

Mahmud Khan had to defend Tashkent from the Timurids Sultan Ahmad of Samarkand and Umar Shaikh of Ferghana, who resented the loss of the city to Yunus Khan a few years before. Mahmud Khan successfully thwarted their efforts to take Taskhent, and during his fight with Sultan Ahmad gained the defection of one of the men fighting under him, the Uzbek Muhammad Shaybani. As a reward to Muhammad Shaybani, Mahmud Khan gave him some land in 1488. This move, however, upset the Khazaks, who were enemies of the Uzbeks. Although the Moghuls were traditionally friends with the Khazaks, they went to war with each other, and Mahmud Khan was defeated.

Mahmud Khan maintained close and friendly relations with Dughlat Amir Muhammad Husain Mirza and gave his sister Khub Nigar Khanim in marriage to him in 1490, contracting an alliance. Their son was Mirza Muhammad Haidar Dughlat, famous historian and future ruler of Kashmir, born in Tashkent in 1500.

In the meantime, both Sultan Ahmad and Umar Shaikh died in 1494; their brother Sultan Mahmud ruled Samarkand for a six months but he died as well and the city passed to his son Baysunkur. Mahmud Khan attempted to wrest Samarkand from Baysunkur, but the Timurids were victorious on the battlefield.
Having failed to take Transoxiana himself, Mahmud Khan decided to support Muhammad Shaybani, whose forces sharply increased from 3,000 to 50,000. The Uzbeks took Samarkand in 1501, but soon turned against his Moghul supporters. With Muhammad Shaybani threatening Mahmud Khan, Ahmad Alaq came from the east and the two brothers advanced against the Uzbeks. They were, however, defeated in the Battle of Akhsi, 1503 and taken prisoner. Muhammad Shaybani let them go but retained the Moghul soldiers and seized control of Tashkent.

Shortly after the defeat, Ahmad Alaq died and his realm fell to his sons. Mahmud Khan invaded from the west with the remnants of his followers, but ignored the towns, settling in the steppes of Moghulistan. Here he lived a difficult life for five years, before deciding to present himself before Muhammad Shaybani, in the hope that he would show some favor to him. Muhammad Shaybani, however, had the khan and all of his five sons killed on the bank of Syr Darya river near Khujand in 1508.

== Family ==
Consort

- Rabia Sultan Begum, daughter of Sultan Ahmed Mirza and Qatak Begum, and mother of Baba Khan;

Sons
He had six sons, including:

- Sultan Muhammad Khan
- Baba Khan

Daughters
He had three daughters:

- Zainab Sultan Khanum, married to Sultan Said Khan Chaghatai;
- Aisha Sultan Khanum, married to Muhammad Shaybani;
- Qutlugh Khanum, married to Jani Beg Khan Uzbeg;

Preceded by Yunus Khan	Moghul Khan; 1487–1508	Succeeded by Mansur Khan (in western Moghulistan)
