= Daulat Sultan Khanum =

- Princess of Moghulistan
- Died: c. 1538
- Spouse: Timur Sultan Uzbeg
- Issue: a daughter
Names
- Daulat Sultan
- House: House of Borjigin
- Father: Yunus Khan
- Mother: Shah Begum
- Religion: Islam

Daultan Sultan Khanum (died c. 1538) was a princess of the Chagatai Khanate as a daughter of Yunus Khan, the Great Khan of Moghulistan and his second wife Shah Begum. She was also the half-aunt of Emperor Babur, the founder of the Mughal Empire of India as well as its first Emperor.

== Biography ==
Her paternal grandfather was Uwais Khan, the Moghul Khan of Mughalistan and her father's predecessor. Daulat Sultan was a direct descendant of Genghis Khan, the founder and Great Khan (Emperor) of the Mongol Empire through her father's side. Being the daughter of a Khan, Daulat Sultan held the title of "Khanum" ("daughter of a Khan or princess") by birth.

In 1501–02 she was in Tashkand, and her sister Qutlugh Nigar Khanum went to visit her after thirteen or fourteen years of separation. The latter's son Babur, dejected and an exile, joined the family party in the next year. In 1503 Shaibani Khan sacked Tashkand and forcibly married Daulat Sultan to his son Timur. They had a daughter, and she remained in his harem until Babur took possession of Samarkand in 1511, and she joined him. She went south with him in 1513, and remained several years in Badakhshan with another nephew, Mirza Wais Khan who behaved to her like a son.

Another nephew, Sa'id, her brother Ahmad's son, then invited her, with costly gifts, to visit him in Kashghar. She made the long and difficult journey, joined him in Yarkand, and with him she spent the rest of her life. Babur mentions that her foster brother brought him news and letters from her on September 8, 1519). In the same year Mansur, Sa'id's eldest brother, went to Kashghar to visit her, his "beloved aunt."

The Persian text of the Tarikh-i-rashidi says that Mansur went so that by looking at her kind face his grief for the loss of his father might be mitigated. The Bible Society's Turk! version reads: "Being prompted there to by the extreme warmth of his affection for her." Both statements illumine her character. The second seems the more appropriate, since the death of Sultan Ahmad Khan took place in 1503 and Mansur's visit in 1520.
