= Sultan Said Khan =

Ruler of the Yarkand Kahnate from 1514 to 1533

Khan of Yarkent Khanate (1514–1705)
- Reign: 1514–1533
- Predecessor: Mansur Khan
- Successor: Abdurashid Khan
- Born: 1487
- Died: 9 July 1533 (aged 45–46) near Karakoram Pass, likely Daulat Beg Oldi
- Issue: Abdurashid Khan; Iskander Sultan; Ibrahim Khan; Muhsin Khan; Mahmud Yusuf; Badi-ul-Jamal Khanum
- Dynasty: Borjigin
- Father: Ahmad Alaq
- Religion: Sunni Islam

Sultan Said Khan (Chagatai and Persian: سلطان سعید خان) ruled the Yarkent Khanate from September 1514 to July 1533. He was born in the late 15th century in Moghulistan, and he was a direct descendant of the first Moghul Khan, Tughlugh Timur, who had founded the state of Moghulistan in 1348 and ruled until 1363. The Moghuls were turkicized Mongols who had converted to Islam.

Some English sources refer to this ruler as Abusaid.

== Background ==
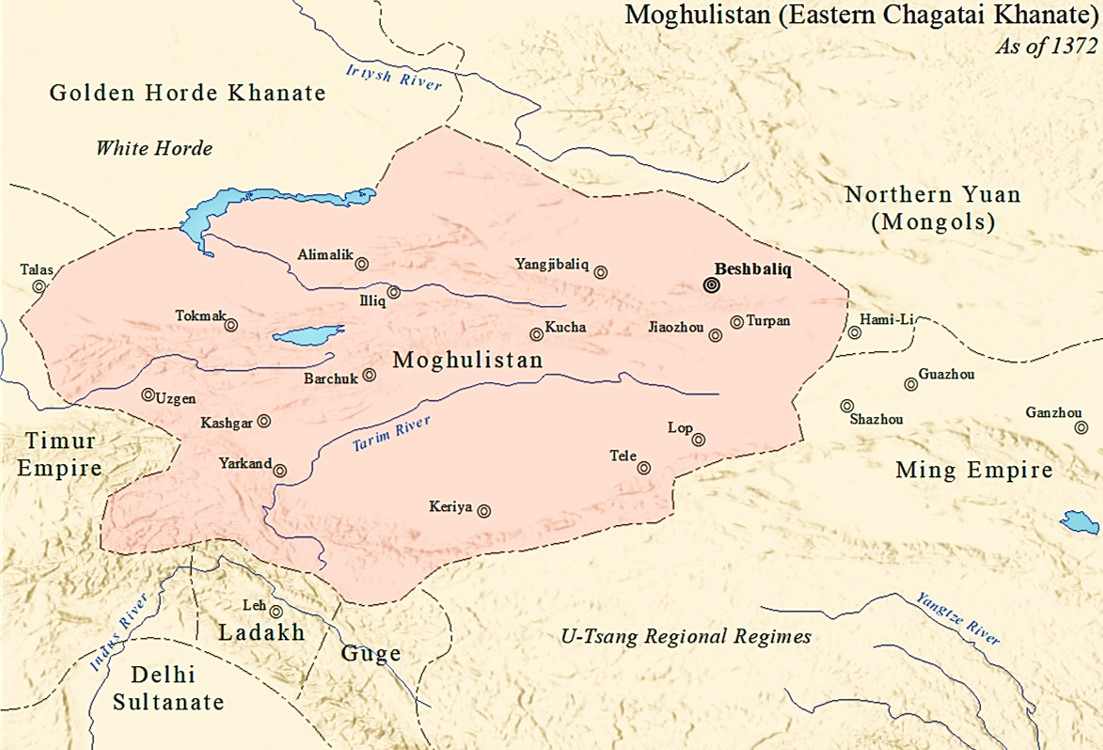
Moghulistan in around 1372 CE

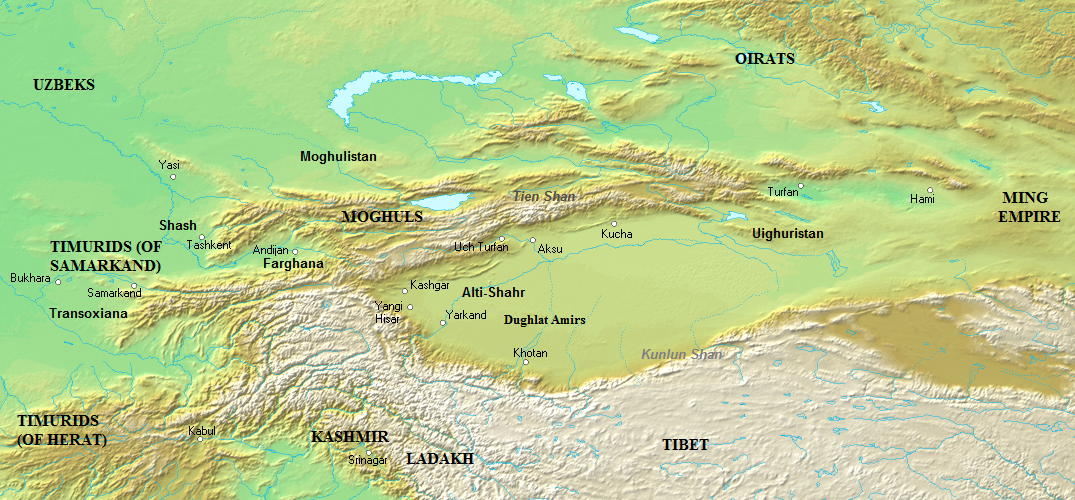
Central Asia in around 1450 CE

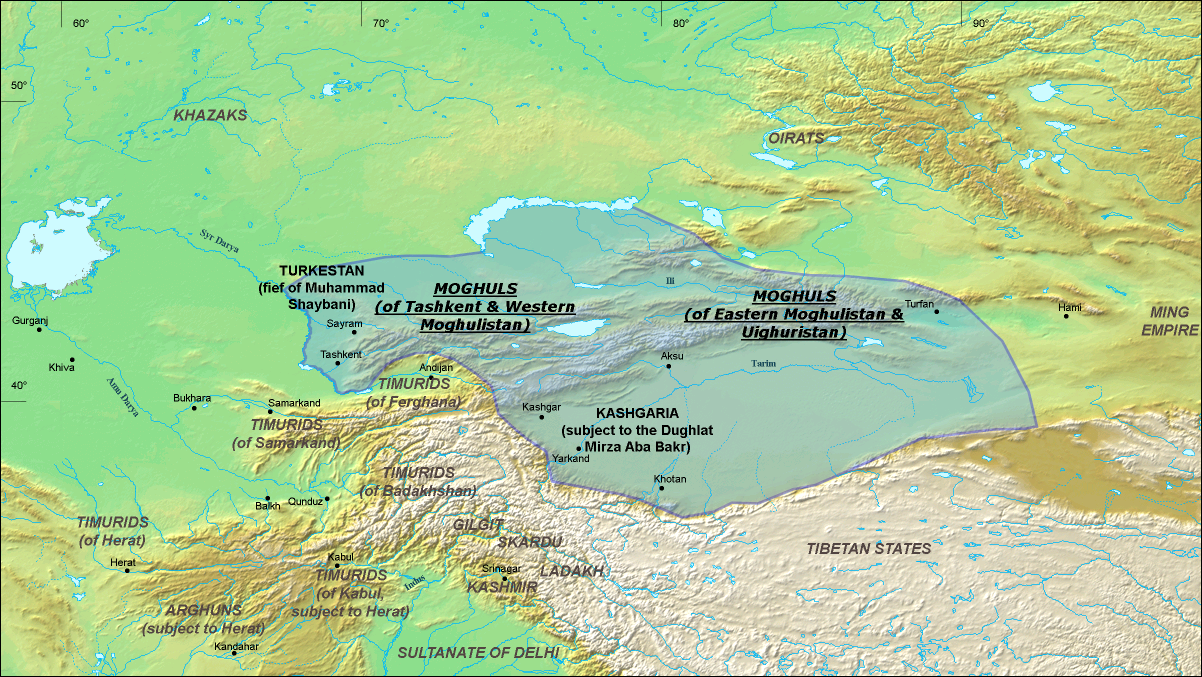
Central Asia in around 1490 CE

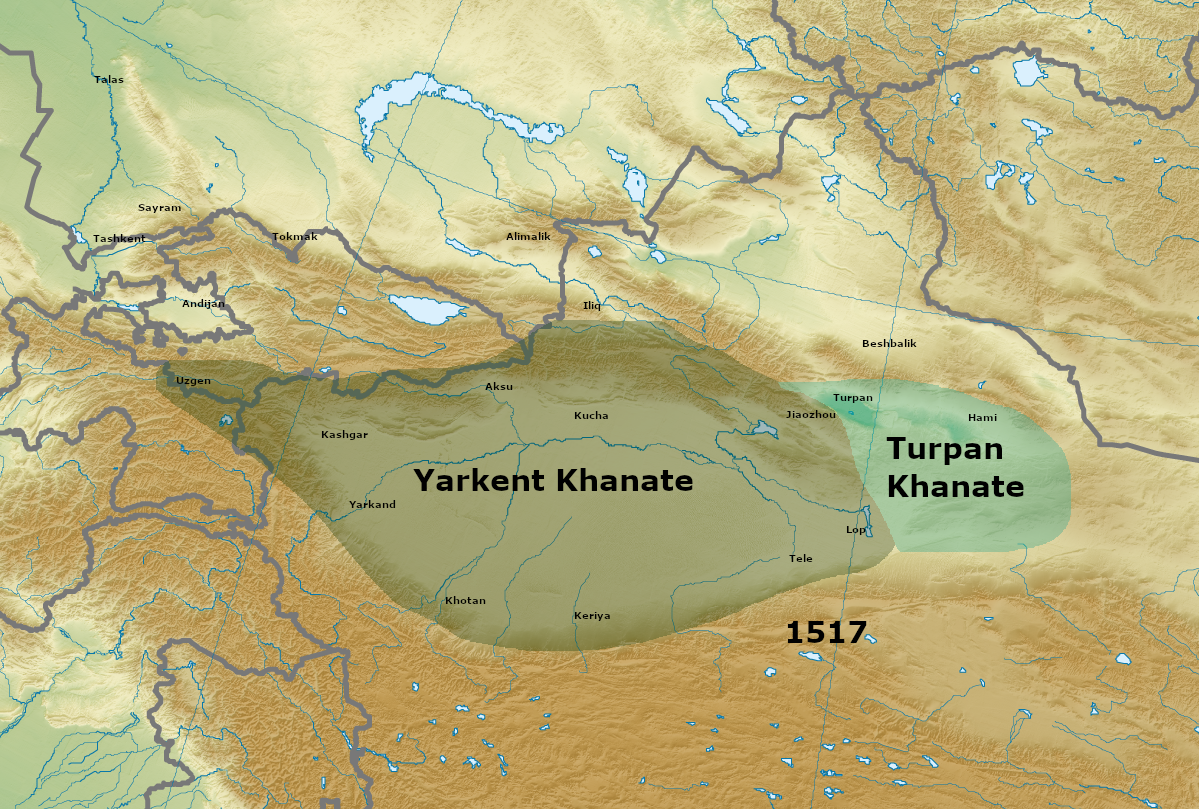
Yarkent and Turpan Khanates in 1517 at the beginning of rule of Sultan Said Khan (1514–1533)

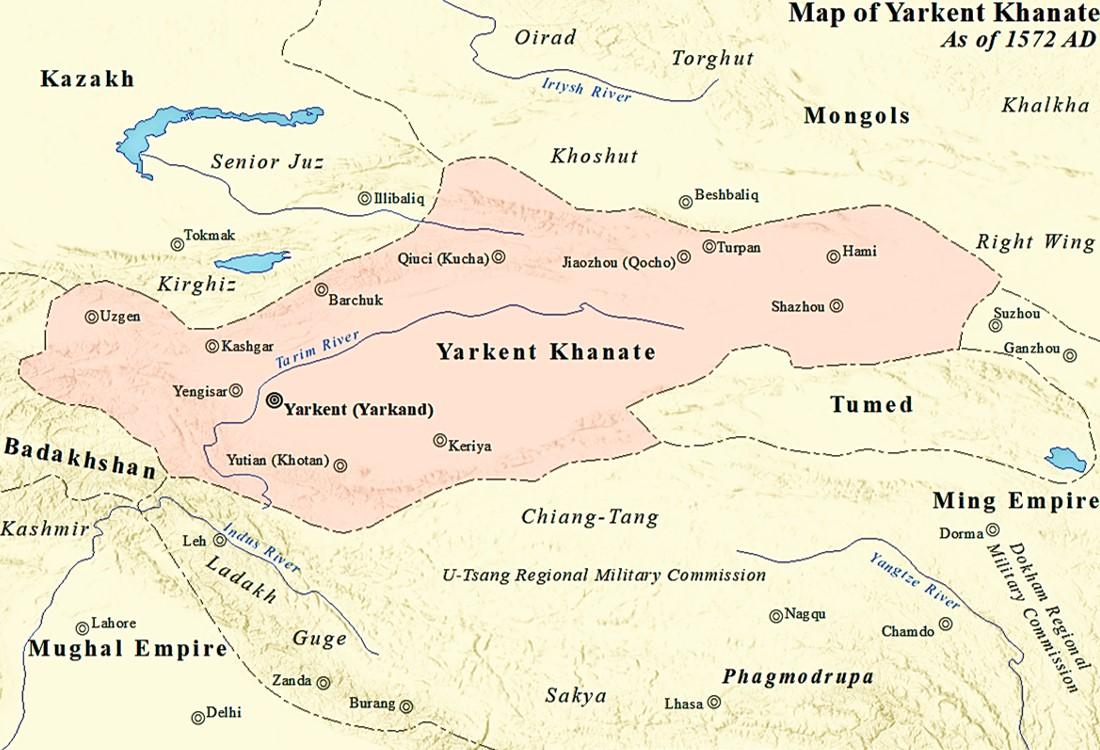
Yarkent Khanate in 1572 during rule of grandson of Sultan Said Khan Abdul Karim Khan(1560–1591)

Badakhshan in 1529 during dispute over its fate between Babur of Moghul Empire in India and Sultan Said Khan of Yarkand Khanate.

When the Chagatai ulus, which embraced both East and West Turkestan, collapsed, the result was the creation of two different states: Maverannahr in West Turkestan, with its capital at Samarkand, where Timur the Great came to power in 1370, and Moghulistan, with its capital at Almalik, near the present-day town of Gulja, in the Ili valley. Moghulistan embraced settled lands in Eastern Turkestan as well as nomad lands north of Tangri Tagh. The settled lands were known at the time as Manglai Sobe or Mangalai Suyah, which translates as Shiny Land, or Advanced Land Which Faced the Sun. These lands included west and central Tarim oasis-cities, such as Khotan, Yarkand, Yangihisar, Kashgar, Aksu, and Uch Turpan; and hardly involved eastern Tangri Tagh oasis-cities, such as Kucha, Karashahr, Turpan and Kumul, where a local Uyghur administration and Buddhist population still existed. The nomadic areas comprised the present Kyrgyzstan and part of Kazakhstan, including Jettisu, the area of seven rivers.

The ruler of Aksu, the dughlat emir Puladchi, brought a young, 18-year-old, Tughluk Timur from the Ili valley in 1347, and in a kurultai declared him a grandson of Duwa Khan, the great-grandson of Chagatai Khan and ruler of the Chagatai Khanate between 1282 and 1307. Puladchi forced all moghuls to recognize Tughluk as Khan. Khans from Chagatai, the second son of Genghis Khan, to Tughluk Timur are known as "Chagatai khans", and from Tughluk Timur to his descendants as "Moghul khans".

Moghulistan existed around 100 years, and then split into three parts: Yarkand state (mamlakati Yarkand), with its capital at Yarkand, which embraced all the settled lands of Western Kashgaria, still nomad Moghulistan which embraced the nomad lands north of Tengri Tagh, and Uyghurstan which embraced the settled lands of Eastern Kashgaria, Turpan and Kumul Basins. The founder of Yarkand state was Mirza Abu Bakr, who was from the dughlat tribe. In 1465, he raised a rebellion, captured Yarkand, Kashgar, and Khotan, and declared himself an independent ruler, successfully repelling attacks by the Moghulistan rulers Yunus Khan and his son Akhmad Khan, or Ahmad Alaq, named Alach, "Slaughterer", for his war against the kalmyks. In 1462 moghul khan Dost Muhammad took residency in Aksu, denying nomad style of life, and as result Eastern Kashgaria cities, such as Aksu, Uchturpan, Bai, Kucha, Karashar, and also Turpan and Kumul, separated into Eastern Khanate or Uyghurstan.

Dughlat emirs had ruled the country that lay south of Tangri-Tagh in the Tarim Basin from the middle of the thirteenth century, on behalf of Chagatai Khan and his descendants, as their satellites. The first dughlat ruler, who received lands directly from the hands of Chagatai, was amir Babdagan or Tarkhan. The capital of the emirate was Kashgar, and the country was known as Mamlakati Kashgar. Although the emirate, representing the settled lands of Eastern Turkestan, was formally under the rule of the moghul khans, the dughlat emirs often tried to put an end to that dependence, and raised frequent rebellions, one of which resulted in the separation of Kashgar from Moghulistan for almost 15 years (1416–1435).

Mirza Abu Bakr ruled Yarkand for 48 years. His reign is particularly noted for the establishment of a distinctive and highly organized penal labor system, which has been described as unprecedented in the region. According to historical accounts, after the accidental discovery of 29 large bowls containing gold dust and silver balysh coins during excavations in the old city of Yarkand, Mirza Abu Bakr ordered systematic excavations to be carried out in ancient urban sites throughout his realm, including abandoned settlements in the Taklamakan Desert.

To provide the necessary workforce, he employed convicts of both sexes and of all ages as forced laborers. Excavation sites, known as kazyk, were equipped with numerous barracks for prisoners and guards. Convicts were transported to these sites from across the country in successive groups, and excavation work continued year-round without interruption. Through this extensive system of forced labor, Mirza Abu Bakr accumulated substantial quantities of treasure and acquired numerous rare and valuable artifacts, some of which were reportedly hundreds or even thousands of years old.

In May 1514, Sultan Said Khan, grandson of Yunus Khan (ruler of Moghulistan between 1462 and 1487) and the third son of Akhmad Khan, made an expedition against Kashgar from Andijan with only 5,000 tribesmen (who represented 9 Moghul tribes- Dughlat, Duhtui, Barlas, Yarki, Ordabegi, Itarchi, Konchi, Churas and Bekchi), and having captured the Yangihisar citadel, that defended Kashgar from south road, took the city, dethroning Mirza Abu Bakr. Soon after, other cities of Yarkand state – Yarkand, Khotan, Aksu, and Uch Turpan – joined him, and recognized Sultan Said Khan as a ruler, creating a union of six cities, called Altishahr. Sultan Said Khan's sudden success is considered to be contributed to by the dissatisfaction of the population with the tyrannical rule of Mirza Abu-Bakr and the unwillingness of the dughlat amirs to fight against a descendant of Chagatai Khan, and who decided, on the contrary, to bring the head of the slain ruler to Sultan Said Khan. This move put an end to almost 300 years of rule (nominal and actual) by the Dughlat emirs in the cities of West Kashgaria (1219–1514). Mirza Abu Bakr fled Yarkand for Ladakh with handful of his followers and 900 donkeys, loaded with his numerous treasuries, and being chased on his heels by Dughlat emirs and also Barlas emirs, sent by Sultan Said Khan. They almost reached him in Karangu Tagh Mountains, but Mirza Abu Bakr managed to escape by killing all 900 donkeys and dumping all treasuries into Karakash River. During flight he found that all garrisons, that he previously deployed in Kashmir and Little Tibet (Ladakh), were deserted by his troops. So, he found it's impossible to stay in Ladakh, he decided to turn back and surrender to Sultan Said Khan but on half-way to Yarkand was captured and slaughtered by Dughlat emirs, who betrayed him.

== Life ==
At this time, almost all of West Turkestan (Maverannahr) was invaded by nomadic Uzbeks of Shaybani Khan, who were killing all the descendants of Timur the Great and Chagatai Khan. Sultan Said Khan saved his life when he moved to Kashgar with his nobles. In 1516, he concluded a peace agreement with his older brother Mansur Khan, the moghul khan of Chalish and Turpan (Uyghurstan), who died in 1543. As a result, the eastern part of the settled country south and partly north of Tangri-Tagh joined his state, including the cities of Bai, Kucha, Chalish (Karashahr), Urum (Urumchi), Turpan, Kumul, and Shazhou (Dunhuang), representing those lands of former Uyghuria (856–1335) that were known as the Fifth Ulus of the Mongol Empire in the middle of the thirteenth century, because the former ruler of Uyghuria, idikut Baurchuk Art Tekin married Altun Begi, the daughter of Genghis Khan, and was declared by Genghis as his fifth son in 1211.

Relations between Yarkand Khanate and Ming dynasty China were not developed, although the far eastern boundaries of Yarkand reached the Jiayuguan Pass at the western end of the Great Wall of China due to holy expeditions of Mansur Khan, including expeditions against the Sarigh Uyghurs – Yellow Uyghurs or Uyghurs of yellow religion, called Yugurs, who worshipped Tibetan Buddhism and took refuge in Gansu province of Ming China in 1529, fleeing the holy warriors of Mansur Khan. This situation can be partly explained by the full extinction of Silk Road trade by this time.

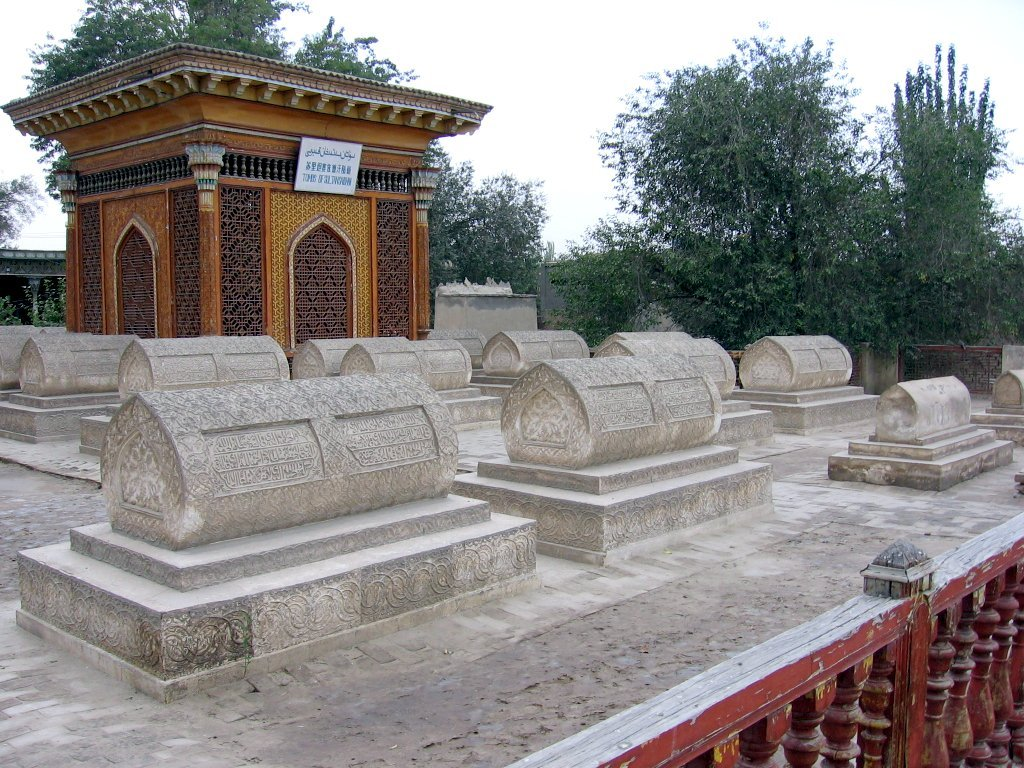
Royal Cemetery Altyn of Moghul Khans of Yarkand Khanate (1465–1705) in Yarkand with tombs of Sultan Said Khan (1514–1533), Abdurashid Khan (1533–1560), Abdul Karim Khan (1560–1591), Muhammad Khan (1591–1609), Shudja ad-Din Ahmad Khan (1609–1618), Sultan Abdal Latif (Afak Khan) (1618–1630) and other members of this dynasty

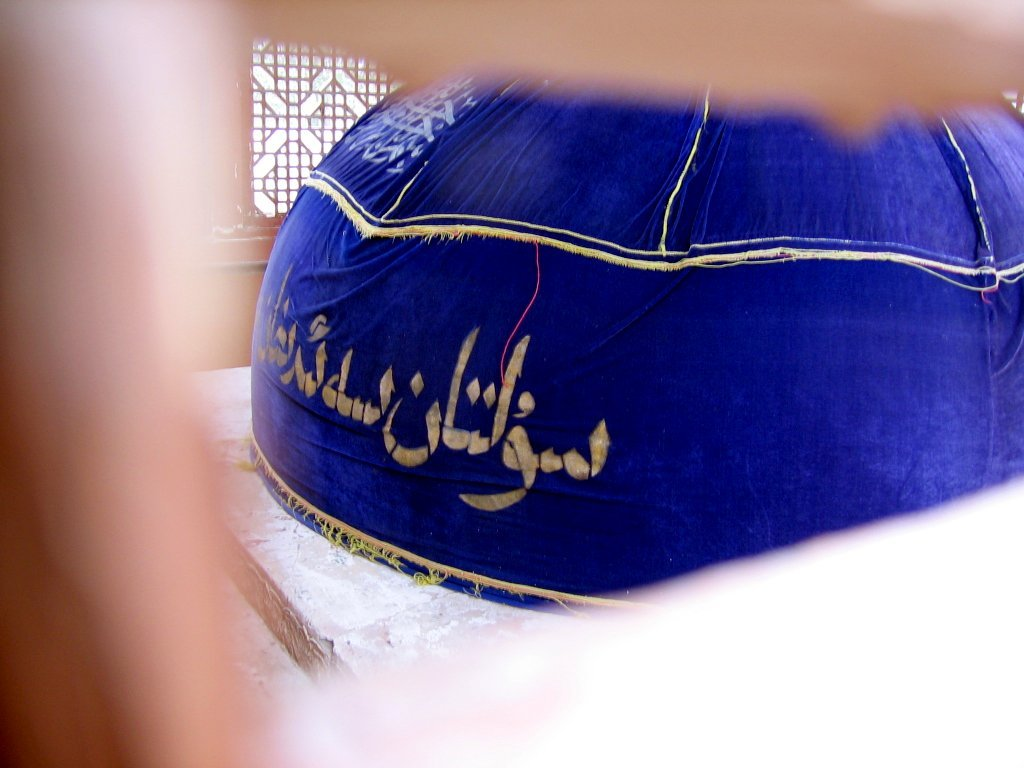
Tomb of Sultan Said Khan in Royal Cemetery Altyn (Golden) of Moghul Khans in Yarkand

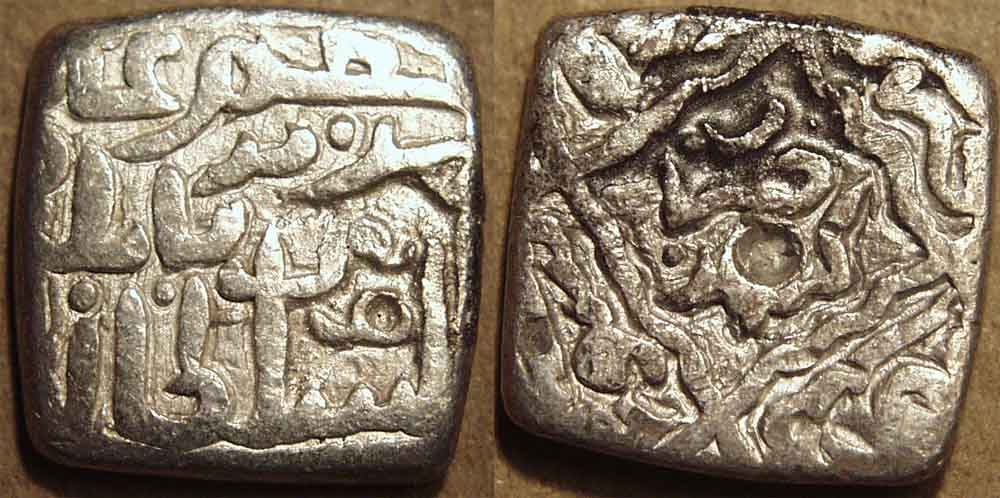
Silver sasnu issued in 1533 in Kashmir by Haidar Dughlat, in the name of Said Khan. The obverse legend reads al-sultan al-a'zam mir sa'id khan.

Before his death during almost 20 years of ruling he united all the settled country south of Tangri Tagh, from Kashgar to Kumul, into one centralized state- Yarkand Khanate with a population of the same origin and language. Also such mountainous regions as Kashmir and Bolor became dependencies of Yarkand Khanate, paid tributes and struck silver and golder coins under name "Abul Fath Sultan Said Khan Ghazi". The contemporary writer dughlat amir Mirza Muhammad Haidar stated that it was a time when the Power of Tyranny (the rule of Mirza Abu Bakr) had been changed to the Power of Law and Order during the rule of Sultan Said Khan. Theft of property was considered a high crime and was subject to severe punishment, including execution. Peasants were encouraged to leave their tools in the fields after work, and household owners to keep the doors of their houses unlocked. Foreign traders, upon arrival to any town, could leave their luggage dumped directly on the road and, after taking a rest for several days and returning, they could find their goods in the same place – safe and untouched.

Said Khan had a close relationship with Babur, his cousin and founder of the Mughal Empire across the Himalayas and Karakoram Range from the Yashkent Khanate.

Sultan Said Khan is sometime mentioned with title of Ghazi for his military expeditions. The reign of Sultan Said Khan was heavily influenced by the khojas.

His reign included a campaign in Bolor in 1527–1528 with his son Rashid and Mirza Muhammad Haidar in the command of troops, and a raid into Badakhshan in 1529 upon the request of its inhabitants, who temporarily were left without ruler when sick Babur recalled his eldest son Humayun Mirza from Badakhshan (ruled Badakhshan in 1520–1528) to Agra to be his successor in case of his death and who recognized Sultan Said Khan rights on Badakhshan as a grandson of Shah Begum. When Sultan Said Khan came to Badakhshan he found that youngest son of Babur Hindal Mirza was already sitting in Zafar fortress, capital of Badakhshan, while Mirza Muhammad Haidar, who was sent to Badakhshan in advance with troops, was besieging the fortress. The siege of the Zafar fortress lasted 3 months during which Babur assembled State Council in Agra and it was decided on it to avoid a war between Moghul Empire and Yarkent Khanate, Hindal Mirza was recalled to Agra and Suleiman Shah, son of the former ruler of Badakhshan Mirza Wais Khan, who died in 1520 and was a son of Timurid Sultan Mahmud Mirza and Sultan Nigar Khanum, daughter of Yunus Khan and Shah Begum, was restored as a lawful ruler of Badakhshan.

=== Expedition into Ladakh and death ===
Said Khan launched looting expeditions into Ladakh and Kashmir in 1532. The account of this military expedition was recorded by his general Mirza Muhammad Haidar Dughlat, who was the Sultan's first cousin, in the work of history Tarikh-i-Rashidi (تاریخ رشیدی) (History of Rashid).

In Autumn of 1531 (Safar 938 AH), the Sultan Said Khan left Yarkand with Haidar and a few thousand men. Upon first time crossing the Karakorum, the Sultan encountered severe altitude sickness, but he managed to recover. In the course of a few months of campaigning, they were able to devastate Nubra Valley. As winter approached, they split forces. The Sultan left for Baltistan; Haidar left for Kashmir. In Baltistan, the Sultan encountered a population of friendly Muslims, but he turned them killing and enslaving them, possibly because they were Shiites which was heretic to orthodox Yarkandi Sunnis. On the way to Kashmir, Haider defeated the Dras near Zoji La. In Kashmir, he and his troops were hosted by the king of Srinagar. In the spring, the two parties met up again in Maryul, the Sultan decided to return to Yarkand, but he instructed Haider to conquer Tibet for Islam before his departure.

Sultan Said Khan purportedly died at Daulat Beg Oldi while returning to Yarkent. He died in 1533 of a high-altitude pulmonary edema. Henry Walter Bellew argues that the location of his death was here at Daulat Beg Oldi. The news of Sultan's death led to a bloody succession which saw the ascension of Abdurashid Khan. Abdurashid Khan recalled the forces in Tibet and exiled Haidar. By then, Haidar had some successes against the Changpa Tibetans of Baryang, but his forces suffered greatly from the altitude and elements. By the time the army returned to Yarkand, of the starting few thousands, less than a dozen were left. The exiled Haidar received the refuge from his maternal aunt in Badakhshan. He eventually joined the ranks of the Mughal Empire where he wrote the Tarikh-i-Rashidi.

== Aftermath ==
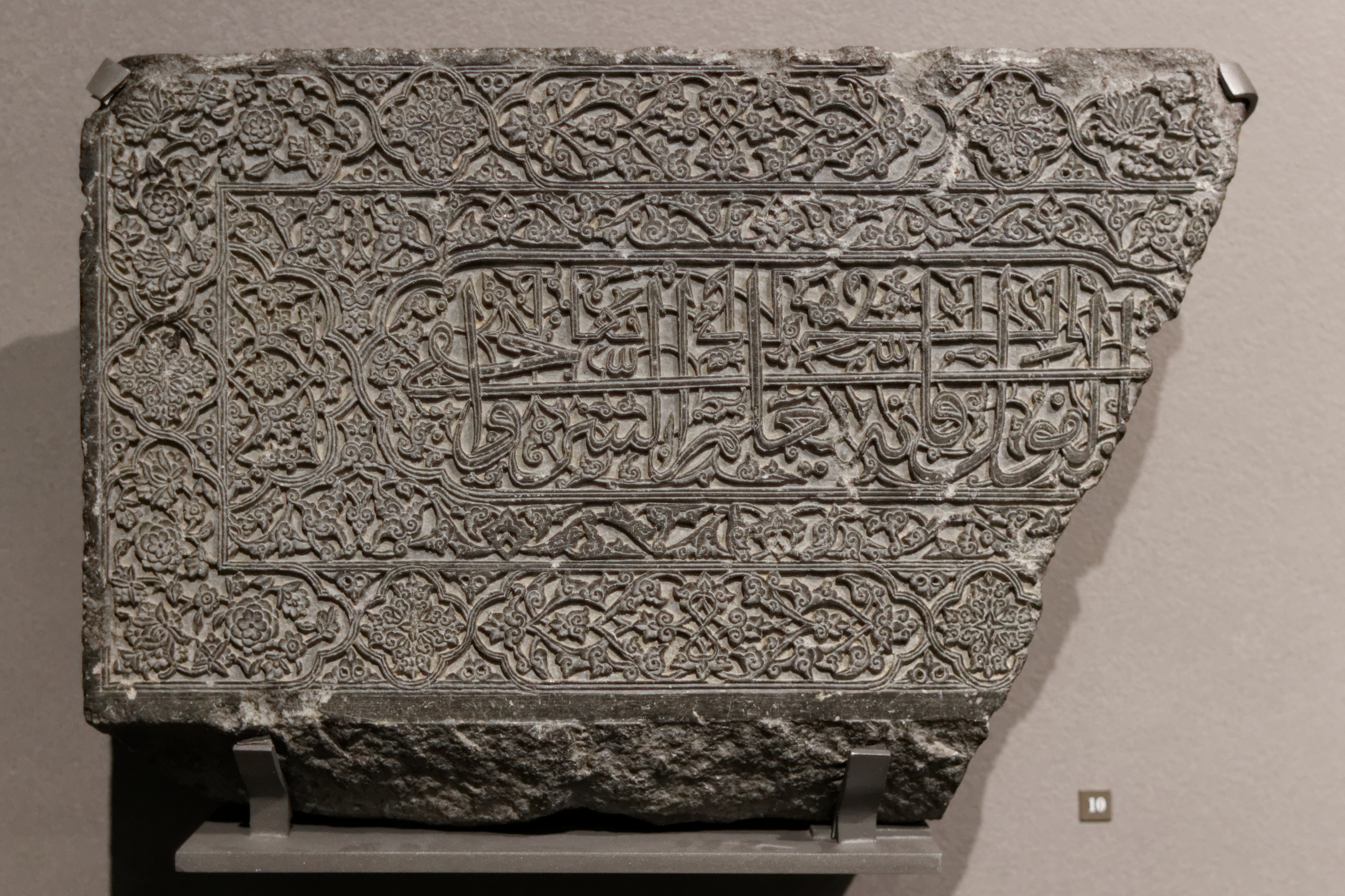
Tombstone in the name of Abu al-Ghazi Sultan Bahadir Khan (ruler of Khanate of Bukhara). Samarkand, 1530-1533. Louvre Museum MAO 342. Dedication: هذا مرقد السلطان السّلاطين العرب / والعجم صاحب الجود والكرم / المخصوص بعنايت الرّحمن أبو الغازي / سلطان سعيد بهادر خان إبن خاقان / المرحوم أبو الغازي أبو سعيد بهادرخان "This is the resting place of the Sultan of Sultans of the Arabs and Persians, the excellent and very generous, the guarantor of saint places, Abū al-Ġāzī Sulṭan Sa‘īd Bahādur Ḫān, son of the deceased ḫāqān Abū al-Ġāzī Sa‘īd Bahādur Ḫān".

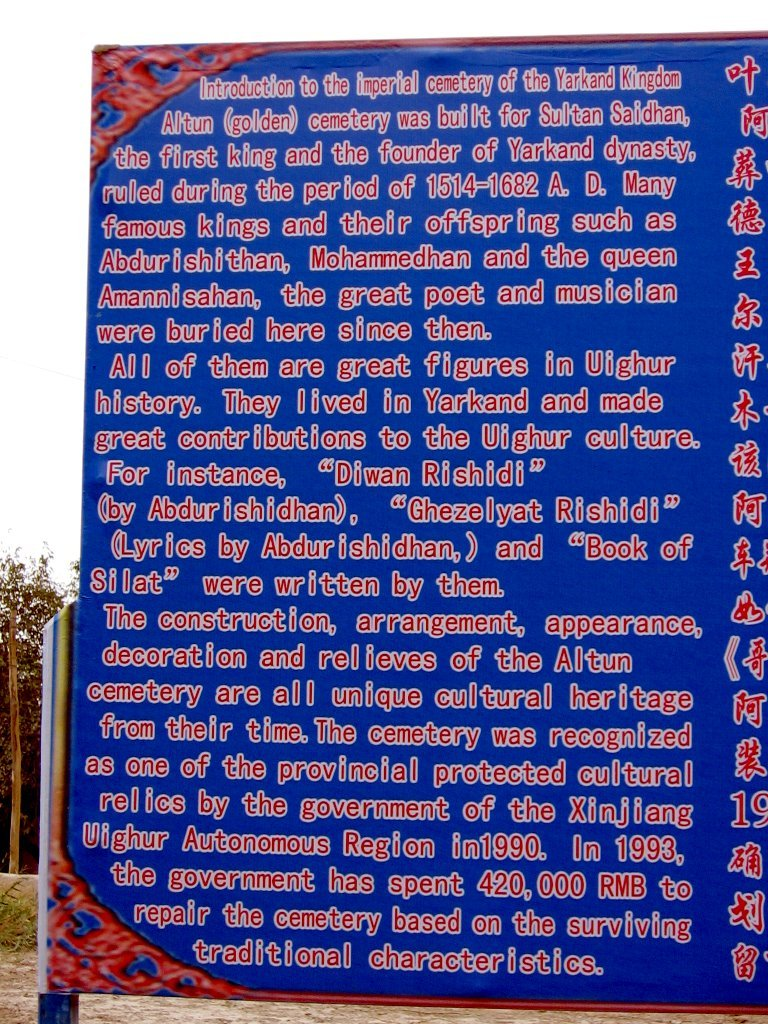
Introduction to the Imperial Cemetery Altun (Golden) of the Yarkand Kingdom in the city of Yarkand, 2005

Sultan Said Khan was succeeded in Yarkand by his son, Abdur Rashid Khan (Abdurashid Khan), who ruled from 1533 to 1560.

The historian Mirza Muhammad Haidar, in 1546, called the eastern part of the country the "Eastern Khanate or Uyghurstan" in his famous book Tarikh-i- Rashidi, written in Kashmir. The capital of this state was Yarkand, and it was known by the names mamlakati Saidiya, mamlakati Yarkand, and mamlakati Moghuliya in Iranian sources. The last name however was not accurate, because by this time the nomad state of Moghulistan had collapsed. It was eliminated during the fifteenth and sixteenth centuries by nomadic tribes of Kyrgyz, Kazakhs and Jungars, that captured all the Moghul lands north of Tangri Tagh. The remnants of the Moghuls (about 5,000 families mostly from Barlas, Churas and Arlat tribes) moved to Kashgaria and mixed with the local 1,000 000 Uyghur population, although a group of the Moghuls, numbering 30,000 men, joined Babur, a descendant of Timur the Great through his father Omar Sheikh Mirza, and a descendant of Chagatai Khan through his mother Kutluk Nigar Khanum, a daughter of the Moghul Yunus Khan, in Kunduz, in 1512, and helped him in his invasion of India. The Babur state in India was known as the Moghul Empire, and this state recognized Yarkand Khanate in 1529, (when Babur and Sultan Said Khan peacefully settled issue around Badakhshan, that was claimed by both cousins as their hereditary Land) as it did the Shaybanid state in Maverannahr, in 1538.

This country was later known as "Kashgar and Uyghurstan", according to Balkh historian Makhmud ibn Vali ("Bahr al-Asrar", Sea of Mysteries, 1641–1644). Kashgar historian Muhammad Imin Sadr Kashgari called the country Uyghurstan in his book Traces of Invasion (Asar al-futuh) in 1780 (as opposed to Jungaria, which he called Moghulistan, and the Ili River valley, which he called Baghistan, i.e. Land of Gardens). He wrote that this great country embraced a union of six cities south of Tangri Tagh – Kashgar, Yangihisar, Yarkand, Khotan, Aksu (Ardabil), and Uch Turpan (Safidkuh) – the so-called Altishahr, as well as Kucha, Chalish (Karashahr), Turpan and Kumul. According to him, the country collapsed not due to attacks by external enemies, but due to the personal ambitions of its religious leaders, the Khojas. The Khojas were divided into two hostile groups that hated and killed each other – the Ak Taghliks (White Mountaineers) and the Kara Taghliks (Black Mountaineers), who deposed one of the last Moghul Khans, Ismail Khan, in 1678, with the help of invited Kalmyks (Dzungars), and put the whole country under the feet of future invaders, including Dzungar Khanate and Qing dynasty of China, for gaining personal powers.

== Family ==
Consorts

- Zainab Sultan Khanum, daughter of Mahmud Khan Chaghatai and Said's favourite wife, mother of Ibrahim Khan, Muhsin Khan and Mahmud Yusuf;
- Makhduma Begum, sister of Suqar Bahadur Qaluchi, mother of Abdurashid Khan;
- Habiba Sultan Khanish, daughter of Muhammad Husayn Mirza Dughlat and Khub Nigar Khanum, daughter of Yunus Khan;

Children

- Abdurashid Khan;
- Iskander Sultan, married to a daughter of Muhammad Shah Mir of Kashmir Sultanate;
- Ibrahim Khan;
- Muhsin Khan;
- Mahmud Yusuf;
- Badi-ul-Jamal Khanum, married firstly to Baush Sultan of the Uzbeg Kazaks, married secondly to Muhammadi Barlas, a peasant;

== Genealogy of Moghul Khans of Yarkent Khanate ==
In Babr Nama written by Babur, Page 19, Chapter 1; described genealogy of his maternal grandfather Yunas Khan as:

"Yūnas Khān descended from Chaghatāī Khān, the second son of Chīngīz Khān (as follows,) Yūnas Khān, son of Wais Khān, son of Sher-'alī Aūghlān, son of Muḥammad Khān, son of Khiẓr Khwāja Khān, son of Tūghlūq-tīmūr Khān, son of Aīsān-būghā Khān, son of Dāwā Khān, son of Barāq Khān, son of Yīsūntawā Khān, son of Mūātūkān, son of Chaghatāī Khān, son of Chīngīz Khān"

1. Chengiz Khan (1206–1227); 2. Chagatai Khanate; 3. Chaghatai Khan (1226–1242); 4. Mutukan; 5. Yesü Nto'a; 6. Ghiyas-ud-din Baraq (1266–1271); 7. Duwa (1282–1307); 8. Esen Buqa I (1310–1318)	8. Moghulistan; 9. Tughlugh Timur (1347–1363); 10. Ilyas Khoja (1363–1368); 11. Khizr Khoja (1389–1399); 12. Shams-i-Jahan (1399–1408); 13. Muhammad Khan (Khan of Moghulistan) (1408–1415); 14. Naqsh-i-Jahan (1415–1418); 15. Shir Ali Oglan; 16. Uwais Khan (Vais Khan) (1418–1421, 1425–1429); 17. Sher Muhammad (1421–1425); 18. Esen Buqa II (1429–1462); 19. Dost Muhammad Khan (1462–1468), in Eastern Khanate or Uyghurstan; 20. Yunus Khan (1462–1487), in Western Moghulistan and since 1472 in Eastern Khanate (Uyghurstan) as well 21. Mahmud Khan (1487–1508), in Western Moghulistan; 22. Ahmad Alaq (1487–1503), in Eastern Khanate (Uyghurstan); 23. Mansur Khan (1503–1543), in Eastern Khanate {Uyghurstan}; 24. Sultan Said Khan (1508–1514), in Western Moghulistan	23. Yarkent Khanate; 24. Sultan Said Khan (1514–1533); 25. Abdurashid Khan (1533–1560); 26. Abdul Karim Khan (1560–1591); 27. Muhammad Khan (1591–1610); 28. Shudja ad Din Ahmad Khan (1610–1618); 29. Kuraish Sultan 1618; 30. Abdal Latif Khan (Afak Khan) (1618–1630); 31. Sultan Ahmad Khan (Pulat Khan) (1630–1633, 1636–1638); 32. Mahmud Sultan (Qilich Khan) (1633–1636); 33. Abdullah Khan (1638–1669); 34. Ismail Khan (1669, 1670–1678); 35. Yulbars Khan (1669–1670); 36. Abdal Latif Sultan (1670); 37. Abdar Rashid Khan II (1678–1682); 38. Muhammad Imin Khan (1682–1692); 39. Yahia Khoja, usurper (son of Appak Khoja) (1692–1695); 40. Hanim Padshah (sister of Muhammad Imin Khan) 1695; 41. Muhammad Mumin Khan (Akbash Khan) (1695–1705)	18. Turpan Khanate; 19. Chalish; 20. Turpan; 21. Kumul; 22. Dost Muhammad Khan (1462–1468); 23. Kebek Sultan (1468–1472); 24. Yunus Khan (1472–1487); 25. Ahmad Alaq (1487–1503); 26. Mansur Khan (1503–1543); 27. Shah Khan (1543–1570); 28. Koraish Sultan (1570–1588); 29. Muhammad Khan (1588–1591); 30. Abduraim Khan (1591–1594, 1605–1636); 31. Khudabende Sultan (1594–1605); 32. Abdullah Khan (1636–1638); 33. Abu'l Muhammad Khan (1638–1653); 34. Sultan Said Baba Khan (1653, 1655–1680); 35. Ibrahim Sultan (1653–1655); 36. Abdar Rashid Khan II (1680–1682); 37. Muhammad Imin Khan (1682–1690); 38. Muhammad Shah-i-Beg Tarkhan (1690–1697); 39. Kumul Khanate (1697–1930) Abdullah Beg Tarkhan (1697–1709); 40. Ghapur Beg (1709–1711); 41. Emin (1711-1740); 42. Yusup (1740-1767); 43. Ishaq (1767-1780); 44. Ardashir (1780-1813); 45. Bashir (1813-1867); 46. Muhammad Shah (1867-1882); 47. Maqsud Shah (1882-1930); 48. Nazir (1930-1934); 49. Bashir II (1934-1949)

== Moghulistan (Western and Eastern) ==
Preceded by Mansur Khan in Eastern Moghulistan and Mahmud Khan in Western Moghulistan	Moghul Khan (in Western Moghulistan); 1508	Succeeded by Abdurashid Khan in Yarkent Khanate

== List of Kumul Khanate Khans ==
The list of the Kumul Khanate Khans is as follows:

Generation	Name	reign years	information
1st generation	Abdullah Beg 額貝都拉 é-bèi-dōu-lā	1697－1709	In the 36th year of the Kangxi reign, he was granted the title of Jasagh Darhan of the First Rank. He died in the 48th year of Kangxi's reign.
2nd generation	郭帕 guō-pà, Gapur Beg	1709－1711	Abdullah Beg's eldest son. In the 48th year of Kangxi's reign he was granted the title of Jasagh Darhan of the First Rank. He died in the fiftieth year of Kangxi's reign.
3rd generation	Emin 額敏 É-mǐn	1711－1740	Gapur beg's eldest son. In the fiftieth year of Kangxi's reign he inherited the title of Jasagh Darhan of the First Rank. In the fifth year of Yongzheng's reign he was promoted to Zhenguo Gong (鎮國公) (Duke Who Guards the State); in the 7th year of Yongzheng's reign, he was promoted to Gushan Beizi (固山貝子) (Banner Prince). In the 5th year of Qianlong's reign he died.
4th generation	Yusuf 玉素甫 Yù-sù-fǔ or Yusup 玉素卜yù sù bǔ	1740－1767	Emin's eldest son. In the fifth year of Qianlong's reign he inherited the title of Jasagh Zhenguo Gong. In the 10th year of Qianlong's reign he was promoted to Gushan Beizi. In the 23rd year of Qianlong's reign he was granted the title of Beile pinji (貝勒品級). In the 24th year of Qianlong's reign, he was conferred the title of Duoluo Beile (多羅貝勒), and conferred the title of Junwang pinji (郡王品級). He died in the 12th month of the 31st year (January 1767).
5th generation	Ishaq 伊薩克 yī-sà-kè	1767－1780	Yusuf's second son. In the 32nd year of Qianlong's reign he inherited the title of Junwang pinji Jasagh Duoluo Beile. In the 45th year he died.
6th generation	Ardashir 額爾德錫爾 é-Ěr-dé-xī-ěr	1780－1813	Ishaq's eldest son. In the 45th year of Qianlong's reign, he inherited the title of Junwang pinji Jasagh duoluo beile. In the 48th year by imperial order he was granted permanent succession (all his descendants would automatically inherit his title). In the 18th year of the Jiaqing Emperor he died.
7th generation	Bashir 博錫爾 bó-xī-ěr	1813－1867	Son of é-Ěr-dé-xī-ěr. In the 18th year of Jiaqing's reign, he inherited (his father's titles). In the 12th year of Daoguang's reign, he was promoted to Duoluo Junwang 多羅郡王. In the third year of Xianfeng's reign, he was granted the title of Qinwang 親王. In the fifth year of Tongzhi's reign, the Dungan revolt broke out, but he stayed loyal (to the Qing). In the sixth year of Tongzhi's reign, he was posthumously granted the title of Hezhuo Qinwang 和碩親王.
8th generation	Muhammad 賣哈莫特 mài-hǎ-mò-tè	1867－1882	Son of bó-xī-ěr. In the sixth year of Tongzhi's reign he inherited the title of Jasagh Heshuo Qinwang. In the seventh year of Guangxu's reign, he died, leaving no one to succeed to his title.
9th generation	Maqsud Shah Maqsud Shah 沙木胡索特 shā-mù-hú-suǒ-tè	1882－1930	Muhammad's agnatic nephew. In the eighth year of Guangxu's reign he inherited his titles. In the fourth year of the Republic of China, his salary as qinwang was doubled. In the 19th year of the Republic of China on the sixth month on the sixth day, he died of illness.
10th generation	Nasir 聶滋爾 niè-zī-ěr	1930－1934	Maqsud Shah's second son. In the 19th year of the Republic of China on the 9th month on the 13th day he inherited his titles. In the 23rd year of the Republic he died.
11th generation	Bashir 伯錫爾 bó-xī-ěr	1934－1949	Nasir's eldest son. In the 23rd year of the Republic on the fourth month he inherited his titles. He was arrested and sent to prison. In 1951 he died while in prison.

== Bibliography ==
- Muhammad Haidar Dughlat (1895). Ney Elias (ed.). The Tarikh-i-Rashidi of Mirza Muhammad Haidar Dughlat: A HIstory of the Moghuls of Central Asia. Translated by Edward Denison Ross. London: Sampson Low, Marston and Company.
- Makhmud ibn Vali. "Bahr al-Asrar" (Sea of mysteries). Written in Balkh in 7 volumes in 1641–1644. Translated from the Balkh original text by B. Akhmedov. (Tashkent, 1977)
- Muhammad Imin Sadr Kashgari. Asar al-futuh (Traces of Invasion). Original manuscript (never published, written in 1780 in Samarkand in Uighur language by the exiled author) in custody of Uzbekistan Academy of Sciences, No.753, in Tashkent, Uzbekistan.
- Kutlukov, M. Mongol rule in Eastern Turkestan. (Moscow, Nauka, 1970)
- Kutlukov, M. About emergence of Yarkand state. (Almaty, Gylym, 1990)
