= Muhammad Husain Mirza Dughlat =

- Dughlat Prince; Mirza; Beg
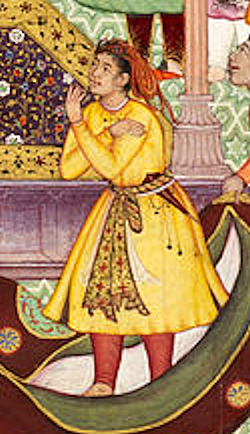
- Muhammad Husain Mirza Dughlat entangled in bedsheets, being presented to Timur. Baburnama, 1590
- Successor: Mirza Muhammad Haidar Dughlat
- Died: 1508
- Spouse: Khub Nigar Khanim; Sultanim Begum; A granddaughter of Mir Baranduk Barlas; A daughter of Saiyid Muhammad Arhangi
- Issue: Habiba Sultan Khanim; Gauhar Shah Begum; Mirza Muhammad Haidar Dughlat; Muhammad Shah; Abdullah Mirza five more sons with Khub Nigar Khanim; A daughter, married Baba Sultan, a grandson of Ahmad Alaq
- House: Chagatai
- Dynasty: Dughlat (through paternal lineage); Borjigin (through maternal lineage)
- Father: Hyder Mirza, Doghlat, Amir of Kashgar
- Religion: Sunni Islam
- Occupation: Ruler of Auratipa

Muhammad Husain Mirza Dughlat, of the Mongol Dughlats clan, also Muhammad Hussain Mirza Kurkan, was the eldest son of Hyder Mirza, Doghlat, Amir of Kashgar. Muhammad Husain Mirza married Khub Nigar Khanim (b. 1463), the younger sister of Babur's mother Qutlugh Nigar Khanum, so he was an uncle of Babur by alliance.

Circa 1501, Muhammad Husain Mirza was the ruler of the town of Auratipa. Babur, looking for a fief to govern, asked his uncle Mahmud Khan of Tashkent for some lands, so that "that my uncle in his condescension and graciousness would grant province or district". Mahmud Khan promised Babur the town of Auratipa, but Muhammad Husain Mirza refused to cede the town to Babur.

By 1504, Babur had taken control of Kabul, Muhammad Husain Mirza banded with Sultan Sanjar and Mirza Khan to conspire against Babur in Kabul in April–May 1507. The Baburnama relates relates how he got entangled in bedsheets while fleeing from Babur. Babur released him due to their family connection, but Muhammad Husain Mirza was finally killed in 1508 by the Uzbek leader Shaybani Khan.

He was the father of Mirza Muhammad Haidar Dughlat, a high officer of the Mughal emperor Babur, and creator of the Tarikh-i-Rashidi, a history of Central Asia. In his Tarikh-i-Rashidi, he greatly played down his father's treacherousness towards Babur.

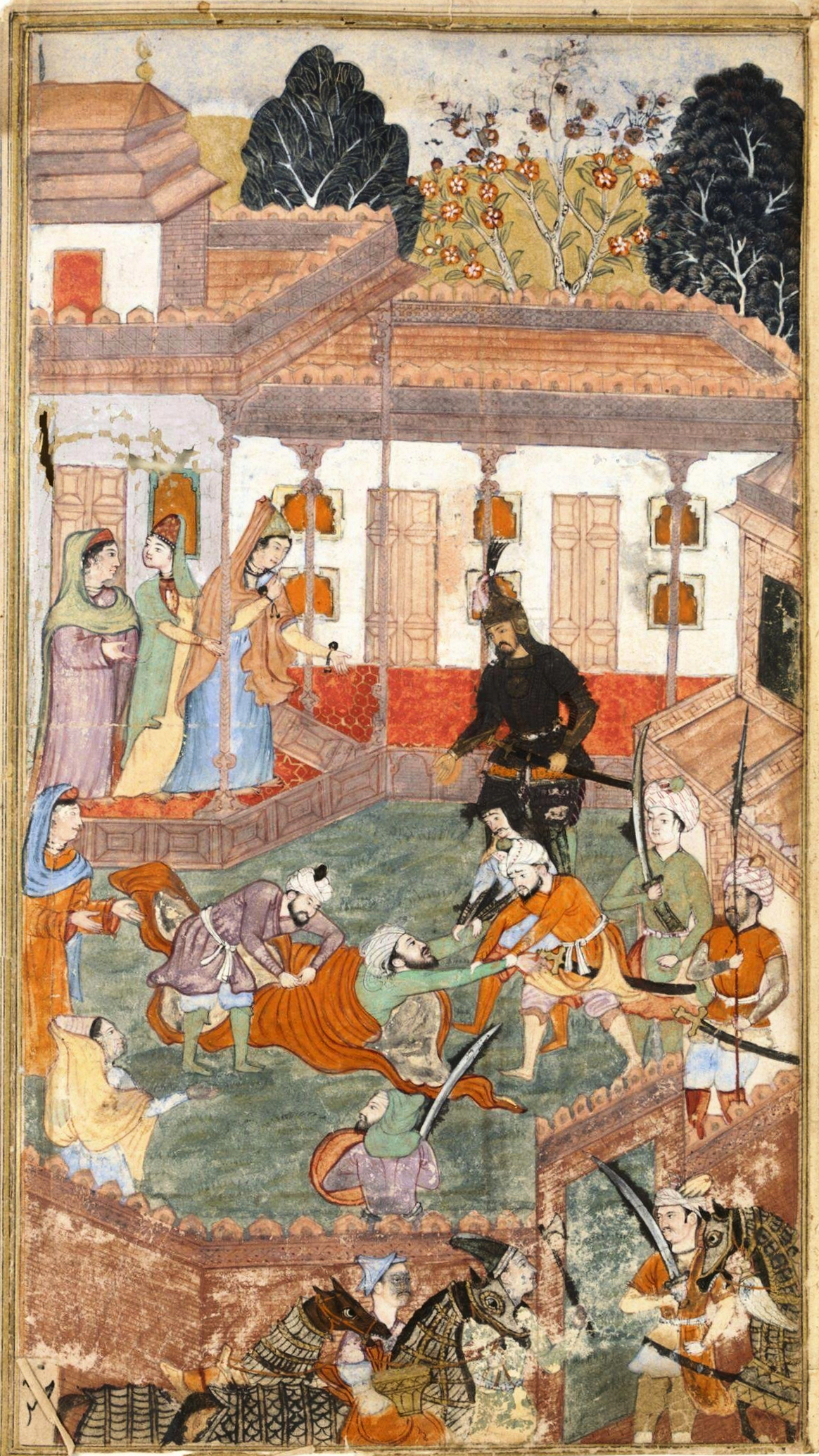
Babur in armour, witnessing Muhammed Husain Mirza entangled in bedding, having run into Khanini's bedding room, in April or early May, 1507.

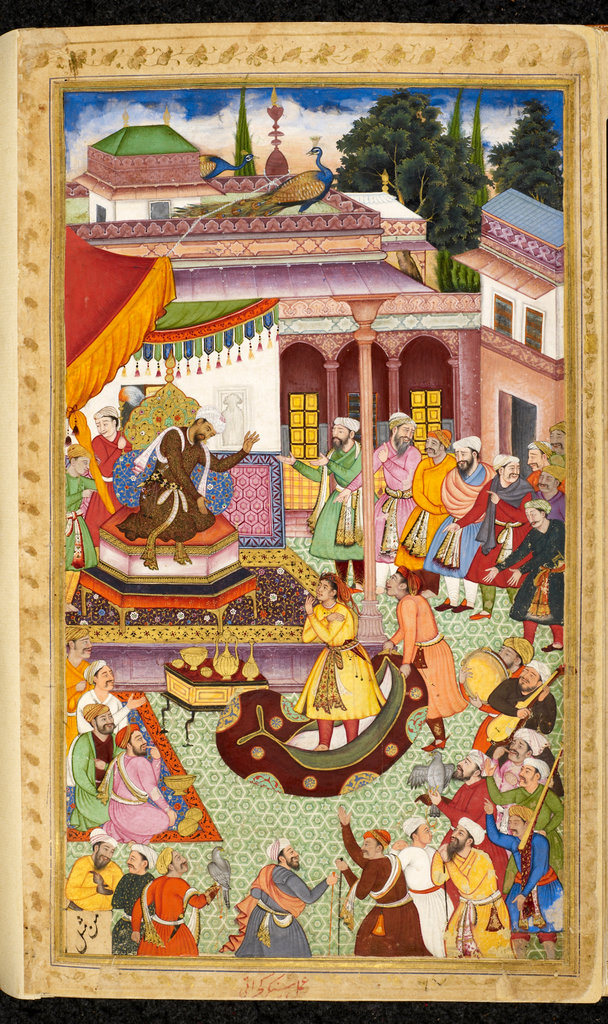
Muhammad Husain Mirza brought before Babur and laughing courtiers in the bedroll in which he tried to hide (1507)

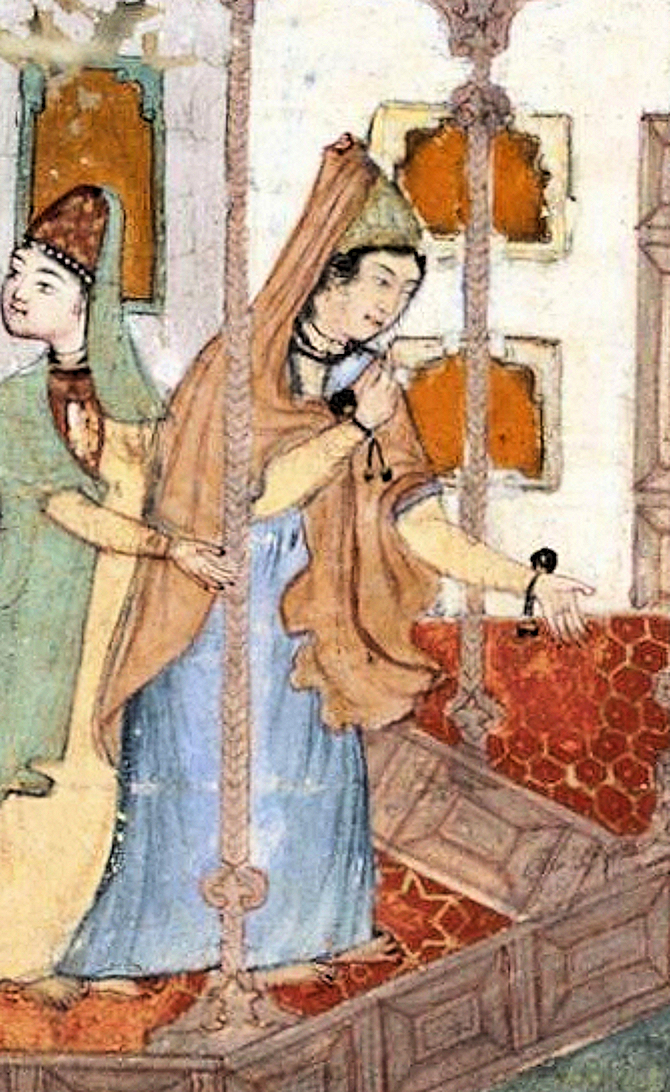
Khub Nigar Khanim, aunt of Babur, wife of Muhammad Husain Mirza Dughlat

== Sources ==
- Balfour, Edward (1885). The Cyclopaedia of India and of Eastern and Southern Asia: Commercial, Industrial, and Scientific. Bernard Quaritch. p. 136.
- Babur, Emperor of Hindustan; Beveridge, Annette Susannah (1922). The Babur-nama in English (Memoirs of Babur). London, Luzac. p. 319.
- Verma, Som Prakash (12 February 2016). The Illustrated Baburnama. Routledge. p. 24. ISBN 978-1-317-33863-5.
- Dale, Stephen F. (3 May 2018). Babur. Cambridge University Press. p. 46. ISBN 978-1-108-47007-0.
- Wade, Bonnie C. (1998). Imaging Sound: An Ethnomusicological Study of Music, Art, and Culture in Mughal India. University of Chicago Press. p. 22. ISBN 978-0-226-86841-7.
- * Dughlat, Mirza Muhammad Haidar (1895). Elias, N. (ed.). The Tarikh-i-Rashidi of Mirza Muhammad Haidar Dughlat: A History of the Moghuls of Central Asia. Translated by Ross, E. Denison.
