= Shah Begum =

- Princess of Badakhshan

Queen consort of Moghulistan
- Tenure: 1461 – 1487
- Born: Badakhshan
- Died: c. 1508; Badakhshan
- Spouse: Yunus Khan
- Issue: Mahmud Khan; Ahmad Alaq; Sultan Nigar Khanum; Daulat Sultan Khanum
Names
- Shah
- House: House of Borjigin (by marriage)
- Father: Sultan Muhammad
- Religion: Islam

Shah Begum (Persian: شاہ بیگم; died 1508) was the Queen consort of Moghulistan as the second wife of Yunus Khan, a descendant of Chaghatai Khan, the second son of Genghis Khan. She was the mother of Mahmud Khan and Ahmad Alaq, the next Moghul Khans of Moghulistan.

== Background and family ==
Shah Begum was the fourth daughter of Shah Sultan Muhammad, king of Badakhshan. Her father's family boasted of their descent from Alexander the Great. She contended that they had swayed the scepter of Badakhshan from three thousand years.

She had five sisters, one of them was married to Sultan Masud Kabuli, who was a descendant of Amir Timur. Another sister of hers, Shahzada Begum was married to Sultan Abu Sa'id Mirza, and bore him Abubakr Mirza. The Mirza, after the death of his father, engaged in war with Sultan Husain Mirza, and caused much disturbance in the kingdom. Her third sister was married to Ibrahim Barlas, who bore him a son, Jihangir Barlas, who at the end of Chaghatai rule became chief minister. Her fourth sister was married to Sayyid Shah Buzurg Arhangi. Her fifth sister was married to Shaikh Abdullah Barlas, who bore him three sons, Sultan Vais Barlas, Mizrab Barlas and Sultan Sanjar.

== Marriage to Yunis Khan ==
When Sultan Yunus Khan returned a second time from Khorasan, Amir Sayyid Ali had died, and Saniz Mirza had sought the assistance of Yunus Khan. Yunus Khan in those days, often went backwards and forwards to Kashghar. At that time, the Khan sent Amir Zia-ud-Din, who was one of the most eminent Sayyids of Kashghar, to Sultan Muhammad, in Badakhshan, to ask one of his most immaculate daughters in marriage. Sayyid Zia-ud-Din brought Shah Begum back with him to Kashghar, and delivered her over to the Khan. Shah Begum married Yunis Khan as his second wife in 1461.

=== Issue ===
Shah Begum bore Yunis Khan four surviving children: two sons and two daughters. The elder son was Sultan Mahmud, known generally in Samarkand as Janikeh Khan. The younger khan was Sultan Ahmad Khan, who was well known by the name of Ilcheh Khan. Her elder daughter was Sultan Nigar Khanum, who married as many as three times. Sultan Nigar Khanum's first husband was Sultan Mahmud Mirza, successively Sultan of Hissar and of Samarkand, and he was the father of her only son, Sultan Ways, known generally as Khan Mirza. Sultan Nigar Khanum married afterwards two khans of the Kaizak Uzbeks in succession. Shah Begum's younger daughter, Daulat Sultan Khanum married Muhammad Temur Sultan, son of Shaibani Khan.

== As queen dowager ==
Shah Begum was widowed in 1487, and survived her husband more than twenty years. Her grandson, Sultan Ways Mirza known as Khan Mirza, son of her daughter Sultan Nigar Khanum had been educated at Tashkent, after his father Sultan Mahmud Mirza's death in 1495, and had become the favourite of his grandmother and aunts, who were at the court of the elder Khan, as well as of his uncle, Muhammad Hussain. Shah Begum, the grandmother, Mihr Nigar Khanum, the aunt, and Muhammad Hussain Mirza, the uncle of Khan Mirza, were all now at Kabul, as well as Khan Mirza himself, who had remained behind with his grandmother, instead of accompanying his cousin Babur on his expedition.

Shah Begum left the Mongol region for family reasons, and after wandering for a long time she met her step grandson Babur in Kabul in 1505. Shah Begum who was the woman of spirit, and of intrigue, resolved to raise her favourite grandson, Khan Mirza to the throne. She gained over a body of the Mughals, who had remained behind at Kabul, and who regarded with reverence the widow of their old Khan, and the mother of the two Khans, his sons. She also drew over to her interest Sultan Sanjar Barlas, a chief of considerable influence, and her sister's son. The real head of the conspiracy, however, seems to have been Muhammad Hussain Mirza, though he was anxious not to appear, and left the ostensible management of the affair to Shah Begum. However, she failed to raise her favourite grandson, Khan Mirza to the throne. She was forgiven by Babur, and he treated her generously.

She had always despotically managed the weak mind of her son, the elder Khan. When the khan retired into the desert, after he was released by Muhammad Shaybani, she found herself, thwarted by his ministers, which produced a quarrel with her son. Unable to bear the contradiction to which she was now subjected, and to which she had never been accustomed, she repaired to Samarkand, under pretense of solicitation from Sheibani some district as a settlement for the khan, and she there appears to have passed her time very comfortably, in the society of her daughters, and of numerous female connections.

In 1507-8, she laid claim to Badakhshan saying that it had been her family's hereditary kingdom for three thousand years. Babur assented to her scheme, and she set out for Badakshan, together with Mihr Nigar Khanum and Mirza Khan.

== Death ==
However, when Mirza Khan came to Badakhshan his first entrance into the country was not prosperous. He had pushed forward to meet with Zobayr of Ragh, a man of no family, and to announce the coming of the begum, when he fell in with a detachment of the army of Mirza Abu Bakr Dughlat, which attacked and dispersed his few followers. He himself fled to Zobayr. Shah Begum, his aunt and, the other ladies who followed behind, were surprised and carried off to Abu Bakr, in whose prisons they died, after much cruel suffering.
