= Dughlats =

Mongol clan

Dughlat

Profile
- Country: Mongol Empire; Chagatai Khanate; Moghulistan; Timurid Empire; Kazakh Khanate; Khanate of Bukhara; Yarkent Khanate; Mughal Empire
- Region: Aksu; Kashgar; Yarkand; Khotan
- Founded: c. 1347 (first mentioned)
- Ancestry: Medieval Mongol Clan
- Founder: Amir Bulaji

Chief
- Amir Bulaji (first chief)
- Amir, Mirza, Beg
- Last Chief: Mirza Muhammad Haidar Dughlat
- Died: c. 1551

The Dughlat clan (Mongolian: Dolood/sevens, Doloo/seven; Middle Mongolian: Doluga, Dolugad; Dulğat; Chinese: 杜格拉特) was a Mongol (later Turko-Mongol) clan that served the Chagatai khans as hereditary vassal rulers of several cities in western Tarim Basin, in modern Xinjiang, from the 14th century until the 16th century. The most famous member of the clan, Mirza Muhammad Haidar, was a military adventurer, historian, and the ruler of Kashmir (1541–1551). His historical work, the Tarikh-i Rashidi, provides much of the information known about the family.

== History ==
=== Early history ===
The Dughlat tribe is mentioned as having supported Genghis Khan during his creation of the Mongol Empire in the early 13th century. Rashid al-Din Hamadani identifies the Dughlad (Dughlat) as a minor tribe of the Mongols. At an early date the entire tribe moved out of Mongolia and eventually settled in the area comprising the ulus of Chagatai Khan.

In the mid-14th century the authority of the Chagatai khans underwent a sudden decline. In the western part of the khanate (specifically Transoxiana and the bordering provinces), the khans had become rulers in name only, with real power in the hands of the local Turko-Mongol amirs after 1346. In the eastern provinces (spec. the Tarim Basin and the area that was to become Moghulistan) the authority of the khans in Transoxiana was virtually nonexistent. As a result, power there was in the hands of the local lords and tribal chiefs.

By this time the Dughlats had become one of the most eminent clans in the eastern regions. Chief among their holdings were the towns Aksu, Kashgar, Yarkand, and Khotan Their influence allowed them to select a Genghisid khan of their own choosing. In 1347, according to the Tarikh-i Rashidi, the Dughlat Amir Bulaji raised a certain Tughlugh Timur to the khanship and recognized his authority. The new khan, despite owing his throne to the Dughlats, was a man of strong character and maintained effective control of Moghulistan. He also converted to Islam, an act that was copied by the Dughlats (one of whom, Amir Tulik, had been secretly converted even before the khan's adoption of the faith). However, the Dughlats continued ruling by the Mongolian law (Yasa), which was not replaced by the Shari'ah untl centuries later.

=== Qamar ud-Din ===
Under Tughlugh Timur, both amirs Tuluk and Bulaji had held the office of ulus beg. After the death of Bulaji the office was given to his son Khudaidad. This was contested by Bulaji's brother, Qamar ud-Din, who desired to be ulus beg himself. His request for the office to be transferred to him was refused by Tughlugh Timur; consequently after the latter's death Qamar ud-Din revolted against Tughlugh Timur's son Ilyas Khoja Khan. He was likely responsible for the death of Ilyas Khoja; most of the family members of Tughlugh Timur were also killed. Qamar ud-Din proclaimed himself khan (the only Dughlat ever to do so) and, although he did not gain the support of many of the amirs, managed to maintain his position in Moghulistan.

Qamar ud-Din's reign consisted of a series of wars with Timur, the amir of Transoxiana. Qamar ud-Din's forces unable to defeat Timur, but at the same time Timur was incapable of decisively defeating the Moghuls, who were able to retreat into the barren steppe country of Moghulistan. During a fresh invasion by Timur and his army in 1390, however, Qamar ud-Din disappeared. His disappearance enabled a Chagatayid, Khizr Khoja, to gain control of Moghulistan.

=== The Dughlats in the 15th century ===
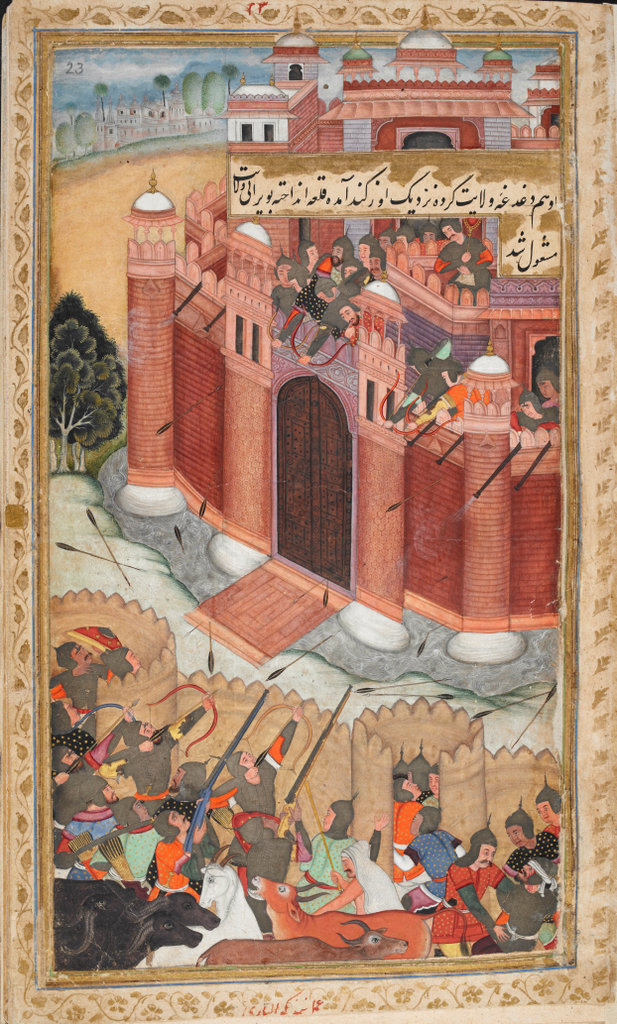
Mirza Abu Bakr Dughlat attempting unsuccessfully to take Uzgend in 1494. Baburnama (1590)

Qamar ud-Din's disappearance had left his nephew Khudaidad the senior member of the Dughlat family. Amir Khudaidad Dughlat had a very good knowledge about Genghis Khan's Yasa(law), which was an example of the Dughlats' continued respect for the Mongolian tradition. According to the Tarikh-i Rashidi, Khudaidad had been an early supporter of Khizr Khoja and had hid him from Qamar ud-Din during the latter's purge of members of the house of Chagatai. Khudaidad's power rapidly increased and he became a king-maker in the years after Khizr Khoja's death. He also divided Aksu, Khotan, and Kashgar and Yarkand amongst his family members; this division of territory lasted until the time of Mirza Aba Bakr.

Khudaidad eventually left the service of the Moghul khans; this did not preclude the other Dughlats from maintaining good relations with them. During the 15th century, Kashgar was recovered after it was temporarily seized by Timur's grandson Ulugh Beg; on the other hand, Aksu was given over to the Moghul khans.

=== Dughlat clan of Kazakhs ===
Now, the Dughlat (Dulat or Дулат in Kazakh language) is one of the major tribe of modern Kazakh people, they belong to Senior-Juz of Kazakhs, mainly inhabited in the east and southern parts of Kazakhstan such as Almaty Oblysy and Jetysu region of Kazakhstan, with a population of approximately 3,000,000 among Kazakhs (see the Dughlat tribe of Kazakh people - from Wikipedia Dughlat introduction in Kazakh language). The Duglats sub-clans are Botpay, Shymyr, Sikymy, Zhanys and Eskeldy (see the brief introduction of Dulats). The most recently Y-DNA tests which investigated by KZ DNA Project in Kazakhstan shows that the Y-DNA haplogroup of Dughlat tribe of Kazakhs carries C3 haplogroups see KZ DNA Project. The international ports of Dulat (Dulata Kouan - 都拉塔口岸 in Chinese) in the Qapqal Xibe Autonomous County of the Ili Kazakh Autonomous Prefecture of China was named after with the Dughlats, because of the historical inhabitant of Dughlats clans in this area in the past, the ports of Dulat was opened in 2003 with the agreement of governments of both Kazakhstan and China.

=== Mirza Aba Bakr ===
Mirza Aba Bakr, the great-great-grandson of Khudaidad, built up an independent kingdom for himself in the last decades of the 15th century. Beginning with the seizure of Yarkand, which was henceforth his capital, he conquered Khotan and Kashgar from other members of his family and defied numerous attempts by the Moghul khans to force him into submission. By the beginning of the 16th century he was also conducting raids into Ferghana, Badakshan and Ladakh. Near the end of his reign he even managed to plunder Aksu, which was still held by the Moghuls. In 1514 his forces were defeated by the Moghul Sultan Said Khan, compelling him to flee. This marked the end of Dughlat control over the western Tarim Basin cities, which were in the hands of the Moghul khans until they were conquered by the Dzungars in the late 17th century.

=== Mirza Muhammad Haidar ===
Mirza Muhammad Haidar was the nephew of Mirza Aba Bakr. He was the son of Muhammad Husain Kurkan, who had married into the family of the Moghul khans and had spent his life alternating between serving the Moghuls, the Timurid Babur and the Shaybanid Uzbeks. Mirza Haidar himself entered the service of Sultan Said Khan just before the latter's conquest of Mirza Aba Bakr's kingdom. During the khan's lifetime he conducted a holy war in Ladakh on his behalf. After Sultan Said Khan's death in 1533 his son Abdur Rashid Khan executed Mirza Haidar's uncle; fearing the same fate, Mirza Haidar fled to the Mughal Emperor Humayun in northern India. It was in the service of the emperor that he undertook the conquest of Kashmir in 1541. Mirza Haidar was more or less able to retain his position as ruler of Kashmir for ten years, during which he wrote the Tarikh-i Rashidi. His reign in Kashmir ended in 1551 when he was killed by the Kashmiris while fighting against a revolt. Mirza Haider Dughlat in the Tarikh-i Rashidi constantly alludes to a distinct tribe or community of Moghuls in Mughalistan, however reduced in numbers, who had preserved Mongol customs, and from the incidental references to Mongolian phrases and terms, likely retained elements of the original Mongolian language, despite the growth of Islam and the growing use of the Turki language, the latter which Haider naturally spoke. According to the Tarikh-i Rashidi, Haider Dughlat considered his "Moghul Ulus" to be a separate people from the settled Turks of Transoxiania, from the fifteenth century and the first half of the sixteenth century.
