= Abdul Karim Khan (Yarkand) =

Khan of the Yarkand Khanate from 1560 to 1591

Khan of Yarkent Khanate (1514–1705)
- Reign: 1560–1591
- Predecessor: Abdurashid Khan
- Successor: Muhammad Sultan
- Born: 1529
- Died: 1591 (aged 61–62)
- House: Borjigin
- Father: Abdurashid Khan

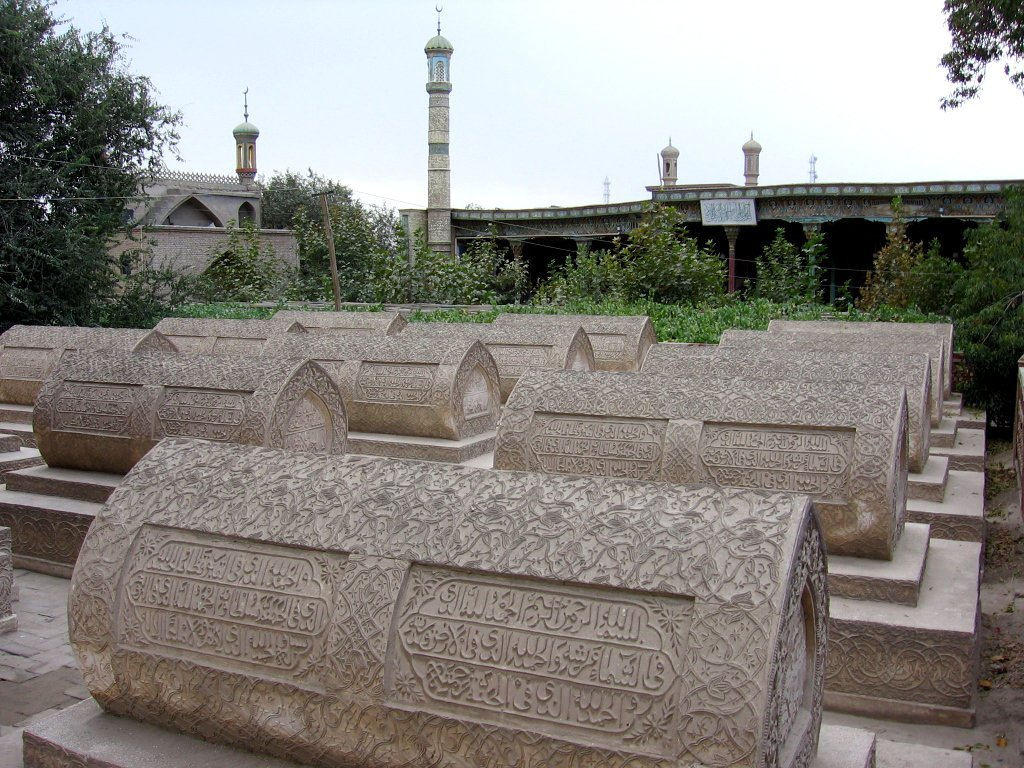
Royal cemetery Altyn with tombs of Moghul Khans of Yarkand Khanate (1465–1759), including Abdul Karim Khan, his father Abdurashid Khan and grandfather Sultan Said Khan in Yarkand, Xinjiang-Uyghur Autonomous Region of People's Republic of China, 2005

Abdul Karim Khan (Chagatai and Persian: عبد الکریم خان) was the ruler of Yarkent Khanate in what is now north-west China (Xinjiang) between 1560 and 1591. He was second son of Abdurashid Khan. During his reign, he lost control over a number of oases and merely acted as the titular figurehead ruler.

Abdul Karim Khan was a descendant of the first Moghul Khan Tughlugh Timur (1347–1363). He came to power in 1560. He became the Khan as the eldest son in the family after the death of his father Abdurashid Khan.

Abdul Karim Khan distributed between his brothers all the troops and gold that he inherited from his father and increased troop numbers following the failed attempt by the Barlas emirs to replace him with his brother Sufi Sultan, who ruled in Kashgar. He expelled the hakim of Yarkand, Mahmud Barlas, and the emir of Khotan, Ahmad Barlas, and dispersed their 3,000 troops. He sent his brother Abduraim Sultan to rule Chalish and Turpan, where the position of "Little Khan" (contrary to the "Great Khan" who ruled from Yarkand) was vacant after the death of Shah Khan, son of Mansur Khan, in 1570 in a battle with the Kalmaks.

Abdul Karim Khan's reign was generally tranquil thanks to the absence of wars and famine. Contemporary Balkh historian Mahmud ibn Vali wrote in 1644 in his work " Bahr al-asrar " that: Peace and tranquillity and public security of the people of Uyghurstan was so widespread during the rule of Abdul Karim Khan that it caused envy among neighbouring countries.

During Abdul Karim Khan's reign, Khoja Iskhak Wali, 4th son of Nakshbandi sheikh Mahdum-i- Azam and founder of Sufi Order, Iskhakiyya, disciples of which were later known as Karataghliks or Black Mountaineers, came to Yarkand at the Khan's invitation. He was unable to attract Abdul Karim Khan to his sect, but was allowed to carry out his missionary work among the population of the Yarkand Khanate during which time 40,000 became his disciples with 164 becoming teachers of his sect. Khoja Iskhak Wali managed to attract to his sect a younger brother of Abdul Karim Khan, Muhammad Sultan, who became Khan in 1591. Khoja Iskhak Wali died in 1599 at the age of 94. His son Khoja Yahia (died in 1646) succeeded him in Yarkand as a head of Khojagan Iskhakiya Sufi Order , that became by this time a powerful separate branch of Nakshbandi Sufi Order with disciples in Yarkand, Khotan, Aksu, Kucha, Chalish up to Turpan.

Abdul Karim Khan died in 1591 and was succeeded by his brother Muhammad Sultan.

== Chaghatai Khanate ==
Preceded by Abdurashid Khan	Yarkand Khanate Khan; 1560–1591	Succeeded by Muhammad Sultan

== Sources ==
- James A. Millward (1998). Beyond the pass: economy, ethnicity, and empire in Qing Central Asia, 1759–1864. Stanford University Press. p. 298. ISBN 0-8047-2933-6. Retrieved 2010-11-28.
- Laura Newby (2005). The Empire and the Khanate: a political history of Qing relations with Khoqand c. 1760–1860. BRILL. p. 97. ISBN 90-04-14550-8. Retrieved 2010-11-28.
- Shah Mahmud Churas Chronicles (written in 1670 in Yarkand) Translation and research by Akimushkin O.F. Publishing house of Eastern literature " Nauka", Moscow, 1976
- Kutlukov M (1990). About foundation of Yarkand Khanate (1465–1759). Almata. "Pan" publish house.
