= Sultan Nigar Khanum =

- consort of Samarkand
- Tenure: 1494 – 1495
- Born: Moghulistan
- Died: c. 1528; Moghulistan
- Spouse: Sultan Mahmud Mirza; Awiq Sultan; Qasim Khan
- Issue: Sultan Uways Khan Mirza; Two daughters
Names
- Sultan Nigar
- House: House of Borjigin (by birth)
- Father: Yunus Khan
- Mother: Shah Begum
- Religion: Islam

Sultan Nigar Khanum (died 1528) was the consort of Samarkand as the fourth wife of Sultan Mahmud Mirza, the King of Ferghana Valley. She was born a princess of the Chagatai Khanate as a daughter of Yunus Khan, the Great Khan of Moghulistan and his second wife Shah Begum.

== Family ==
Sultan Nigar Khanum was born a princess of the Chagatai Khanate as the second daughter of Yunus Khan, the Great Khan of Moghulistan and his second wife Shah Begum. Her paternal grandfather was Uwais Khan, the Moghul Khan of Mughalistan and her father's predecessor.

Sultan Nigar was a direct descendant of Genghis Khan, the founder and Great Khan (Emperor) of the Mongol Empire through her father's side. Being the daughter of a Khan, she held the title of "Khanum" ("daughter of a Khan or princess") by birth. She was also the half-aunt of Emperor Babur, the founder of the Mughal Empire of India as well as its first Emperor.

== Marriages ==
=== Mahmud Mirza ===
She married firstly to Sultan Mahmud Mirza. With him she had a son, Sultan Wais also known as Khan Mirza. She was widowed in January, 1495. On Mahmud's death in Samarkand she joined her brothers in Tashkent, going off "without giving any notice of her intentions," says Babar.

=== Awiq Sultan ===
Later on she, married Awiq Sultan Juji, the chief of the Uzbek Qazaqs. Haidar Mirza throws some light, and it seems that when Shaybani had murdered her brother, Mahmud Khan, Awiq left him and joined the Uzbek Qazaqs, his own people, and Sultan Nigar followed him into Moghalistan.

She had two daughters by Awiq, one of whom married Abdullah Quchin and died a young wife, and the other married Rashid Sultan Chaghatai.

=== Qasim Khan ===
On Awiq's death, Sultan Nigar was married to his brother Qasim, presumably in consonance with the Turkish custom of yanglik.

With Qasim's death, the khanship of the Qazaqs devolved on Sultan Nigar's stepson named Tahir. He was, says Haidar, "very much attached to her, and even preferred her to the mother who had given him birth."

Sultan Nigar showed her appreciation of Tahir's affection, but petitioned him, saying: "Although you are (as) my child, and I neither think of nor desire any son but you, yet I wish you to take me to my nephew, Sultan Sa'id Khan. For I am grown old, and I have no longer the strength to bear this wandering life in the deserts of Uzbekistan. Take me where I may enjoy some quiet and repose." She then offered to mediate for him and to obtain the support for him of the Mughal Khagans against his foes. Tahir accordingly escorted her to the Moghulistan borders, and with her waited upon Sa'id. "The latter, from love of his aunt, rose, saying that although his rising to receive Tahir was contrary to the rules of Genghis (their common ancestor), yet that he did it out of gratitude because Tahir had brought his aunt."

== Death ==
Sultan Nigar Khanum died of a hemorrhage in the summer of 1528.
