= Mirza Muhammad Haidar Dughlat =

Chagatai Turco-Mongol military general (died 1551)

Mirza Muhammad Haider Dughlat
- Dughlat Prince; Mirza; Beg
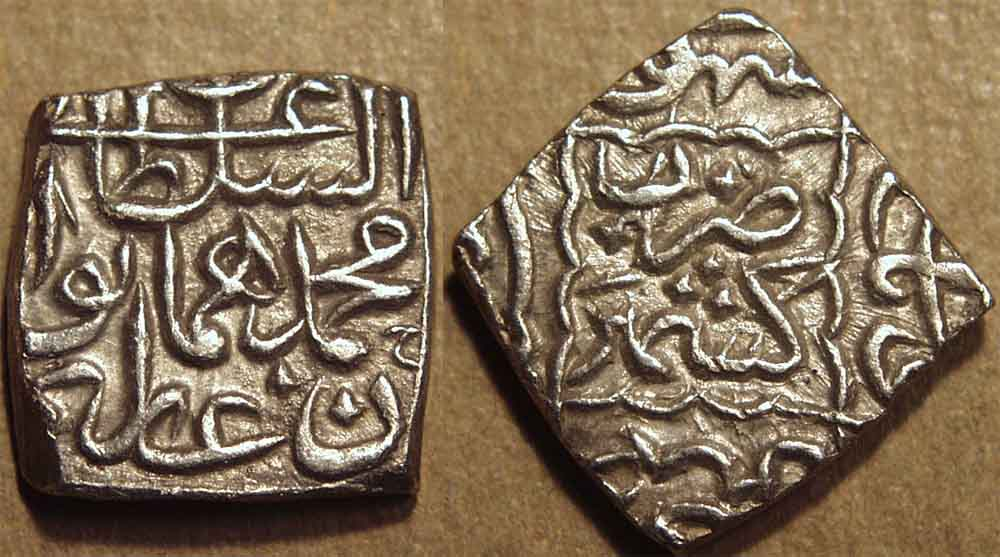
- Silver sasnu issued during 1546–50 in Kashmir by Haidar Dughlat, in the name of the Mughal emperor Humayun. The obverse legend reads al-sultan al-a'zam Muhammad humayun ghazi. The reverse reads dharb-i kashmir

Subahdar of Kashmir
- Reign: c. 1540 – 1551
- Predecessor: Position established
- Successor: Position abolished
- Sultan: Ismail Shah; Nazuk Shah
- Born: c. 1499/1500; Tashkent, Moghulistan
- Died: c. 1551 (aged 50–52); Srinagar, Maraj, Kashmir Sultanate (Srinagar, Jammu and Kashmir, India)
- Burial: Mazar-i-Salatin, Zaina Kadal, Srinagar
Names
- Mirza Muhammad Haider Dughlat Ibn Muhammad Hussain Mirza Kurkan (Persian: میرزا محمد حیدر دغلت بن محمد حسین میرزا کرکان)
- House: Chagatai
- Dynasty: Dughlat (through paternal lineage); Borjigin (through maternal lineage)
- Father: Muhammad Husain Mirza Dughlat
- Mother: Khub Nigar Khanim
- Religion: Sunni Islam
- Occupation: Military General; Politician
- Military career
- Allegiance: (Chagatai Khanate) Yarkent Khanate (Borjigin dynasty) in (1530s); Mughal Empire (Mughal dynasty) (1540–1551)
- Branch: Chagatai Army; Mughal Army
- Rank: General
- Conflicts: Campaign on Kashmir (1533); Invasion of Tibet (after 1533); Battle of Kannauj (1540); Campaign on Kashmir (1540)

Mirza Muhammad Haidar Dughlat Beg (Persian: میرزا محمد حیدر دوغلات بیگ; c. 1499/1500 – 1551) was a Chagatai Turco-Mongol military general, governor of Kashmir, and a historian. He was a Mughal Dughlat prince who wrote in both Chaghatai and Persian languages. Haidar and Babur were first-degree cousins on their mother's side (they had the same grandfather Yunus Khan), both belonging to the line of Genghis Khan. Unlike Babur, Haidar considered himself more of an ethnic Mongol of Moghulistan.

Following his death in 1551, Dughlat was buried in Mazar-i-Salatin, Zaina Kadal, Srinagar.

== Background ==
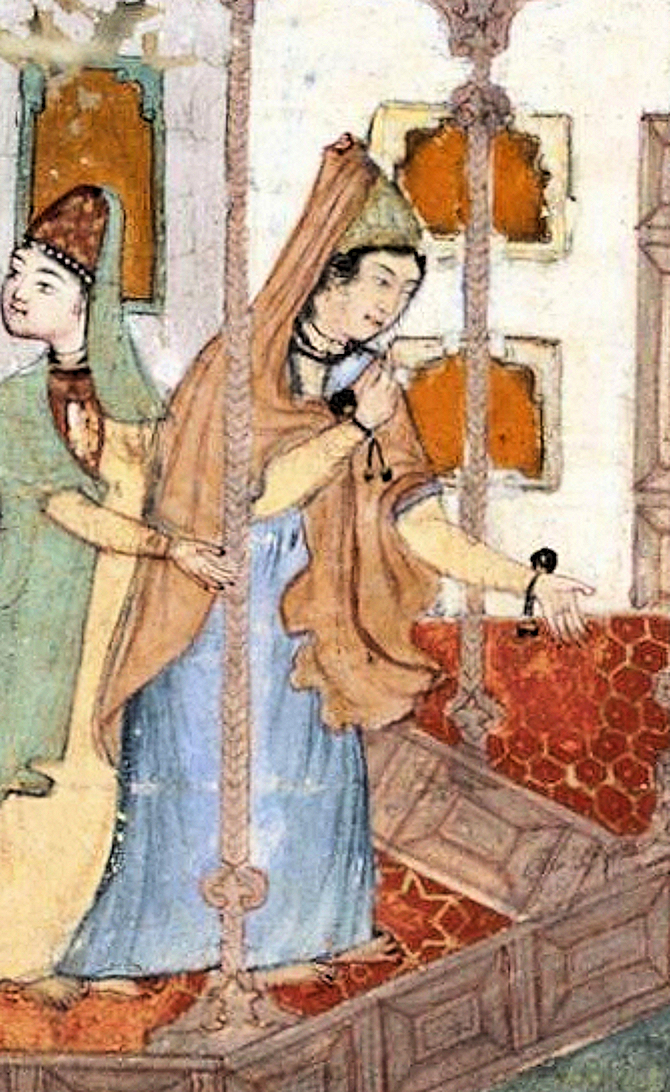
Khub Nigar Khanim (b. 1463), daughter of Yunus Khan, and mother of Mirza Muhammad Haidar Dughlat

Mirza Haidar Dughlat Beg in the Tarikh-i Rashidi constantly alludes to a distinct tribe or community of Moghuls in Mughalistan, however reduced in numbers, who had preserved Mongol customs, and from the incidental references to Mongolian phrases and terms, likely retained elements of the original Mongolian language, despite the growth of Islam and the growing use of the Turki language, the latter which Haider naturally spoke. According to the Tarikh-i Rashidi, Haider Dughlat considered his "Moghul Ulus" to be a separate people from the settled Turks of Transoxiania, from the fifteenth century and the first half of the sixteenth century. According to Vasily Bartold, there are “some indications that the language of the Moghuls was Mongolian until the 16th century". For the sedentary Mongols in Transoxiana, the nomadic Mongols to their east in Xinjiang and Kashgar represented a bastion of true Mongol culture, hence the name "Moghulistan".

== Campaigns ==
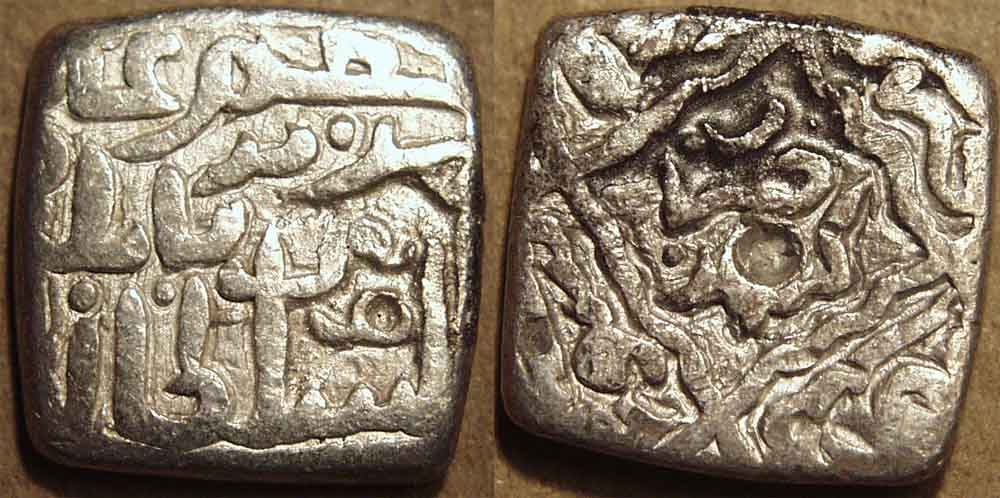
Silver sasnu issued in 1533 in Kashmir by Haidar Dughlat, in the name of Said Khan. The obverse legend reads al-sultan al-a'zam mir sa'id khan.

However, Haider did not stay long in Kashmir, leaving after making a treaty with the local sultan and striking coins in the name of Said Khan. He had also attacked Tibet through Ladakh but failed to conquer Lhasa.

He returned in 1540, fighting for the Mughal Emperor Humayun. Arriving in Kashmir, Haidar installed as sultan the head of the Sayyid faction, Nazuk. In 1546, after Humayun recovered Kabul, Haidar removed Nazuk Shah and struck coins in the name of the Mughal emperor.

His mother was Khub Nigar Khanum, third daughter of Yunus Khan by Isan Daulat Begum, and a younger sister of Qutlugh Nigar Khanum, mother of Babur. Mirza Muhammad Haidar Dughlat Beg governed Kashmir from 1540 to 1551, when he was killed in battle.

== Notes ==
- Mansura Haidar (translator) (2002), Mirza Haidar Dughlat as Depicted in Persian Sources.
