= Chughtai =

Family name originating in the Chagatai Khanate

Chughtai or Chagatai (Urdu: چغتائی, romanized: Cuġtā'ī) is a surname in Central Asia and South Asia, originating in the Chagatai Khanate as taken up by the descendants and successors of Chagatai Khan who was the second son of Genghis Khan. Accordingly, some of the other descendants also use variants such as Mirza, Baig and Khan.

== Etymology of Chughtai ==
The surname “Chughtai” originates from the Mongolian word “Chaghadai”, a derivative of “Chagan” meaning “white”. The suffix “-dai” is added to form “Chaghadai”. Over time, “Chaghadai” evolved into “Chughtai”, meaning, “he who is white”.

== People with the surname ==
- Abdur Rahman Chughtai (1897-1975), Pakistani painter.
- Ismat Chughtai (1915–1991), Indian writer
- Ikram Chughtai (1941–2023), Pakistani researcher
- Dr Inam ul haq Chughtai (1968), Pakistani Doctor
- Mohammad Shafiq Chughtai (1948–2011), Saudi Music Composer
- Tehzeeb Ul Hassan (2003-Present), Pakistani Legal Researcher

== See also ==
- 11417 Chughtai
- Chagatai Khanate
- Chagatai language
