= Tamerlane: Rise of the Last Conqueror =

2026 historical action film

- Directed by: Jacob Schwarz
- Written by: Matthew Greene
- Starring: Christian Mortensen; Mahesh Jadu; Yulduz Rajabova; Joshua Jo
- Production company: Mystery Box
- Distributed by: Well Go USA Entertainment (North America)
- Release date: April 14, 2026 (United States)
- Running time: 119 minutes
- Language: English

Tamerlane: Rise of the Last Conqueror is a 2026 historical action film directed by Jacob Schwarz and written by Matthew Greene. Starring Christian Mortensen, Mahesh Jadu, Yulduz Rajabova, and Joshua Jo, it depicts the rise of Timur in 14th-century Central Asia. The film was sold internationally under the title Tamerlane: Rise of the Last Conqueror and released in North America by Well Go USA Entertainment as Rise of the Conqueror.

== Plot ==
In 14th-century Central Asia, Amir Qazaghan, ruler of the Chagatai Khanate, is murdered, and a dagger belonging to the Barlas clan is left at the scene to implicate them. Hadji (Hajji Beg Barlas), the Barlas leader, denies responsibility and leads a rebellion against the Mongol overlords, but is killed, still protesting his innocence. His nephew, Timur, chooses not to join the revolt and instead pledges loyalty to the Mongol ruler Tugluk Khan, while Qazaghan's grandson and heir, Hussayn (Amir Husayn), goes into hiding.

Timur leads a warband, the Baghatur, protecting Silk Road caravans from raiders led by the bandit leader Banu and her men, including the Scottish mercenary James. Tugluk Khan's son, Ilias (Ilyas Khoja), summons Timur to Samarkand, where he marries Aljai, Hussayn's sister, and the couple soon expect a child. Tugluk Khan then names Timur chief advisor to Ilias, delaying his return to Hussayn's circle. At a public banquet, Ilias needles Timur about his family's rebellious past, forcing him to publicly renew his loyalty to the Khan.

Wary of Timur's growing influence, Ilias has him poisoned with "mad honey" and left for dead, while Aljai is gravely wounded defending their infant son, Jahongir. Timur is found and nursed back to health over several months by Banu's band of exiles, among them Kay Khusrau, a kinsman believed dead since Hadji's uprising. Kay Khusrau urges Timur to embrace a prophecy, made by his late father, that he is destined to become a great ruler, but Timur resists, focused only on avenging his wife. Aljai eventually dies of her wounds, urging Timur with her final words to protect their son and restore order.

Timur learns that Hussayn also survived Ilias's purge and has spent months secretly building an army with the help of his wife, Sarai (Saray Mulk Khanum). The two men reunite, and Timur is reassured that Jahongir has been kept safe. When Tugluk Khan dies, Ilias departs Samarkand to secure his succession as Khan. Timur and Hussayn seize the opportunity: with smuggled Chinese black powder supplied by the merchant Jasur, they stage a bloodless coup, tricking the city's garrison commander, Bikijuk, into a false surrender and ambushing his retreating forces, delivering Samarkand to Hussayn without harming its people.

Once in power, Hussayn wants to execute the nobles who had conspired against Qazaghan, while Timur argues for mercy, straining their alliance. Timur also grows suspicious that Hussayn orchestrated their grandfather's murder himself, framing the Barlas clan to clear his path to the throne; when confronted, Hussayn admits it, further fracturing their bond.

Ilias marches south to retake the city, and Timur and Hussayn prepare a defense using Jasur's gunpowder. During the battle, Timur's men become trapped, but Hussayn abandons them to instead defend Samarkand directly, leaving Timur badly wounded and lamed. Now aided by Banu, Kay Khusrau, James, and Jasur, Timur resolves to finish what he started. Posing as an emissary offering Hussayn's surrender, he infiltrates Ilias's camp alone, springs a trap that opens the gates for his allies, and kills Ilias in single combat, ending the Mongol prince's rule. Acclaimed by his men, Timur pledges to lead with strength and justice, sparing those who submit to him and punishing those who resist, setting the stage for his rise as history's Tamerlane.

== Cast ==
- Christian Mortensen as Timur, a Barlas commander loyal to Amir Qazaghan of the Chagatai Khanate
- Mahesh Jadu as Hussayn, grandson and heir of Qazaghan
- Yulduz Rajabova as Aljai, Timur's wife, Hussayn's sister, granddaughter of Qazaghan
- Joshua Jo as Ilias, son and heir of Tugluk Khan of the Moghul Khanate
- Dulguun Odkhuu as Sarai, wife of Hussayn
- Sanjar Madi as Jasur, a Silk Road merchant and ally of Timur
- Arazou as Banu, a Persian bandit leader on the Silk Road
- Paul Marlon as James, a Scottish mercenary fighter in Banu's band
- Umit Ulgen as Baraka, Timur's mentor
- Aziz Beyshenaliev as Abu Shihab, a Moghul governor in Samarkand
- Yerkebulan Daiyrov as Bikijuk, a Moghul commander
- Zhandos Aibassov as Iskander, a Chagatai commander
- Maqsat Sabitov as Elchi, a soldier loyal to Timur
- Maruf Otajonov as Tugluk Khan, ruler of the Moghul Khanate
- Assan Mazhit as Hadji, Timur's uncle and the Barlas leader under Chagatai rule

== Production ==
In May 2025, Screen Daily reported that Capture had launched international sales on the film under the title Tamerlane: Rise of the Last Conqueror. In January 2026, Yahoo Entertainment reported that Well Go USA had acquired North American rights and that the film had been produced by Mystery Box. According to Well Go USA's official synopsis, the film was shot in Uzbekistan and Kazakhstan.

== Release ==
For its North American release, Well Go USA marketed the film under the shorter title Rise of the Conqueror and released it digitally in the United States on April 14, 2026. On March 12, 2026, ScreenAnarchy debuted the film's trailer and reported that Blu-ray and DVD editions would follow on June 30, 2026.
