= Battle of Tashkent (1365) =

1365 battle between the Chagatai Khanate and Timur

Date	1365
Location	Tashkent (today Uzbekistan)
Result	Moghul victory
Territorial changes	Moghul offensive to Samarqand

Belligerents
Moghulistan	Forces of Amir Husayn and Timur

Commanders and leaders
Shams ad-Din Beg; Ilyas Khwaja	Amir Husayn; Timur (WIA)

Casualties and losses
Unknown	10,000

The Battle of Tashkent also known as the Battle of the Mire or The Battle of the Marshes took place between the Chagatai Khanate and the forces of Amir Husayn and Timur, and a rare defeat for Timur.

In 1365, the Mongols returned under the leadership of Haji Ilyas. Timur and Amir Hussein set out for Tashkent to meet this army. The battle ended inconclusively on the first day. On the second day, although Timur initially repelled the Mongols, Mongol General Shams ad-Din Beg gathered a Mongol unit and defeated Timur without him realizing what had happened, suffering heavy losses. Amir Hussein's condition was not good. He was defeated and retreated. Realizing that Timur was also defeated, he realized that he had lost the battle and fled towards Samarkand. The Mongols came and besieged Samarkand, Timur's capital, neither Amir Hussein nor Timur faced the Mongols. Samarkand was left to its fate, and by their own efforts they defeated the Mongols.

== Sources ==
- Roux, Jean-Paul (1991). Tamerlan (in French). Fayard. ISBN 978-2-213-02742-5.
- Grousset, René (1970). The Empire of the Steppes: A History of Central Asia. Rutgers University Press. ISBN 978-0-8135-1304-1.
