= Timurid conquests and invasions =

Wars and campaigns of the Timurids

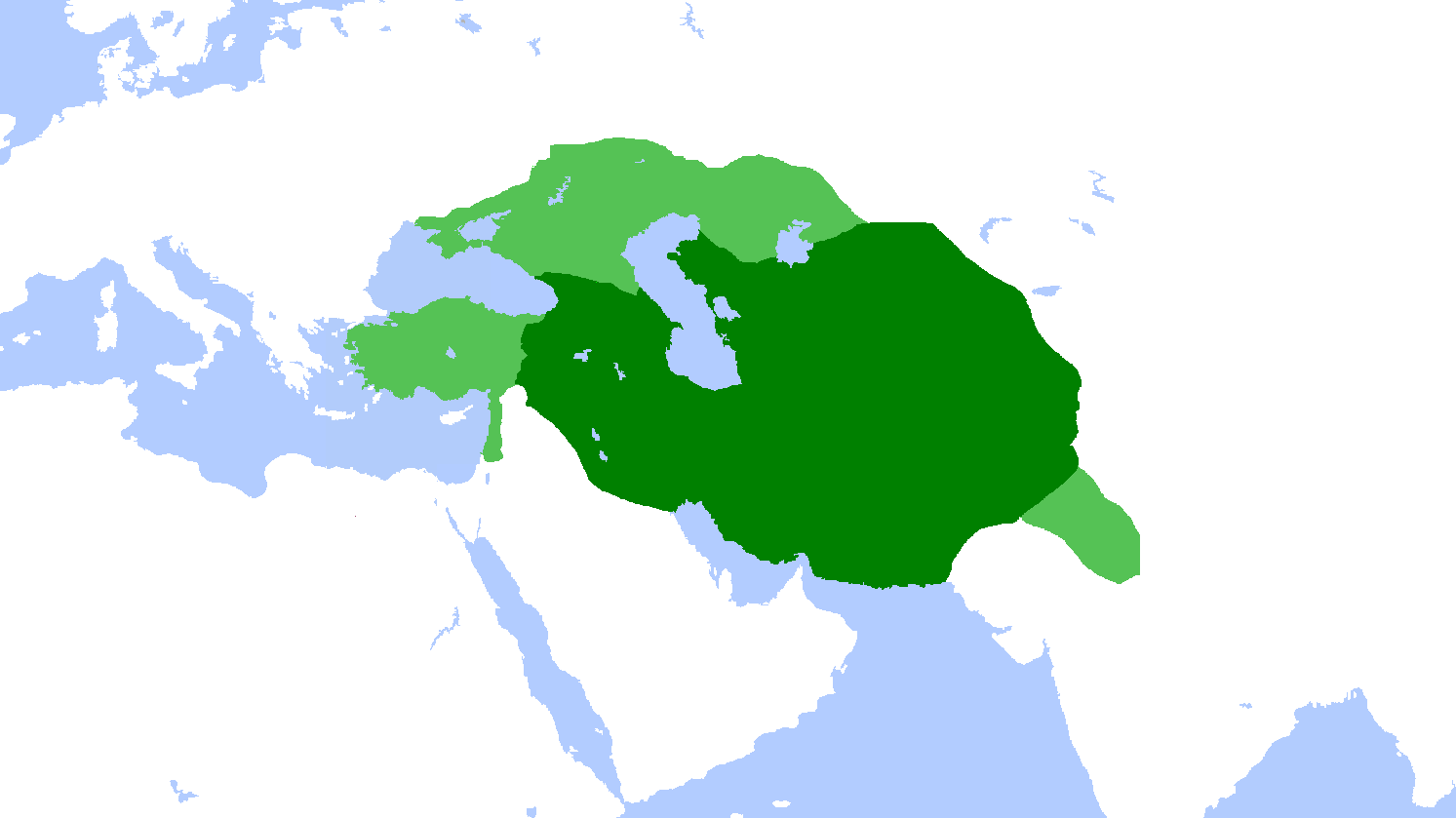
- Timurid Empire at its greatest extent (without vassals) – dark green is territories and light green is areas subjugated to Timur's raids.
Date	1369–1405 (36 years)
Location	Eurasia

Casualties and losses
- 7–17 million deaths

The Timurid conquests and invasions started in the late 14th century with Timur's control over the Chagatai Khanate and ended at the start of the 15th century with the death of Timur. Due to the sheer scale of Timur's wars, and due to the fact that he was generally undefeated in battle, he has been regarded as one of the most successful military commanders of all time. These wars resulted in Timur's supremacy over Central Asia, Persia, the Caucasus, the Levant, and parts of South Asia and Eastern Europe, and they also resulted in the formation of the short-lived Timurid Empire.

In 1370, Timur gained control of Transoxiana, over the western portion of the Chagatai Khanate after defeating Amir Husayn at the Battle of Balkh. However, the laws laid down by Genghis Khan prevented him from becoming Khagan in his own right because he was not a direct descendant of Genghis by birth. Instead, he installed a puppet Khan descended from Ögedei, Suurgatmish. After that, he launched massive military campaigns in all directions and established his suzerainty over most of the Middle East and Central Asia. He never adopted the title of Emperor or Caliph, maintaining the title of Amir.

To legitimize his rule and his military campaigns, Timur married Husayn's widow Saray Mulk Khanum, a princess who was a descendant of Genghis Khan. In this way, he called himself Temur Gurgan (son-in-law of Genghis Khan, the Great Khan). Timurid territorial gains in Transoxiana and Central Asia as well as Timur's suzerainty over the Mamluk Sultanate, the Ottoman Empire, the Delhi Sultanate and the Golden Horde were weakened after his death, due to a war of succession between his son and grandson Shahrukh Mirza and Khalil Sultan. However, in South Asia, a Timurid state survived until the mid 19th century in the form of the Mughal Empire which was founded by his great-great-grandson Babur.

== Central Asia ==
Timur became head of the Mongol Barlas tribe (a Central Asian tribe) and its vast lands by helping Amir Husayn, a Qara'unas prince and de facto ruler of Western Chagatai Khanate. Timur's period as a Moghul vassal came to an end when Tughlugh Timur appointed his son Ilyas Khoja as governor of Mawarannahr. Both Timur and Amir Husayn rebelled against Ilyas Khoja but were defeated by Khoja's army at Tashkent. Ilyas Khoja advanced towards Samarkand but here he was defeated by Timurid forces and forced to retreat back into Eastern Chagatai Khanate. In this way, Timur became ruler of Samarkand.

== South Asia ==
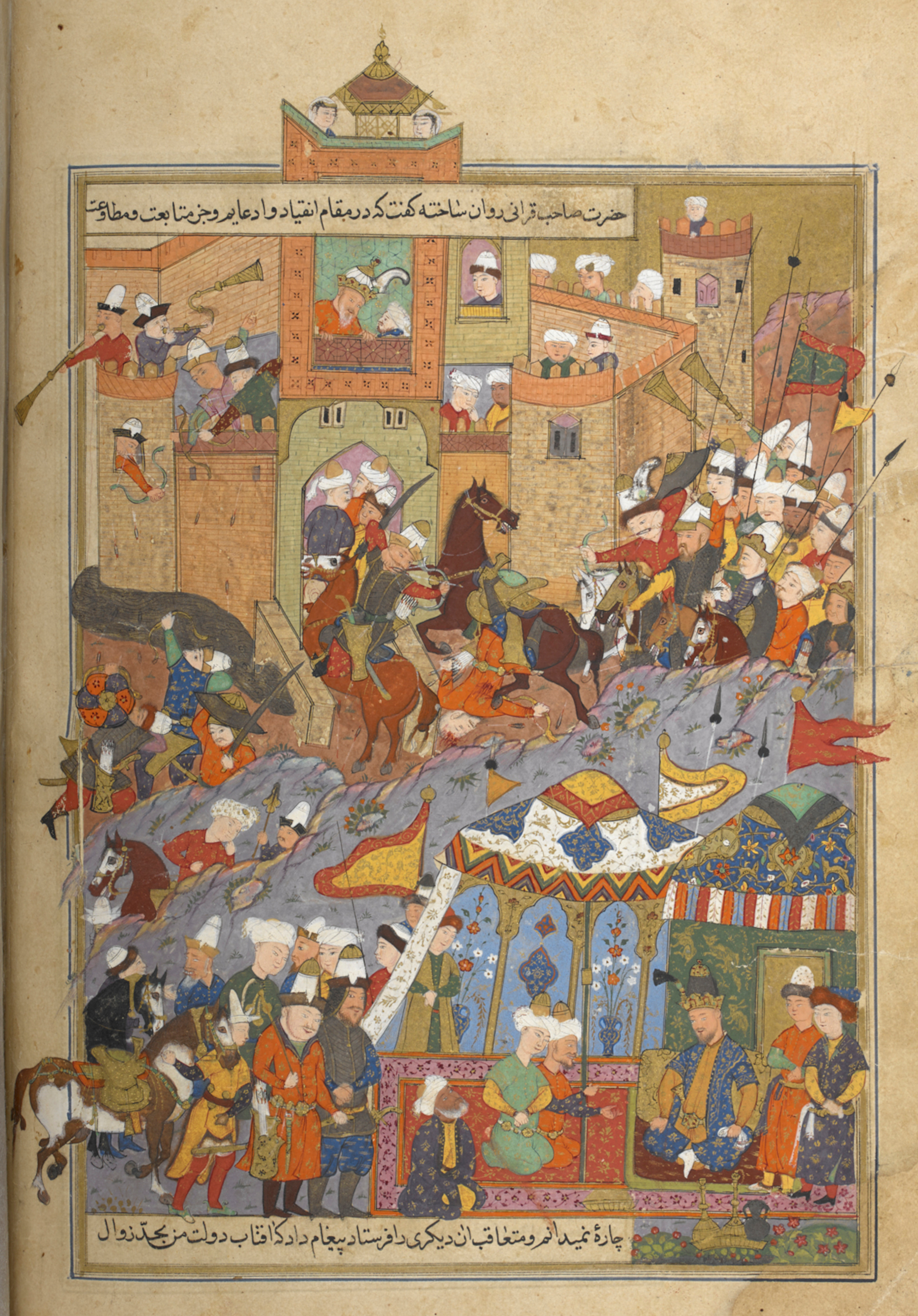
Timur the Great commanding the Siege of Balkh

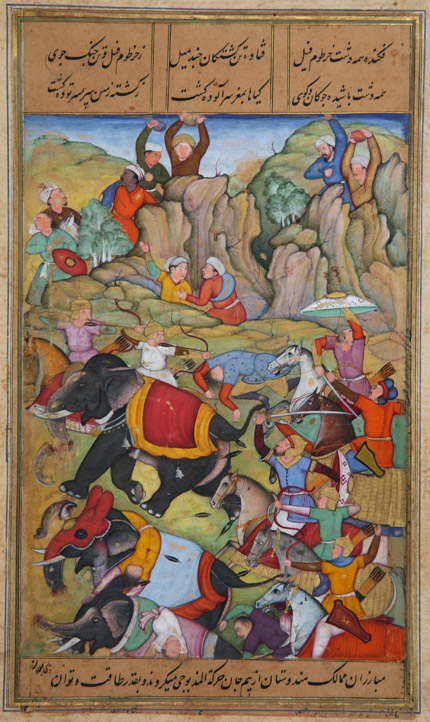
Timur defeats the Sultan of Delhi, Nasir-ud-Din Mahmud Shah Tughluq in the winter of 1397–1398, painting dated 1595–1600

My principal object in coming to Hindustan…has been to accomplish two things. The first was to war with the infidels, the enemies of the Mohammadan religion; and by this religious warfare to acquire some claim to reward in the life to come. The other was…that the army of Islam might gain something by plundering the wealth and valuables of the infidels: plunder in war is as lawful as their mothers’ milk to Musalmans who war for their faith, and the consuming of that which is lawful is a means of grace.”

— Timur

In 1370 Timur decided to attack Amir Husayn at Balkh. After crossing the Amu Darya at Termez his army surrounded the city. Husayn's army came out of the city to attack Timur's men, perhaps suggesting that they were unhappy to find themselves being besieged. The same occurred on the second day of the battle, but this time Timur's men managed to get into the city. Husayn shut himself up inside the citadel, leaving Timur's men to sack the city.

After capturing the city, Timur executed Khabul Shah, the Husayn's puppet Khan of Western Chagatai and installed Suurgatmish on the throne of Khan as his puppet. This made Timur the main power in Mawarannahr and Western Chagatai Khanate with supremacy over Central Asia.

Balochistan centres around Kandahar and it was in this area in 1398 that Pir Muhammad, the grandson of Timur, fought the Afghans in the Sulaiman mountains. According to local tradition Timur himself passed through Marri country during one of his Indian expeditions.

In 1398, Timur started his campaign towards Hindustan. At that time, the dominant power of Indian subcontinent was the Tughlaq dynasty of the Delhi Sultanate, but it had already been weakened by the formation of regional sultanates and struggle of succession within imperial family. Timur started his journey from Samarkand. He invaded the northern Indian subcontinent by crossing the Indus River on September 30, 1398.

Timurid forces firstly sacked Tulamba and then Multan by October 1398. Prior to Timur's invasion on Delhi, his grandson Pir Muhammad had already started his expedition. He had captured Uch. Pir Muhammad then joined Timur. The governor of the Bhatner fort was defeated, and Timur destroyed the fort and the city in the Siege of Bhatner also known as Sack of Bhatner Fort (1398). He also faced resistance by Khap militias in Meerut but he was still able to approach Delhi, arrived in 1398. In this way, he already defeated all-important administrative centres of Delhi Sultanate before his arrival to Delhi.

The battle between Sultan Nasir-ud-Din Tughlaq allied with Mallu Iqbal and Timur took place on 17 December 1398. Indian forces had war elephants armored with chain mail and poison on their tusks which gave difficult time to Timurid forces as Timurids experienced this first time. But within a passage of time Timur had understood that elephants were easily panicked. He capitalized on the subsequent disruption in the forces of Nasir-ud-Din Tughluq, securing an easy victory. Sultan of Delhi fled with remnants of his forces. Delhi was sacked and left in ruins. After the battle, Timur installed Khizr Khan, the Governor of Multan as the new Sultan of Delhi Sultanate under his suzerainty.

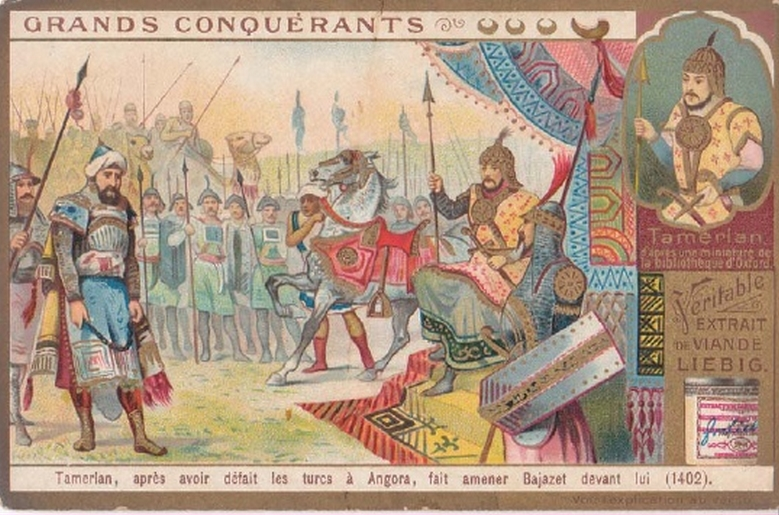
Bayezid I at the hands of Timur. After defeating Bayezid at Ankara, Timur became the preeminent ruler in the Muslim world and Eurasia.

Delhi's conquest was one of the greatest victories of Timur, arguably surpassing Cyrus the Great, Darius the Great, Alexander the Great and Genghis Khan because of the harsh conditions of the journey and the achievement of taking down the richest city of the world at the time. Delhi suffered a great loss due to this and took a century to recover.

== Western Asia ==
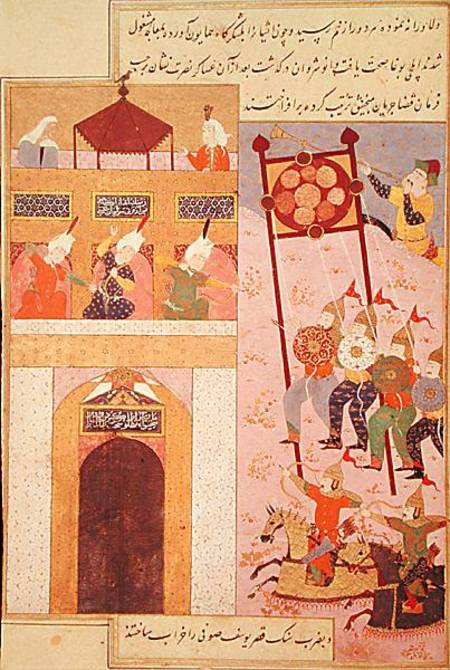
Timur besieges the historic city of Urganj.

Tamerlane launched a series of campaigns in Western Asia to assert dominance in the first decade of the 15th century. He reestablished his authority over Georgia and recaptured Baghdad from the Jalayirid Sultan Ahmad Jalayir, who had seized it in his absence. He also launched another campaign through Kurdistan, battling the Qara Qoyunlu Turkmens. Later, he attacked Syria, capturing Aleppo and Homs without resistance but looted and brutally massacred Damascus. Despite objections from his commanders, he pressed on to Anatolia, where he clashed with the Ottomans in 1402. At the Battle of Ankara, he decisively defeated Sultan Bayezid I, capturing him and destabilizing Ottoman rule. After looting major Ottoman cities, he withdrew without establishing a permanent administration. His return to Samarkand in 1404 was marked by suppressing a rebellion in Mazandaran. His conquests in Western Asia were demonstrations of power and prestige and not aimed at annexation, in fact he left no lasting governance in Anatolia. His campaigns reshaped power dynamics, for example delaying Ottoman expansion.

Tamerlane's conquests in Western Asia were accompanied by genocidal massacres. William Rubinstein wrote: "In Assyria (1393–4)—Tamerlane got around—he killed all the Christians he could find, including everyone in the, then, Christian city of Tikrit, thus virtually destroying Assyrian Church of the East. Impartially, however, Tamerlane also slaughtered Shi'ite Muslims, Jews and heathens."

== Caucasus ==
Georgian Kingdom during the invasions of Timur.

The Kingdom of Georgia, a Christian kingdom dominated on the most of Caucasus, was subjected many times by Timur between 1386 and 1403. These conflicts were intimately linked with the wars between Timur and Tokhtamysh, the last khan of the Golden Horde. He officially proclaimed his invasions to be jihad against non-Muslims. Although Timur invaded the Georgia many times but he never made attempt to make Georgia a Muslim country. Timur personally led most of these raids to subdue the recalcitrant Georgian monarch. Kingdom of Georgia suffered a great loss due to these invasions and never recovered again. By the time George VII was forced to accept Timur's terms of peace and agree to pay tribute, he was a master of little more than gutted towns, ravaged countryside and a shattered monarchy.

Timur's first appearance in the Caucasus was a response to Tokhtamysh’s marauding inroad into Northern Iran through the Caucasian lands in 1385. After having overrun Azerbaijan and Kars, Timur marched into Georgia. Firstly he assailed Samtskhe atabegate, the principality of Kingdom of Georgia. From there, he marched against Tbilisi which the Georgian king Bagrat V had fortified. The city fell on November 21, 1386, and King Bagrat V was captured. However Bagrat V was given some 12,000 troops to reestablish himself in Georgia under Timur's suzerainty.

In the following years Timur invaded Georgia many times and remained victorious in most of conflicts. In spring of 1387, he returned to Georgia to take revenge for the ambush and escape.Timur captured and destroyed Erevan in the end this disaster resulted in 500 people were killed.In 1394, he again captured eastern provinces which were taken by Georgians during Tokhtamysh–Timur wars.

In 1395 the desperate Georgians allied themselves with Sidi Ali of Shekki and captured the Jalayirid prince, Tahir. This event prompted Timur to return, later in 1399. He took Shekki and devastated the neighboring region of Kakheti. In the spring of 1400, Timur moved back to destroy the Georgian state once and for all. He demanded that George VII should hand over the Jalayirid Tahir but George VII refused and met Timur at the Sagim River in Lower Kartli, but suffered a defeat. After the war, of those who survived the fighting and reprisals, many thousands died of hunger and disease, and 60,000 survivors were enslaved and carried away by Timur's troops.

In late 1401, Timur invaded the Caucasus once again. George VII had to sue for peace, and sent his brother with the contributions. Timur made peace with George VII on condition that the King of Georgia supplied him troops during his campaign against Ottoman Empire and granted the Muslims special privileges. Once the Ottomans were defeated, Timur, back to Erzurum in 1402, decided to punish the king of Georgia for not having come to present his congratulations on his victory. Historians reported that 700 towns were destroyed and their inhabitants massacred by Timurid forces.

George VII had to pay a huge tribute in the name of Timur. After the tribute, Timur made peace with George VII and then finally he left Caucasus permanently. All the territories from Beylagan to Trebizond were officially given by Timur as an appanage to his grandson Khalil Sultan.

== Eastern Europe ==
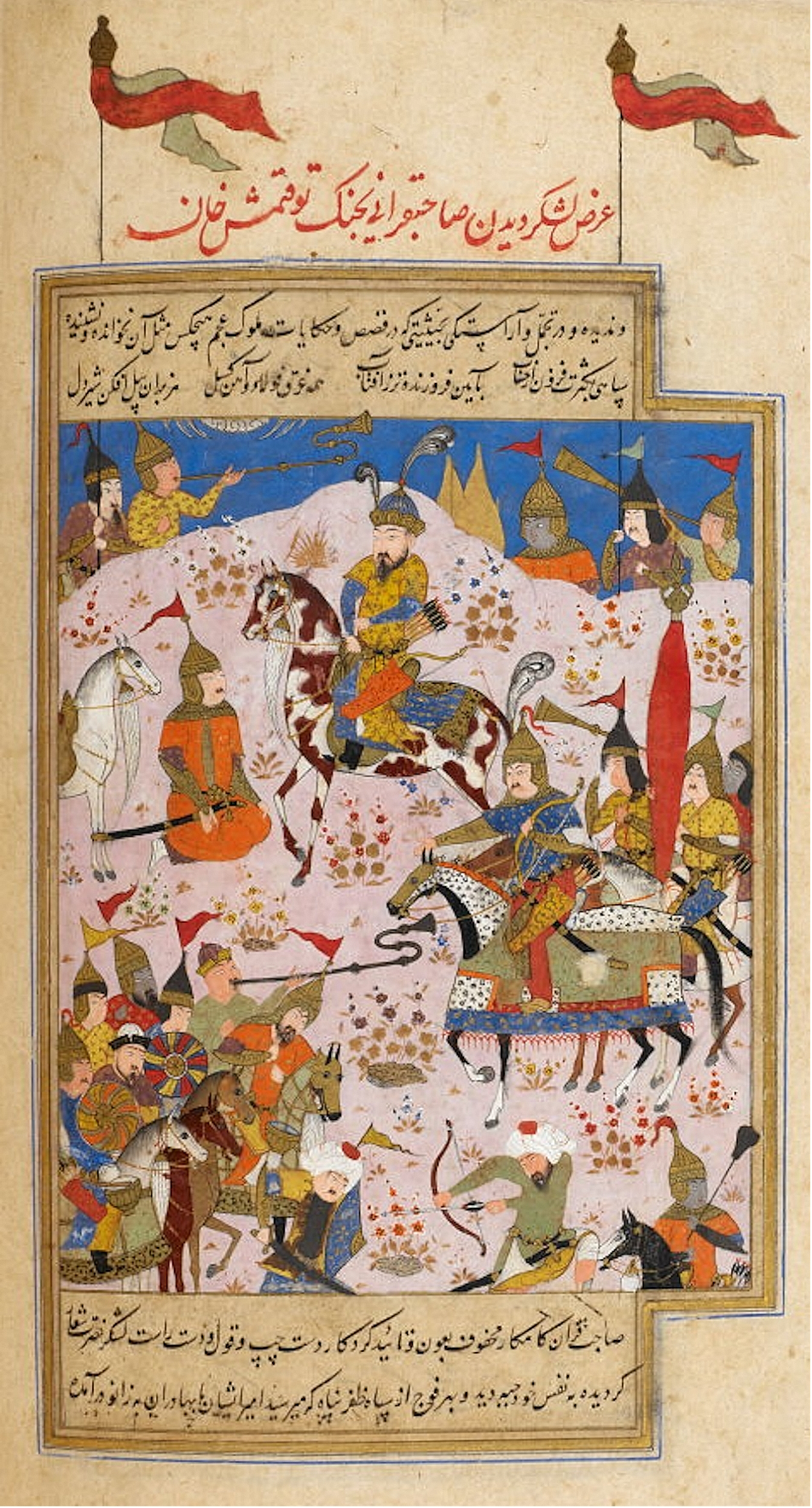
Timur and his troops launching a war against Tokhtamysh of Golden Horde.

The Golden Horde was a fragment of the Mongol Empire mainly located in Eastern Europe. After the death of Jochi, the eldest son of Genghis Khan and khan of the Golden Horde, the Golden Horde itself divided into many wings with mainly White and Blue wings among Jochi's descendants. In the late 1370s and early 1380s, Timur firstly helped Tokhtamysh against his uncle Urus Khan to assume supreme power in the White wing and then in the unification of the Golden Horde. Timur also supported him in the siege of Moscow in 1382 and received tribute from Muscovy.

After being established, Tokhtamysh invaded Azerbaijan and northwest Iran in 1385 when Timur was busy in his conquest of Persia. Tokhtamysh plundered Tabriz. The inevitable response by Timur resulted in the major-scale war between them. The initial battle was fought between them at Volga River in 1391 which became victorious for Timur and allowed Tokhtamysh with his remaining army to escape. Despite the defeat, Tokhtamysh recovered his position and in the spring of 1395 raided the Timurid territory of Shirvan.

At that time Timur then counter-attacked, reconquering his own territories and advanced into the Caucasus region. In 1395, Timur defeated Tokhtamysh in the Battle of the Terek River, concluding the struggle between them. In the same year, Timur plundered Sarai, the capital of the Golden Horde and other important cities including Ukek, Majar, Azaq and Astrakhan. After the battle of Terek River, Tokhtamysh was deposed and fled to the Ukrainian steppes where he asked for help from Grand Duke Vytautas of Lithuania, no aid was granted.

Timur installed Edigu on the throne under his suzerainty in place of Tokhtamysh, the Golden Horde became a tributary of Timur and the boundaries of Timurid Empire were secured. The Golden Horde never recovered again from this and in the middle of the 15th century, it fragmented into smaller khanates: the Kazan Khanate, Nogai Horde, Qasim Khanate, Crimean Khanate and Astrakhan Khanate. This led to the decline of Tatar-Mongol rule over Russian lands and thus in 1480, the Grand duchy of Moscow became free from paying tribute to the Tatar-Mongols.

== Gallery ==
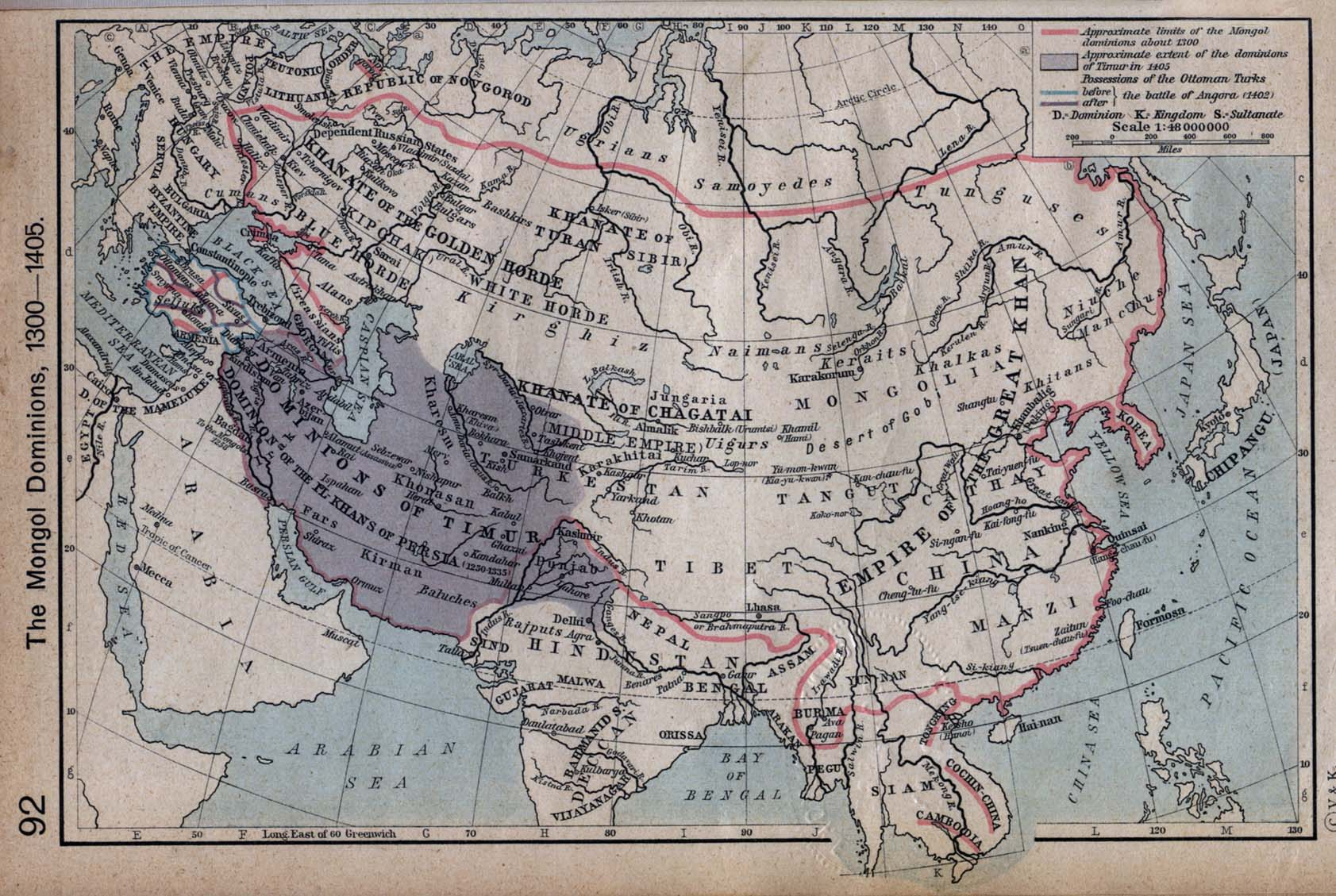
The Mongol dominions, 1300–1405; the Timurid Empire is shaded. Timur is also protector of Mongol dominions.

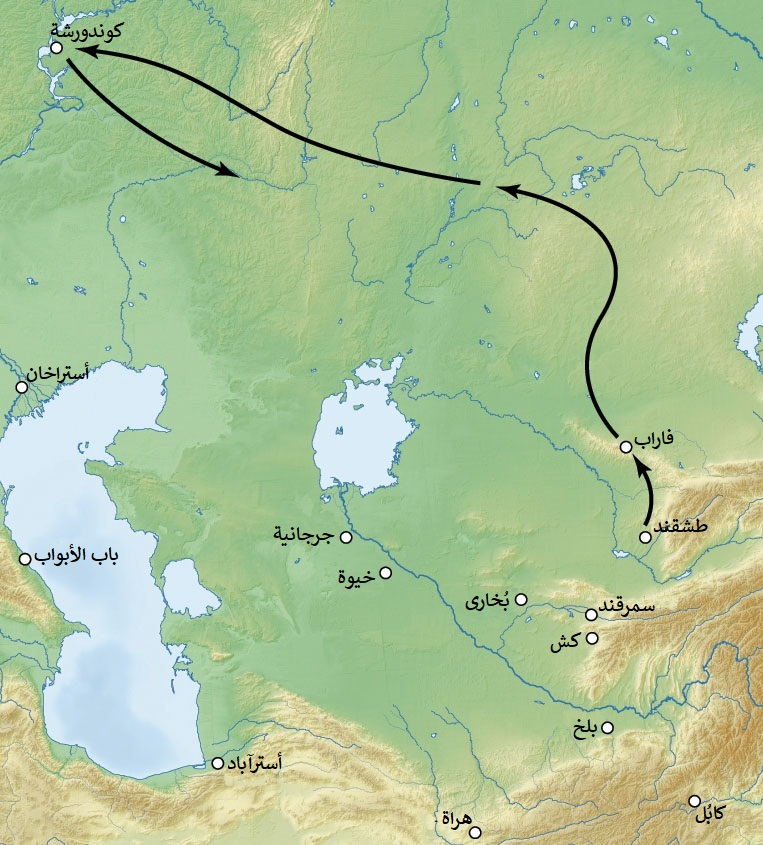
Timur's movements, 1391–1392

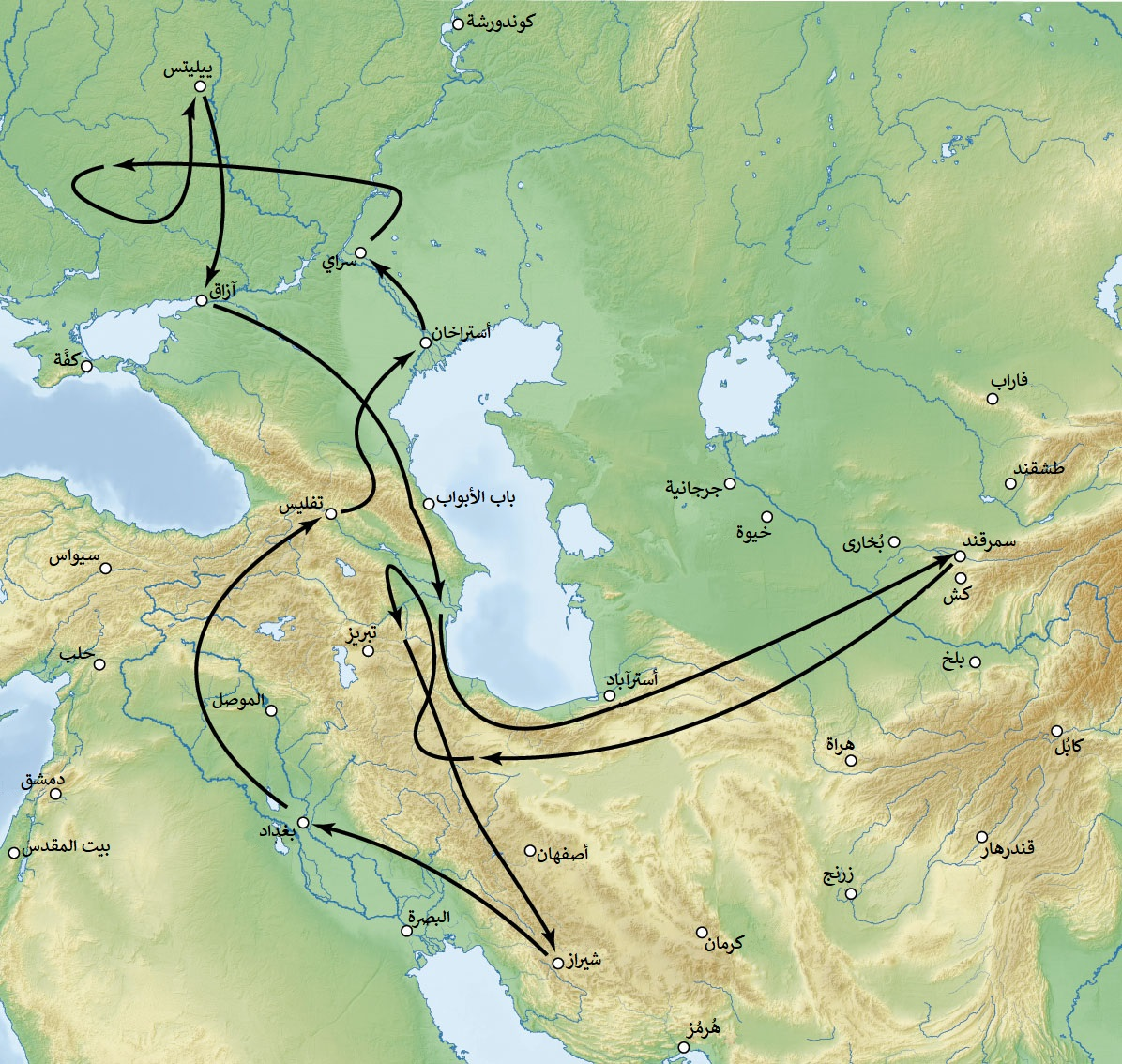
Timur's movements, 1392–1396.

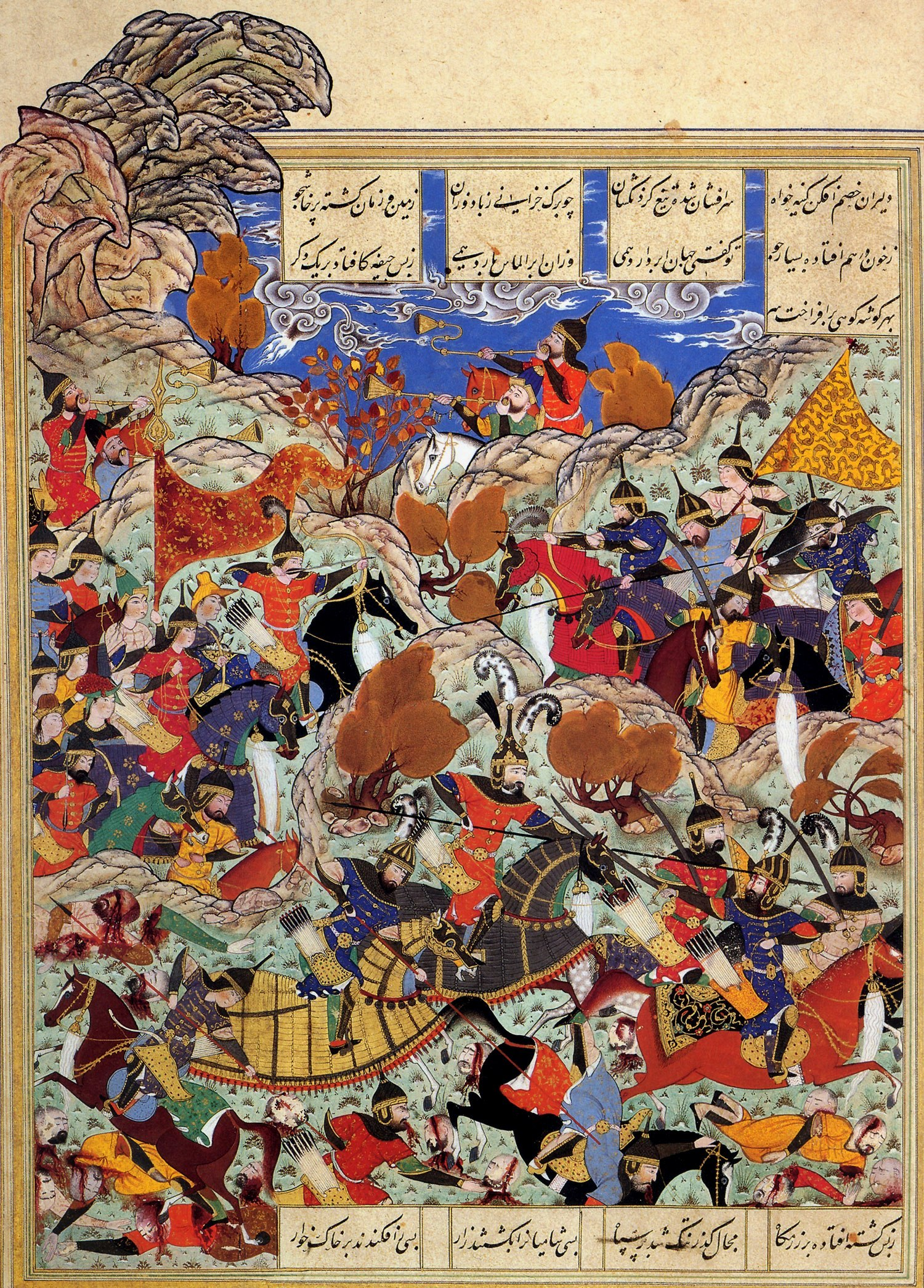
Timur defeats Mamluk Sultan, An-Nasir Faraj

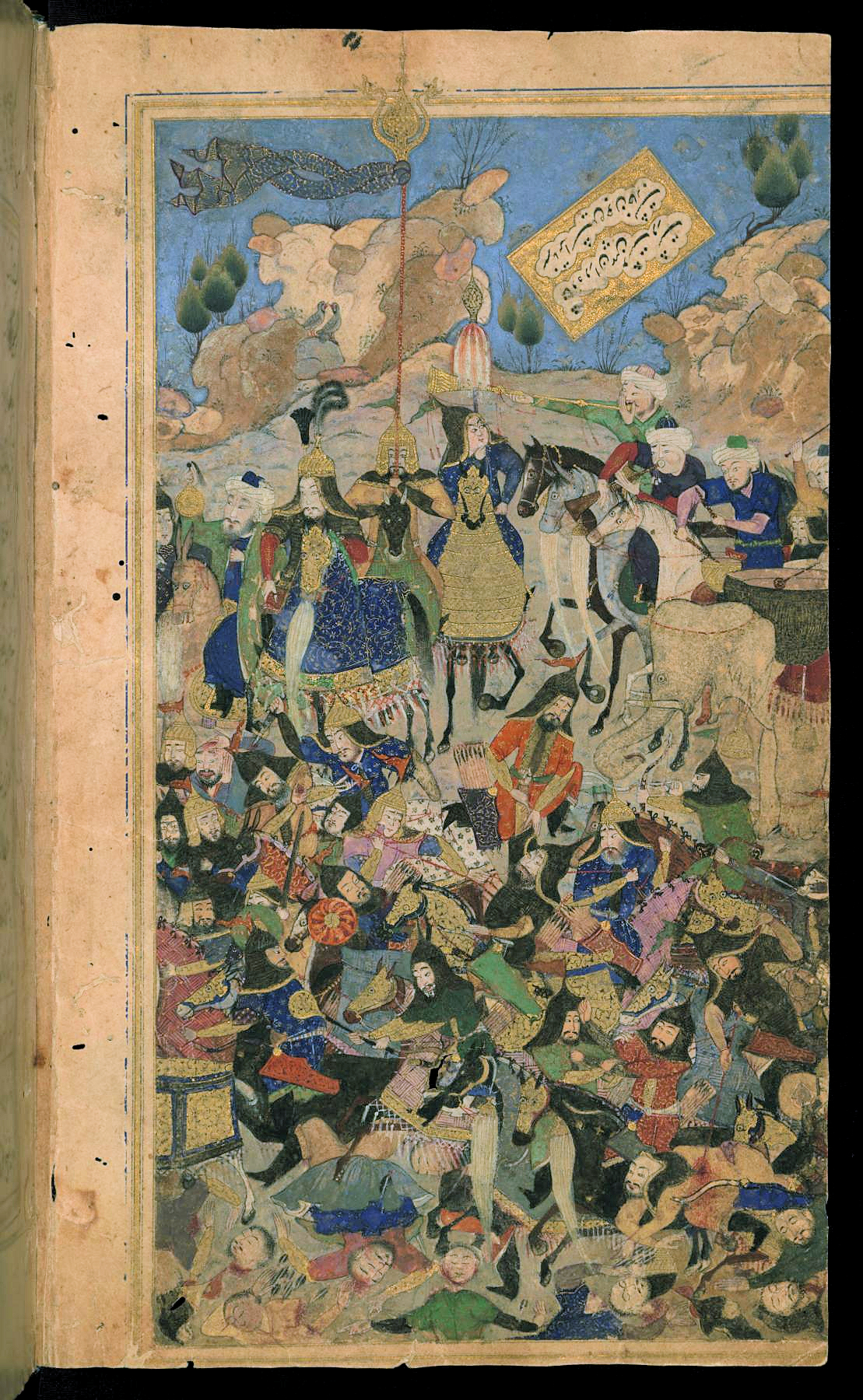
Timur defeats the Golden Horde and its Kipchak warriors led by Tokhtamysh.

== See also ==
- List of wars by death toll
