= Qamaruddin Khan =

Qamaruddin Khan may refer to:

- Qamar-ud-din Khan Dughlat Mongol ruler of Moghulistan
- Asaf Jah I, Mughal noble and founder of the Asaf Jahi dynasty
- Mir Muhammad Fazil, Mughal noble
- Bismillah Khan (born Qamaruddin Khan), Indian musician
