= Saray Mulk Khanum =

Saray Mulk
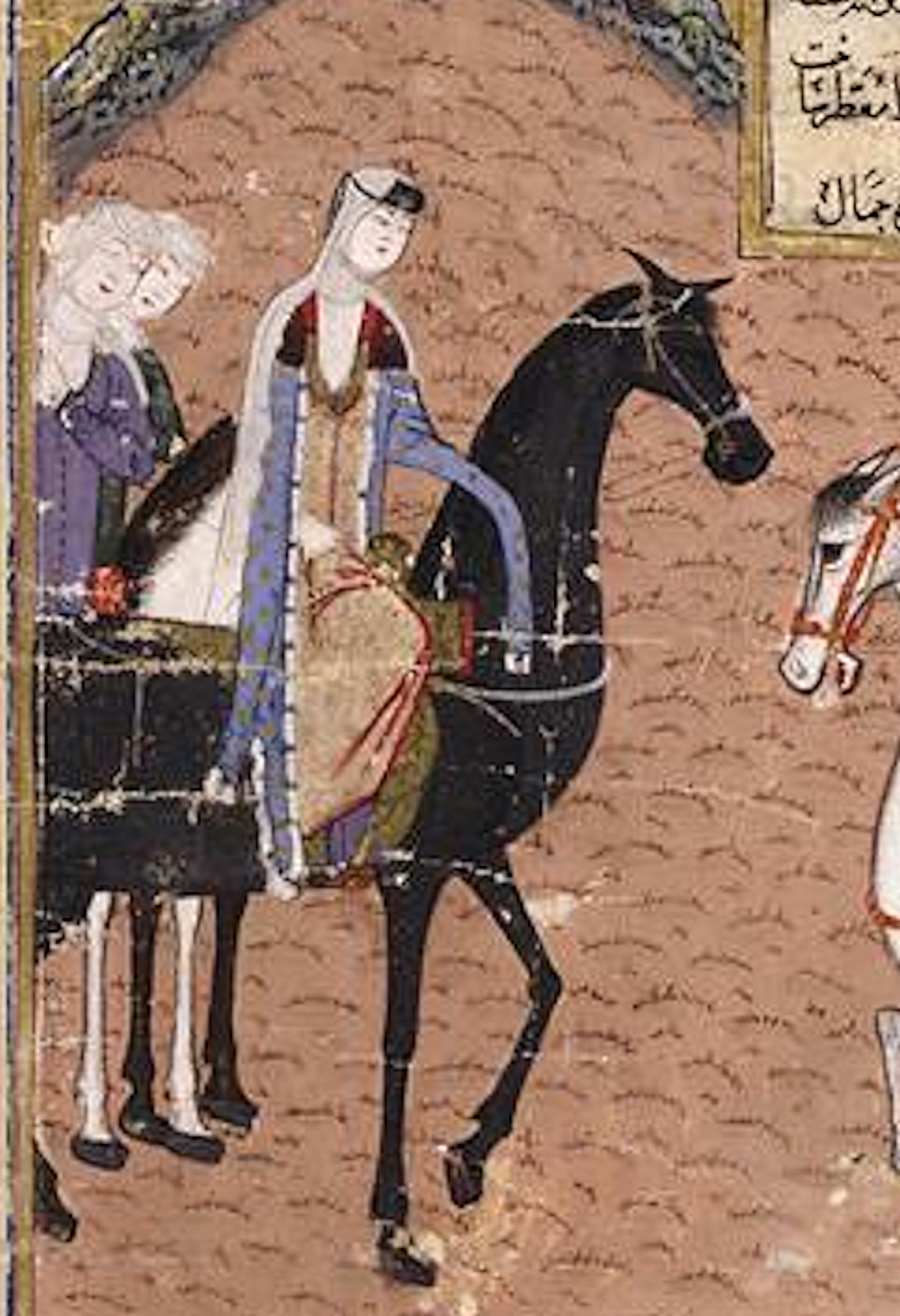
- Timur's wife, Saray Mulk Khanum in 1387, visiting Timur in camp. Zafarnama of 1435–36.

Emir consort of the Timurid Empire
- Tenure: c. 1370 – 1405
- Born: c. 1341
- Died: c. 1408 (aged 66–67); Samarkand, Timurid Empire
- Spouse: Amir Husayn of Balkh; Timur
- Issue: Shah Rukh (possibly)
Names
- Saray Mulk
- House: Borjigin (by birth); Barlas Timurid (by marriage)
- Father: Qazan Khan ibn Yasaur
- Mother: Burla-khatun
- Religion: Islam

Saray Mulk Khanum (Chagatai: سرای ملک خانم; c. 1341 – 1408) was a senior consort of the Timurid Empire as the chief consort of Timur, also known as Tamerlane, the founder of the empire as well as the dynasty.

By birth, she was a princess of Moghulistan as a daughter of Qazan Khan ibn Yasaur and was also a direct descendant of Genghis Khan.

== Family and lineage ==
Saray Mulk Khanum was born a princess of Moghulistan in c. 1341 to Qazan Khan ibn Yasaur, the last Khan of the Chagatai Khanate. Saray's grandfather was Khan Yasa'ur, her father's predecessor and a great-great-grandson of Chagatai Khan. She was therefore, a direct descendant of Genghis Khan, the Great Khan (Emperor) and founder of the Mongol Empire. Saray was thus, a member of the House of Borjigin, the most renowned family clan in Eurasia.

Being the daughter of a Khan, Saray held the title of Khanum ("daughter of a Khan or princess") by birth.

== Marriage to Timur ==
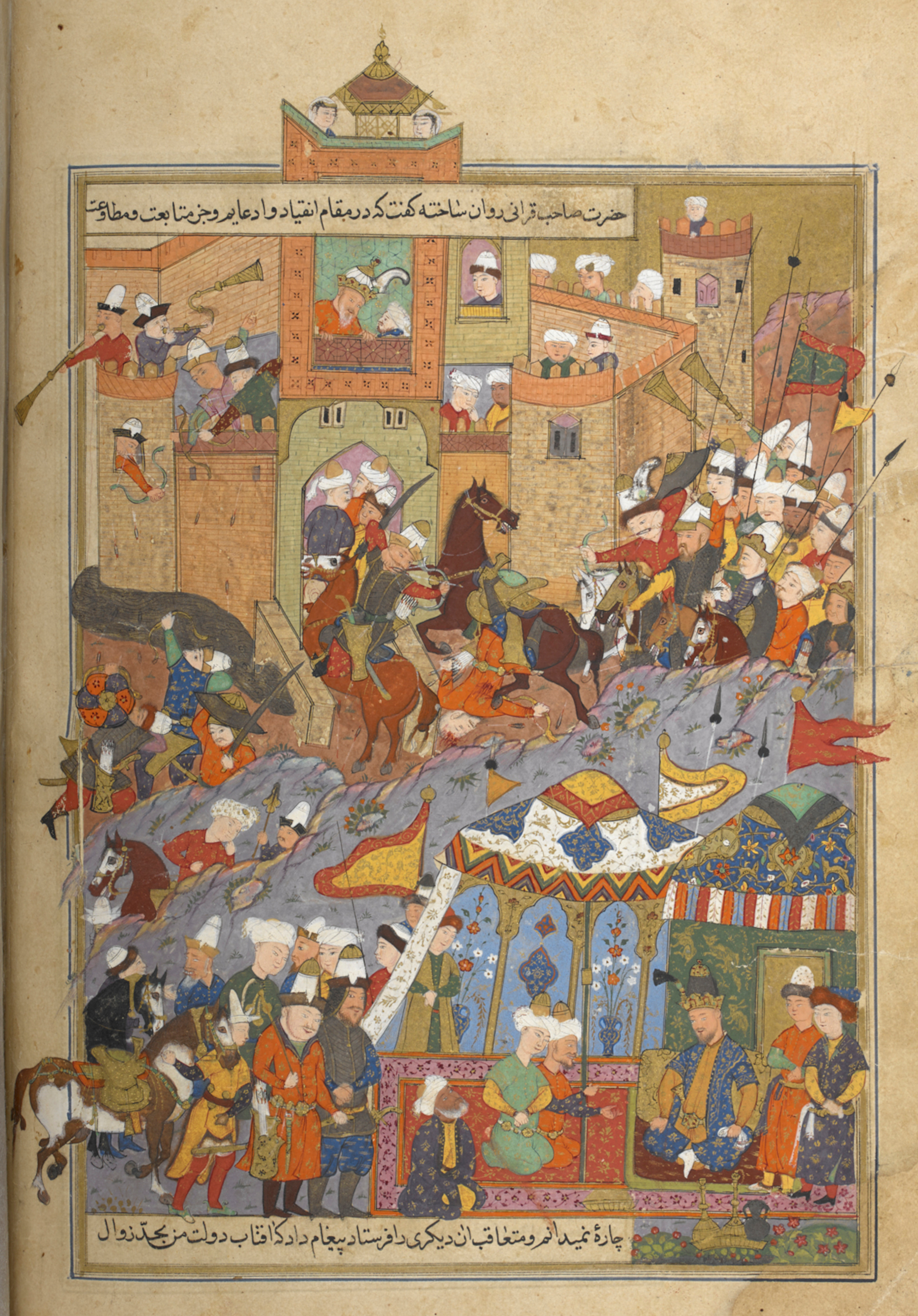
Timur commanding the attack during the Siege of Balkh (1370)

Before her marriage to Timur, Saray had been previously married to her husband's predecessor, Amir Husayn of Balkh. When in 1370, Timur defeated and thereafter executed Husayn after the Siege of Balkh, he seized the harem of his predecessor and took to himself the latter's wives, one of whom being Saray Mulk Khanum. Saray was five years younger than Timur and was said to be very beautiful, sometimes described as possessing "surpassing" beauty.

As the daughter of a Khan and a descendant of Genghis Khan, Saray enjoyed the status of Timur's senior wife, although in her first husband's harem the chief wife was a daughter of Khan Tarmashirin, who after Husayn's fall was married to the Jalayir Khan Bahram. Through his marriage to Saray, Timur acquired the right to the surname Gurgan ("son-in-law") of Qazan Khan, which appears on his coins and often in the Mamluk sources. The title of gurgan was very important for Timur because it was indicative of his relations with the family of the Chughtai. In 1397, Timur married Tukal-Khanum, a daughter of the Mongol Khan Khizr Khoja, who skipped over several other wives due to her exalted lineage and took the second place in the harem, inferior in status only to Saray. Saray, therefore, held the position of being Timur's chief consort until his death.

Little is known of Saray and Timur's relationship, apart from the fact that she was his confidante and one of his closest advisers, but it is clear that she wielded great influence over her husband and in the Empire. She is also cited by most sources to have been Timur's "favourite" and his beloved wife. Saray also sometimes acted as regent during Timur's absences from Samarkand as a result of his western campaigns and wielded great authority at Court. As Timur's chief consort, Saray additionally held the title of "Great Empress" similar to the title held by Genghis Khan's chief wife, Börte. The Spanish ambassador, Ruy Gonzáles de Clavijo, who was sent by Henry III of Castile to visit Timur's court in 1405, called Saray, "The Grand Khanum".

In May 1394, Saray along with Timur's other wives followed her husband with the ughruq to Armenia and Transcaucasia where Ibrahim was born. In September, they returned to Sultaniya, but some time later were again summoned to join Timur. In the spring of 1395, both the Saray and Tukal with the children were sent to Samarkand, where Shahrukh had been staying since the autumn of 1394. In 1396, they were all in Khuzar, meeting Timur on his return from his "Five Years" campaign. During the Indian campaign, Saray Mulk Khanum and Ulugh accompanied Timur only as far as Kabul. In August 1398, Timur sent them back to Samarkand from the neighbourhood of Kabul.

=== Issue ===
Saray did not have any children with Timur, though she is sometimes referred to as the mother of her husband's youngest son, Shahrukh Mirza, who was actually born of a concubine. Even if Saray had any children with her husband, they did not survive, and neither did Tukal-Khanum's, and yet their power and influence were well noted by foreign visitors to the Court. It was the two Chingisid princesses' personal qualities and pedigree that allowed them to develop such a prestigious dynastic position, since with Timurid consorts maternity was not in itself a path to power. Upon the birth of Shahrukh's eldest son, Ulugh Beg, in 1394, he was also, like his father, placed in Saray's care and grew up under the supervision of the Empress.

== Clavijo's account of the Empress ==
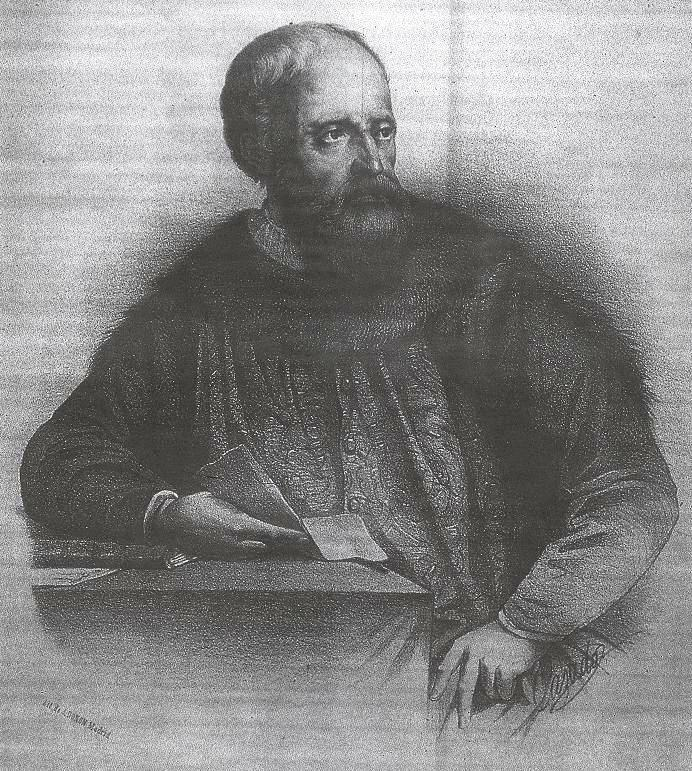
Ruy González de Clavijo, the Spanish ambassador who was sent by Henry III of Castile to the Timurid imperial court at Samarkand

Although the Spanish ambassador, Ruy Gonzáles de Clavijo, probably did not intend it, his description of "Cano" (The Great Khanum), Timur's chief wife, as she entered the great pavilion serves as a potent metaphor for much that he witnessed during his sojourn in Samarkand, the capital of Timurid Empire, between 8 September and 20 November 1404. As the ambassador of Henry III of Castile, Clavijo enjoyed generous access to the life and ceremony of the Timurid imperial court and left one of the most detailed and lengthy accounts of their settings. "Cano" identifiable as Empress Saray, had come to join her husband, Timur, for a great feast, one of the several arranged at the Khan-i-Gil (lit. Mine of clay) meadow located outside Samarkand.

Clavijo offers an expanded description of Saray's procession into the pavilion and of what she was wearing. Joined by fifteen servants to carry her train, eunuchs, and a male servant carrying a "shade" (sombra), Saray Mulk Khanum was dressed in red silk, her face covered by a white veil. She wore a complex headdress, fashioned from red fabric ornamented with pearls, rubies, turquoise, feathers, and held together with gold wire.

Clavijo estimated about 300 attendants making up her royal suite. Her doubly screened face — one screen a cloth veil, the other a thick layer of applied make-up — concealed her true identity. The face that dimly showed beneath her veil was so thickly covered with white lead to protect from the Sun, that it looked as if it were made of paper.

== Patron of education ==
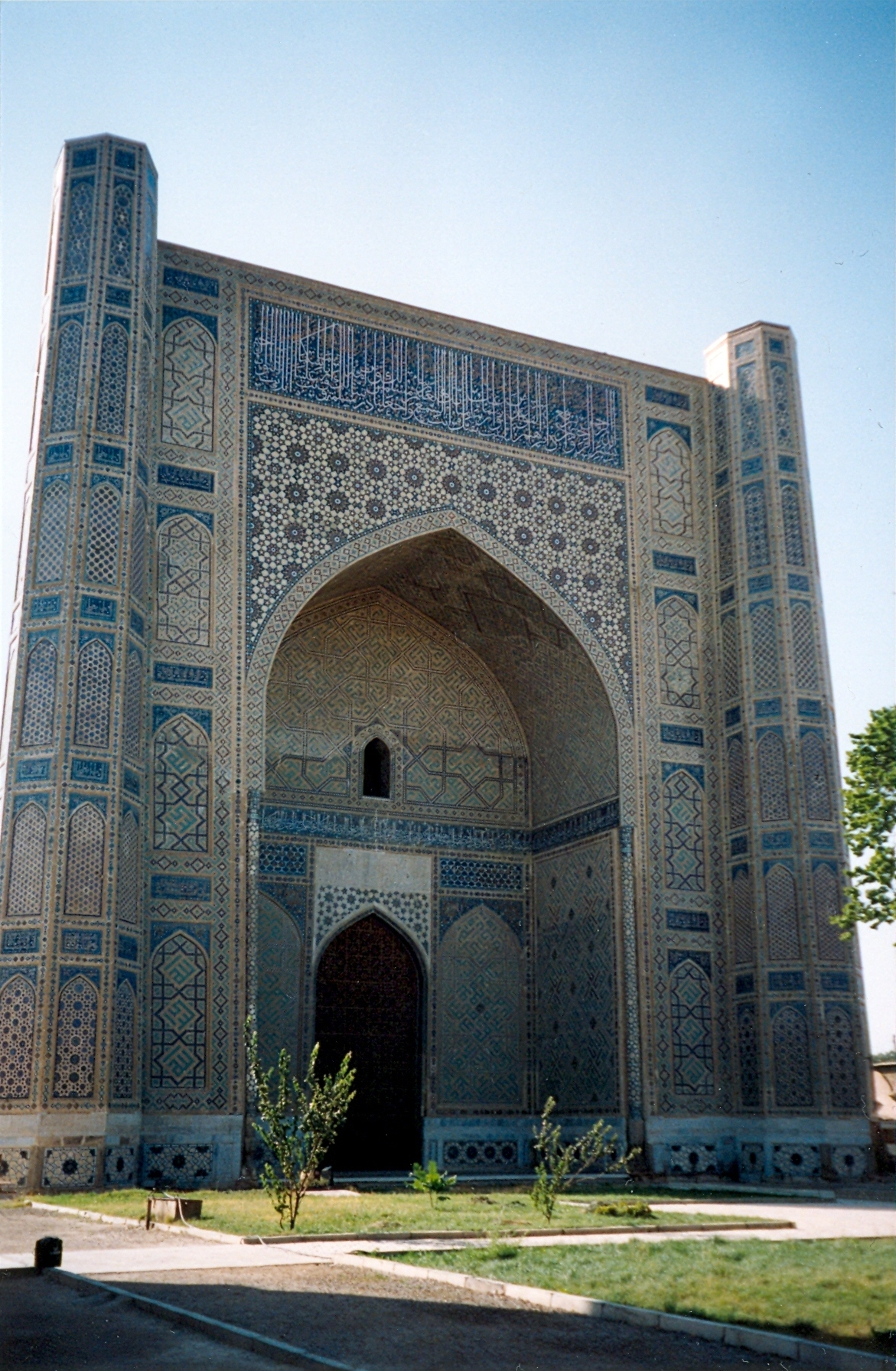
The Bibi Khanym Mosque in Samarkand was named after Saray by her husband

One of the most important buildings of the late 14th century in Samarkand was the Khanum madrasa, opposite the great mosque of Timur. The madrasa was commissioned by Empress Saray in c. 1397 as she was interested in patronizing education and was built by her orders at the capital of the Timurid Empire: Samarkand. Saray had commissioned many other buildings, but only the Khanum madrasa foundations remain to this day.

== See also ==
- Chagatai Khanate
- Timur

== Bibliography ==
- Brummett, Palmira Johnson (2009). The 'Book' of Travels: Genre, Ethnology, and Pilgrimage, 1250–1700. BRILL . ISBN 978-90-04-17498-6.
