= Qamar-ud-din Khan Dughlat =

Qamar-ud-din Khan Dughlat Muslim
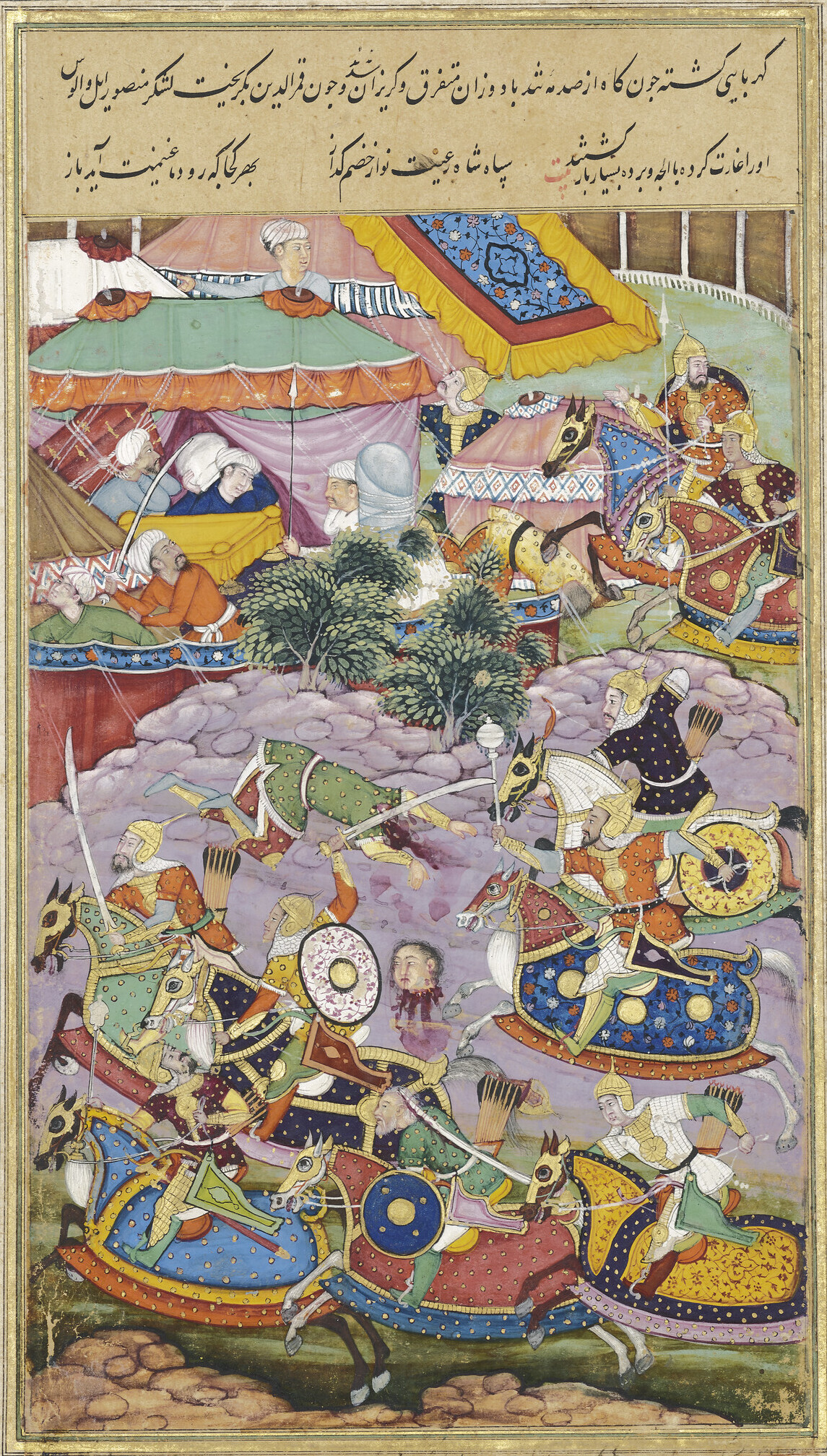
- Timur's forces led by his son Umar Shaykh defeating the army of Qamar al-Din; a folio from the royal Mughal Zafarnama, by Jagjivan Kalan, Mughal India, c. 1595-1600

Khan of Moghulistan
- Reign: 1368–1390
- Predecessor: Ilyas Khoja
- Successor: Khizr Khoja
- Born: unknown
- Died: 1390
- House: Dughlat
- Religion: Sunni İslam

Qamar-ud-din Khan Dughlat Muslim (Chagatai and Persian: مسلمان قمر الدین خان دغلت) was a Moghul ruler of Moghulistan between 1368 and 1390. He belonged to the Dughlat clan of Mongol warlords. and from his mother's side, he was descended from Arab Muslim Commander Qutayba ibn Muslim. He was not a descendant of Chingghis Khan or Chagatai Khan, thus he was not a member of the Borjigin clan.

Under Tughlugh Timur, both Amirs Tuluk and Bulaji had held the office of ulus beg. After the death of Bulaji the office was given to his son Khudaidad. This was contested by Bulaji's brother, Qamar-ud-din, who desired to be ulus beg himself. His request for the office to be transferred to him was refused by Tughlugh Timur; consequently after the latter's death Qamar-ud-din revolted against Tughlugh Timur's son Ilyas Khoja Khan.

He was likely responsible for the death of Ilyas Khoja; most of the family members of Tughlugh Timur were also killed. Qamar-ud-din proclaimed himself khan, the only Dughlat ever to do so and although he did not gain the support of many of the amirs, managed to maintain his position in Moghulistan.

Qamar-ud-din's reign consisted of a series of wars with Amir Timur, the Amir of Timurid Empire of Central Asia. Qamar-ud-din's forces were unable to defeat the Great Timur Lane, but at the same time Timur could not decisively defeat Qamar-ud-din, whose men were able to retreat into the barren steppe country of Moghulistan. During a fresh invasion by Timur and his army in 1390, however, Qamar-ud-din disappeared. His disappearance enabled a Chagatayid, Khizr Khoja, to gain control of Moghulistan.

Qamar-ud-din's disappearance had left his nephew Khudaidad the senior member of the Dughlat family. Khudaidad had a very good knowledge about Genghis Khan's Yasa(law), which was an example of the Dughlats' continued respect for the Mongolian tradition. According to the Tarikh-i Rashidi, Khudaidad had been an early supporter of Khizr Khoja and had hid him from Qamar-ud-din during the latter's purge of members of the house of Chagatai. Khudaidad's power rapidly increased and he became a king-maker in the years after Khizr Khoja's death. He also divided Aksu, Khotan, and Kashgar and Yarkand amongst his family members; this division of territory lasted until the time of Mirza Abu Bakr Dughlat.

Preceded by Ilyas Khoja	Moghul Khan; 1368–1390	Succeeded by Khizr Khoja
