= Ilyas Khoja =

Khan of Moghulistan from 1363 to 1368

Khan of Moghulistan
- Reign: 1363–1368
- Predecessor: Tughlugh Timur
- Successor: Qamar-ud-din Khan Dughlat
- Died: 1368

Ilyas Khoja (Chagatai and Persian: الیاس خواجه; died 1368) was Khan in Transoxiana (1363) and Khan of Moghulistan from 1363 to 1368. He was the son of Tughlugh Timur.

== Biography ==
In 1363, Tughlugh Timur, who had recently taken control of Transoxiana and had executed many of its local leaders, appointed Ilyas Khoja as its ruler. The ruthlessness with which the Moghuls ruled the region caused many to oppose them, including Amir Husayn of the Qara'unas and Amir Timur of the Barlas. Together they faced an army of Moghuls and local tribes loyal to Ilyas Khoja, and defeated them at the battle of Stone Bridge. Shortly afterwards, Tughlugh Timur died and Ilyas Khoja left for Moghulistan to take power.

In 1365, Ilyas Khoja returned to Transoxiana. In May, he defeated Amir Husayn and Timur at the battle of Tashkent, but when he arrived before the gates of Samarkand its inhabitants refused to let him enter, and the subsequent siege was disastrous. A plague among the horses deprived the Moghuls of their power, and they were forced to leave Transoxiana again.

In 1368, Ilyas Khoja died. The Dughlat amir Qamar ud-Din then usurped the khanship; he was probably responsible for Ilyas Khoja's death. Much of the khan's family was murdered, but his brother Khizr Khoja, who would eventually regain Moghulistan for the line of Chagatai Khan, was safely hidden.

Preceded by Tughlugh Timur	Moghul Khan; 1363–1368	Succeeded by Qamar Ud-Din
Preceded by Tughlugh Timur	Khan in Transoxiana; 1363	Succeeded by Adil-Sultan
