= Khizr Khoja =

Khan of Moghulistan from 1390 to 1399

Khizr Khoja Khan

Khan of Moghulistan
- Reign: 1390–1399
- Predecessor: Qamar-ud-din Khan Dughlat
- Successor: Shams-i-Jahan
- Born: c. 1363
- Died: 1399 (aged 35–36)
- Issue: Shams-i-Jahan; Muhammad Khan; Tukal Khanum
- House: Borjigin
- Father: Tughlugh Timur

Khizr Khwaja Khan (Chagatai and Persian: خضر خواجه خان; d. 1399, also known as Khizr Khoja) was the son of Tughlugh Timur and Khan of Moghulistan during the Chagatai Khanate, reigning from 1390 to 1399 AD.

== Reign as Khan of Moghulistan ==
Khizr Khoja took the throne of Moghulistan after the defeat of Qamar-ud-din Khan Dughlat by Timur in 1390.

Tarikh-i-Rashidi by Mirza Muhammad Haidar Dughlat says that Tughluk Timur Khán's youngest son was Khizir Khwája Khán, and that while he was yet at his mother's breast, he was saved from the cruelty and enmity of Kamaruddin by Mir Ághá, the mother of Amir Khudáidád. When the child attained twelve years, his friends, still fearing Amir Kamaruddin, took him from Káshghar.

Amir Khudáidád wished to send a few trustworthy men with him, but Mir Ághá opposed this plan, saying: "Do not send any of your own servants, for when the boy becomes Khán, base born people [such as they] will become influential, and then they will prove enemies to yourself and your children. They will imagine that the people do not pay them sufficient respect, but say among themselves, ‘These are only servants.’ For this reason rather send others than your own retainers—send strangers." So twelve men were sent, and each eventually became an Amir. Many of their descendants are alive now. Among their number was Arjirák, from whom are descended the Amirs of Itárji; Tájri of Khwárizm, from whom are sprung the Amirs of Kunji; while another was of the tribe of Chálish Siádi [or Sayyádi]; and his sons also became Amirs, with the style [lakab] of Kushji, but they are also called Kukildásh.

They took Khizir Khwája Khán up to the hills which lie between Badakhshán and Káshghar. But the spies of Kamaruddin got news of his hiding-place, so he abandoned it and fled to the hills of Khotan. Fearing discovery, he went on to Yellow Uyghurs, Jurján, and Lob Katak, where he remained for twelve years. On the death of Kamaruddin, search was made for Khizir Khwája Khán, and Amir Khudáidád sent for him from where he was in hiding. As soon as he was brought in, Khudáidád called the people together and raised him to the Khánship. Thus did the splendour of the Khán come to illumine the sovereignty of the Moghuls, so that the affairs of Moghulistán prospered. The Khán then concluded a peace with Amir Timur, who formed an alliance with him by marrying Tavakkul Khánim, a maiden from the royal haram.

== Family ==
Two of Khizr Khoja's sons, Shams-i-Jahan and Muhammad Khan, served successively as rulers of Moghulistan. They were followed by a third Khan, Naqsh-i-Jahan. An exact relationship between this ruler and Khizr Khoja is difficult to establish due to contradictions in various sources from this period. Naqsh-i-Jahan may therefore either be a son of Khizr Khoja himself, or his grandson by Shams-i-Jahan. Khizr Khoja's daughter, Tukal Khanum, was married in 1397 to the Central Asian conqueror Timur.

== Genealogy ==
Genealogy of Chughatai Khanates

In Babr Nama written by Babur, Page 19, Chapter 1; described genealogy of his maternal grandfather Yunas Khan as:

"Yunas Khan descended from Chaghatai Khan, the second son of Chingiz Khan (as follows,) Yunas Khan, son of Wais Khan, son of Sher-'ali Aughlon, son of Muhammad Khan, son of Khizr Khwaja Khan, son of Tughluq-timur Khan, son of Aisan-bugha Khan, son of Dawa Khan, son of Baraq Khan, son of Yesuntawa Khan, son of Muatukan, son of Chaghatai Khan, son of Chingiz Khan"

Genealogy of Khizr Khoja Khan according to the Tarikh e Rashidi of Mirza Muhammad Haidar Dughlat
1. Chingiz Khan; 2. Chaghatai Khan; 3. Mutukan; 4. Yesü Nto'a; 5. Ghiyas-ud-din Baraq; 6. Duwa; 7. Esen Buqa I	8. Tughlugh Timur; 9. Khizr Khoja; 10. Muhammad Khan (Khan of Moghulistan); 11. Shir Ali Oglan; 12. Uwais Khan (Vais Khan); 13. Yunus Khan; 14. Ahmad Alaq	15. Sultan Said Khan; 16. Abdurashid Khan; 17. Abdul Karim Khan (Yarkand)

Preceded by Qamar Ud-Din	Chagatai Khanate; 1389–1399	Succeeded by Shams-i-Jahan
