= Amir Husayn =

Emir of Transoxiana (1364–1370)

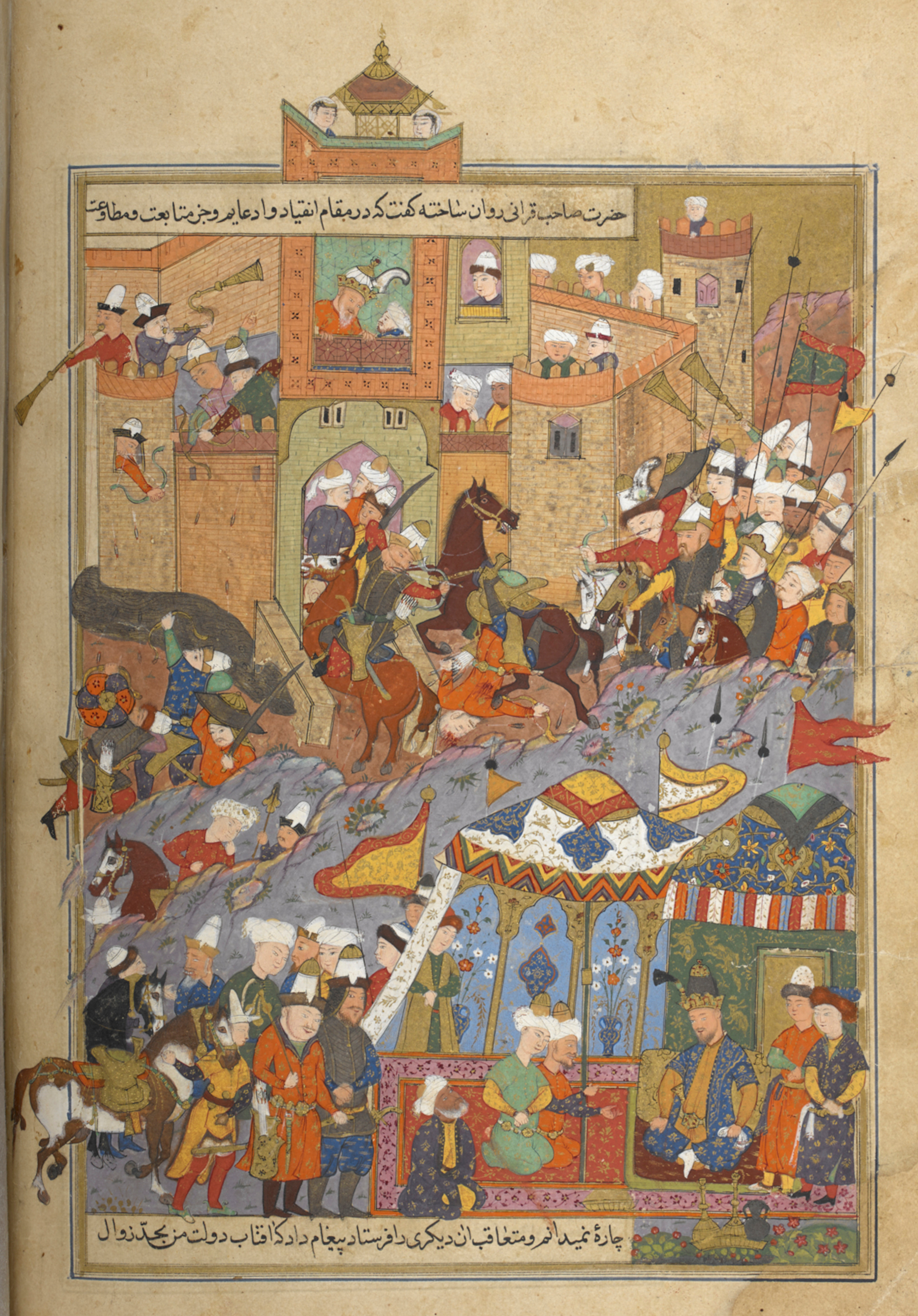
Timur commanding the Siege of Balkh (1370)

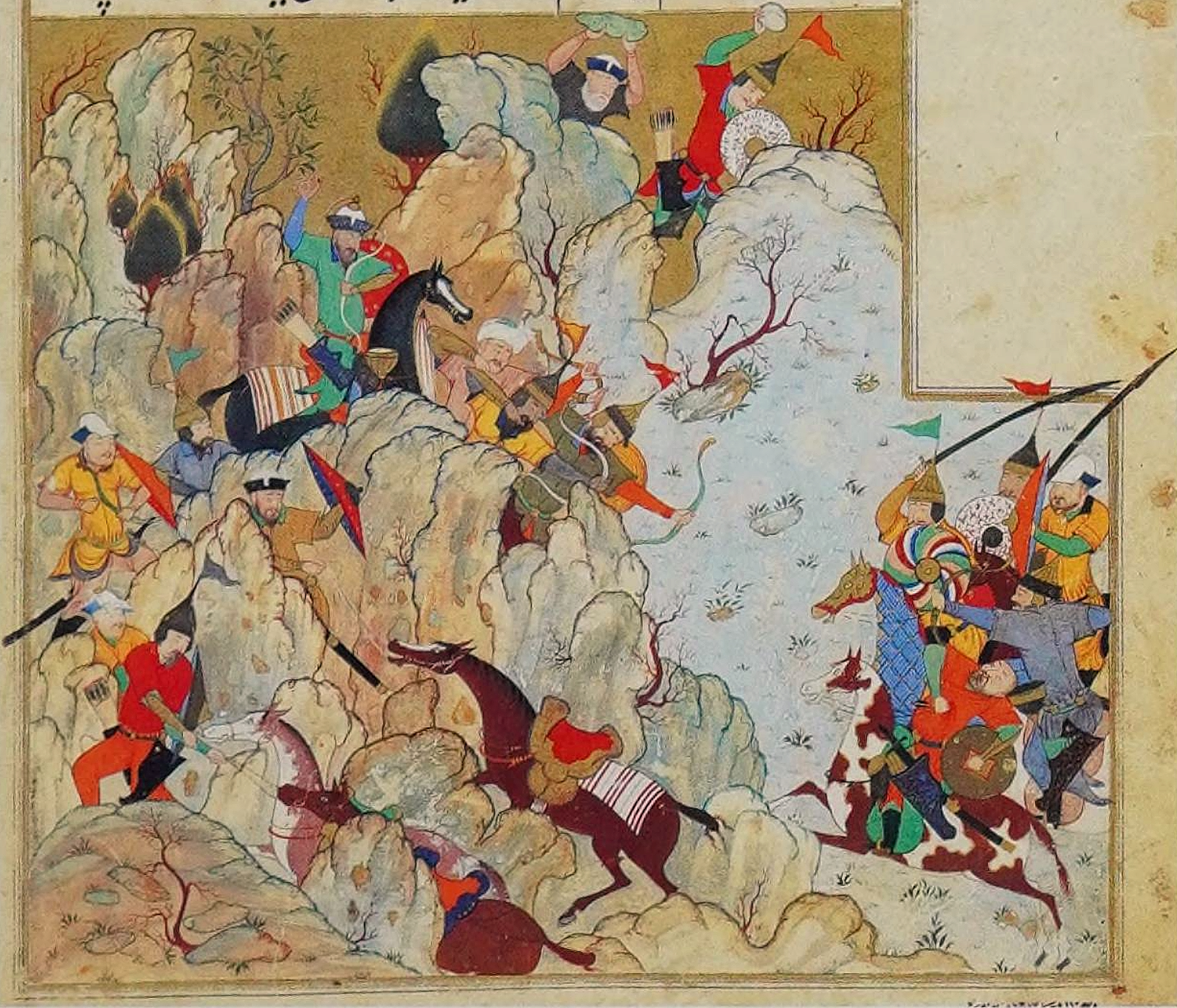
Timur attacks the forces of Amir Husayn at Tang-i Haram. Zafarnama, (c.1486-1487).

Amir Husayn (Amir Husayn ibn Amir Wali, died 1370) was a member of the Qara'unas, a Mongol military elite group of mixed Mongol and Turkic origin, and held de facto power over the Chagatai Khanate in the later 14th century. Amir Husayn was initially an ally, and later an opponent of Timur.

Amir Husayn was the grandson of Qazaghan (died 1358), a powerful amir who ruled Transoxiana (modern Uzbekistan and surrounding areas) and also held de facto power under the Chagatai Khanate. He was the son of Abdullah bin Qazaghan. After the death of Qazaghan, the political situation in Transoxiana destabilized. Both Amir Husayn and Timur (then a young military leader) formed an alliance to regain control of the region. Timur married Husayn's sister, strengthening their alliance.

== Alliance between Timur and Amir Husayn ==
Following Tughlugh's death in 1363, Timur and Amir Husayn took over Transoxiana. Timur and Amir Husayn forced Tughlugh's successor Ilyas Khoja out of Transoxania in 1365.

Amir Husayn became increasingly autocratic and alienated both the nobility and Timur. By the early 1370s, open conflict erupted between the two. Amir Husayn focused on restoring traditional Mongol-Chagatai authority, which clashed with Timur’s ambitions and pragmatism. The relationship between them became strained after Husayn abandoned efforts to carry out Timur's orders to finish off Ilyas Khoja (former governor of Mawarannah) close to Tashkent.

== Conflict ==
In 1370 Timur decided to attack Amir Husayn at Balkh. After crossing the Amu Darya at Termez his army surrounded the city. Husayn's army came out of the city to attack Timur's men, perhaps suggesting that they were unhappy to find themselves being besieged. The same occurred on the second day of the battle, but this time Timur's men managed to get into the city. Husayn shut himself up inside the citadel, leaving Timur's men to sack the city. After capturing the city, Timur executed Khabul Shah, the Husayn's puppet Khan of Western Chagatai and installed Suurgatmish on the throne of Khan as his puppet. This made Timur the main power in Mawarannahr and Western Chagatai Khanate with supremacy over Central Asia.

After the Siege of Balkh (1370), Timur defeated Amir Husayn in battle, captured him, and had him executed. This victory marked Timur's rise as the supreme ruler of Transoxiana, setting the stage for his later conquests across Central Asia, Persia, and beyond. Like his predecessors, Timur maintained a puppet khan (Soyurgatmish) on the throne to legitimize his rule, but his khans were members of the house of Ögedei rather than descendants of Chagatai.

=== Harem ===
Timur seized the harem of Amir Husayn and took to himself the latter's wives, one of whom being Saray Mulk Khanum. Saray was five years younger than Timur and was said to be very beautiful, sometimes described as possessing "surpassing" beauty. She was a direct descendant of Genghis Khan, the Great Khan (Emperor) and founder of the Mongol Empire, which gave Timur added legitimity when he made her his empress consort.

== Sources ==
- This article incorporates text from a publication now in the public domain: Goldsmid, Frederic John (1911). "Timūr". In Chisholm, Hugh (ed.). Encyclopædia Britannica. Vol. 26 (11th ed.). Cambridge University Press. pp. 994–995.
- Grousset, René (1970). The Empire of the Steppes: A History of Central Asia. New Brunswick, NJ: Rutgers University Press. ISBN 978-0-8135-1304-1.
- Marozzi, Justin (2004). Tamerlane: Sword of Islam, Conqueror of the World. Da Capo Press. ISBN 978-0-306-81465-5.
- Marozzi, Justin. "Tamerlane", in: The Art of War: great commanders of the ancient and medieval world, Andrew Roberts (editor), London, England: Quercus Military History, 2008. ISBN 978-1847242594.
