= Turco-Persian tradition =

Distinctive culture in West Asia

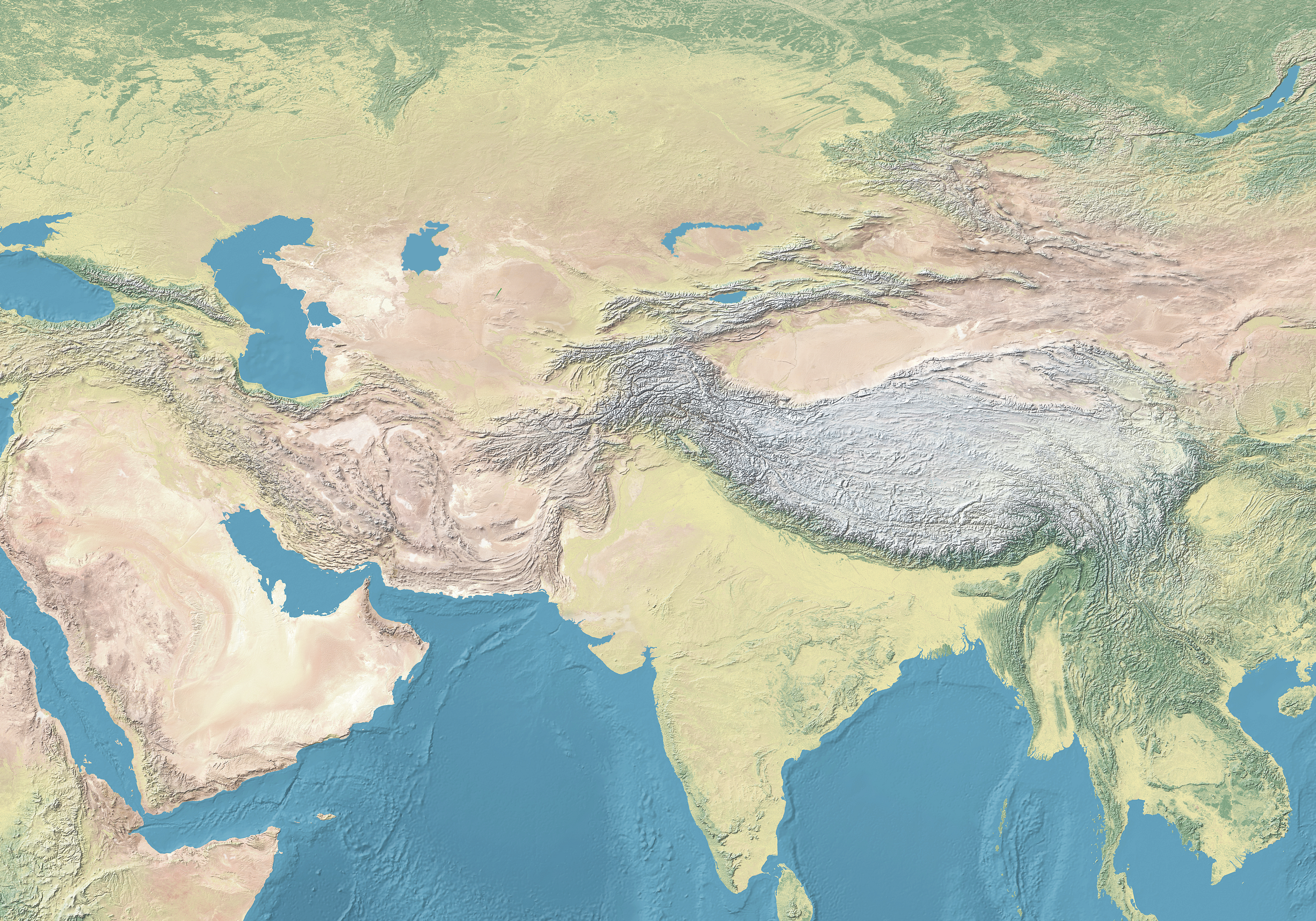
Main polities in Central Asia and South Asia c. 1000

The composite Turko-Persian, Turco-Persian, or Turco-Iranian (Persian: فرهنگ ایرانی-ترکی) is the distinctive culture that arose in the 9th and 10th centuries AD in Khorasan and Transoxiana (present-day Afghanistan, Iran, Uzbekistan, Turkmenistan, Tajikistan and minor parts of Kyrgyzstan and Kazakhstan). According to the modern historian Robert L. Canfield, the Turco-Persian tradition was Persianate in that it was centered on a lettered tradition of Iranian origin; it was Turkic insofar as it was for many generations patronized by Turkic rulers; and it was "Islamicate" in that Islamic notions of virtue, permanence, and excellence infused discourse about public issues as well as the religious affairs of the Muslims, who were the presiding elite."

In subsequent centuries, the Turco-Persian culture was carried on further by conquering peoples, mainly the two key Turkic groups Oghuz and Karluk tribes, to neighbouring regions, eventually becoming the predominant culture of the ruling and elite classes of South Asia (where it evolved into Indo-Persian tradition), Central Asia and the Tarim Basin, as well as large parts of West Asia.

== Origins ==
Turkic-Persian tradition was a variant of Islamic culture. Islamic notions of virtue, permanence, and excellence permeated discussions on public issues and the religious affairs of the presiding Muslim elite.

After the Muslim conquest of Persia, Middle Persian, the language of Sassanids, continued in wide use well into the second Islamic century (eighth century) as a medium of administration in the eastern lands of the Caliphate.

Politically, the Abbasids soon started losing their control, causing two major lasting consequences. First, the Abbasid Caliph al-Mutasim (833–842) greatly increased the presence of Turkic mercenaries and Mamluk slaves in the Caliphate, and they eventually displaced Arabs and Persians from the military, and therefore from the political hegemony, starting an era of Turco-Persian symbiosis.

Second, the governors in Khurasan, Tahirids, were factually independent; then the Saffarids from Sistan freed the eastern lands, but were replaced by independent Samanids, although they showed perfunctory deference to the Caliph.

=== Language ===
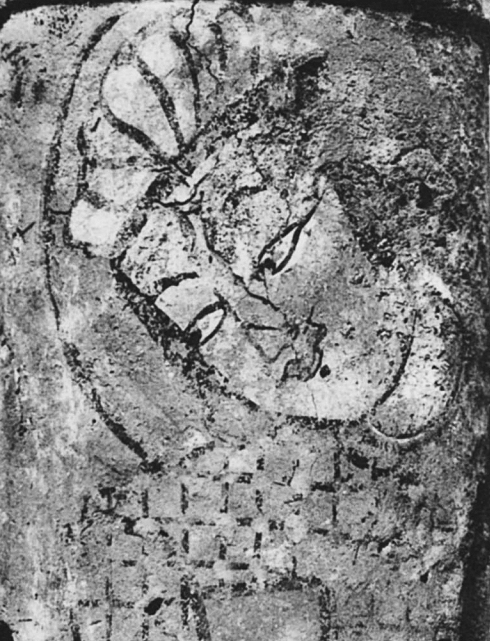
Ghaznavid portrait, Palace of Lashkari Bazar. Schlumberger noted that the turban, the small mouth and the strongly slanted eyes were characteristically Turkic.

Middle Persian was a lingua franca of the region before the Islamic invasion, but afterwards Arabic became a preferred medium of literary expression.

In the ninth century a new Persian language emerged as the idiom of administration and literature. Tahirids and Saffarids continued using Persian as an informal language, although for them Arabic was the "only proper language for recording anything worthwhile, from poetry to science", but the Samanids made Persian a language of learning and formal discourse. The language that appeared in the ninth and tenth centuries was a new form of Persian, based on the Middle Persian of pre-Islamic times.

The Samanids began recording their court affairs in Persian, and they used it as the main public idiom. The earliest great poetry in New Persian was written for the Samanid court. Samanids encouraged translation of religious works from Persian into Arabic. Even the learned authorities of Islam, the ulama, began using the Persian lingua franca in public, although they still used Arabic as a medium of scholarship. The crowning literary achievement in the early New Persian language, the Book of Kings of Ferdowsi, presented to the court of Mahmud of Ghazni (998–1030), was more than a literary achievement; it was a kind of Iranian nationalistic memoir, Ferdowsi galvanized Persian nationalistic sentiments by invoking pre-Islamic Persian heroic imagery. Ferdowsi enshrined in literary form the most treasured stories of popular folk-memory.

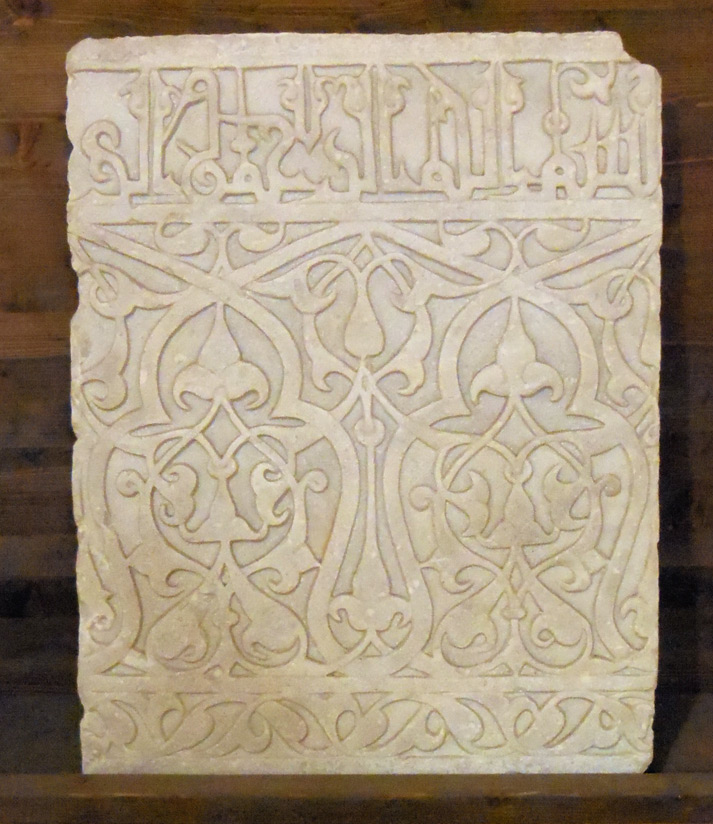
Marble wall border, Palace of Sultan Mas'ud III, Ghazni, Afghanistan, 12th century.

Before the Ghaznavids broke away, the Samanid rulership was internally falling to its Turkic servants. The Samanids had their own guard of Turkic Mamluk mercenaries (the ghilman), who were headed by a chamberlain, and a Persian and Arabic speaking bureaucracy, headed by a Persian vizier. The army was largely composed of mostly Turkic Mamluks. By the latter part of the tenth century, Samanid rulers gave the command of their army to Turkic generals.

These generals eventually had effective control over all Samanid affairs. The rise of Turks in Samanid times brought a loss of Samanid southern territories to one of their Mamluks, who were governing on their behalf. Mahmud of Ghazni ruled over southeastern extremities of Samanid territories from the city of Ghazni. Turkic political ascendancy in the Samanid period in the tenth and eleventh centuries resulted in the fall of Samanid ruling institution to its Turkic generals; and in a rise of Turkic pastoralists in the countryside.

The Ghaznavids (989–1149) founded an empire which became the most powerful in the east since the Abbasid Caliphs at their peak, and their capital at Ghazni became second only to Baghdad in cultural elegance. It attracted many scholars and artists of the Islamic world. Turkic ascendance to power in the Samanid court brought Turks as the main patrons of Persianate culture, and as they subjugated Western and Southern Asia, they brought along this culture.

The Kara-Khanid Khanate (999–1140) at that time were gaining pre-eminence over the countryside. The Kara-Khanids were pastoralists of noble Turkic backgrounds, and they cherished their Turkic ways. As they gained strength they fostered development of a new Turkic literature which was entirely based on the Persian literature that had arisen earlier.

== Historical outline ==
=== Early Turkic-Iranian interactions ===
Peter B. Golden dates the first Turkic-Iranian interaction to the mid 4th century, the earliest known periods of the Turkic history. The origins of the First Turkic Khaganate is associated with Iranian elements. The Sogdian influence on the state was considerable. The Sogdians, international merchants of long standing with numerous trading colonies along the silk route, needed the military power of the Turks. Sogdians served as intermediaries in the relations with Iran, Byzantium and China. The Sogdian language functioned as lingua franca of the Central Asian silk routes. The Uyghur Khaganate that succeeded the Turkic Empire was even more closesly associated with Sogdian elements. After the fall of the Uyghur nomadic state, many Turkic peoples moved to Turkestan, then a predominantly Iranian and Tokharian region, which became increasingly Turkicized.

=== Beginning of the Turco-Persian symbiosis ===
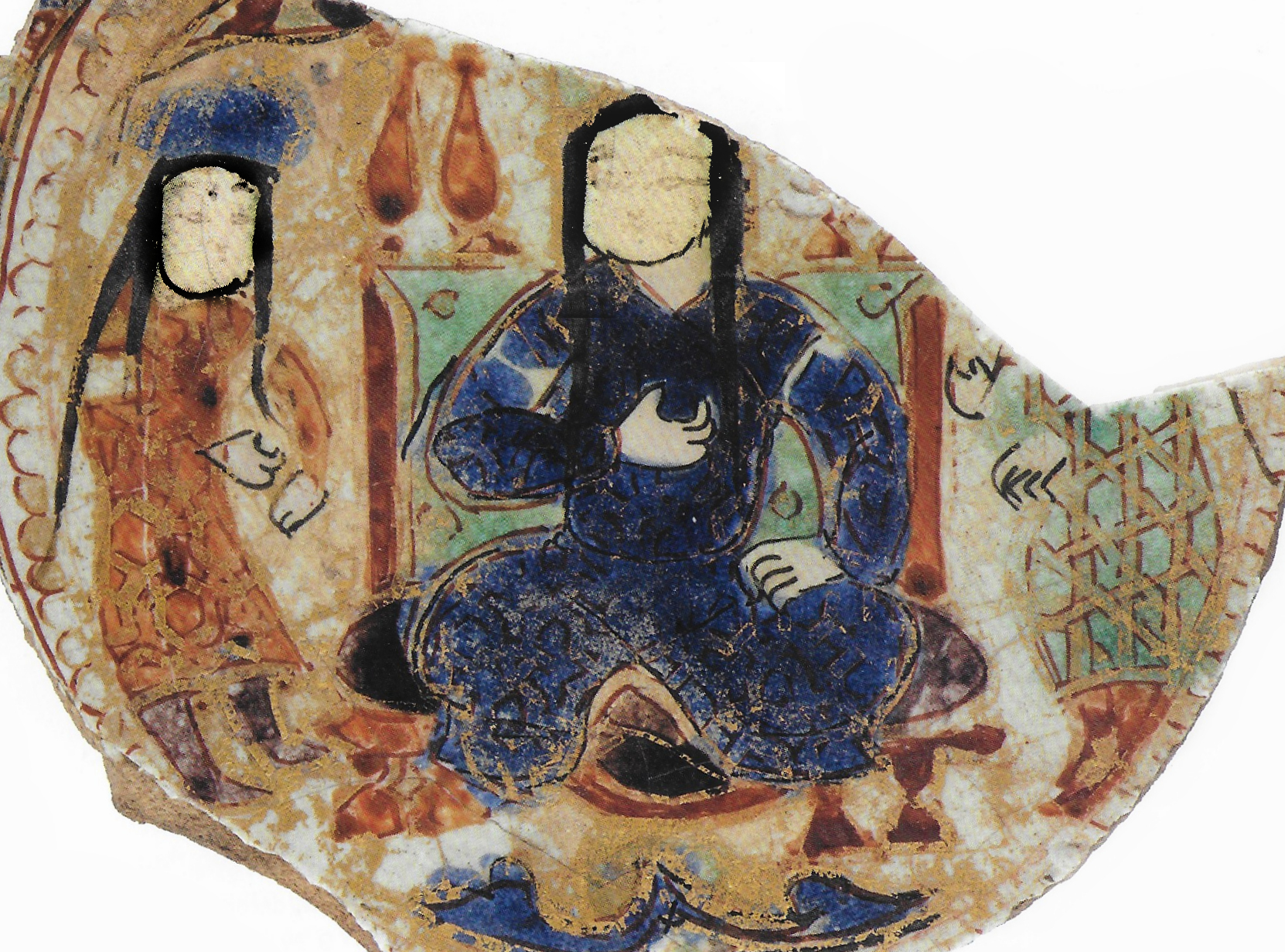
Prince on his throne, with standing courtesans, Afrasiyab, Samarkand, dated 1170–1220. National History Museum of Samarkand.

In Samanid times began the growth of the public influence of the ulama, the learned scholars of Islam. Ulama grew in prominence as the Samanids gave special support to Sunnism, in contrast with their Shiite neighbors, the Buyids. They enjoyed strong position in the city of Bukhara, and it grew under the Samanids' successors Kara-Khanid Khanate. Kara-Khanids established a dominance of ulama in the cities, and the network of recognized Islamic authorities became an alternative social instrument for the maintenance of public order. In the Kara-Khanid Khanate formed an ethnically and dogmatically diverse society. The eastern lands of the Caliphate were ethnically and religiously very diverse. Christians, Jews, and Zoroastrians were numerous, and also several minority Islamic sects had considerable following. These diverse peoples found refuge in the cities. Bukhara and Samarkand swelled and formed ethnic and sectarian neighborhoods, most of them surrounded by walls, each with its own markets, caravansaraies, and public squares. The religious authorities of these non-Muslim communities became their spokesmen, just as the ulama were for the Muslim community, they also began overseeing internal communal affairs. Thus, alongside the rise of the ulama, there was a corresponding rise in the political importance of the religious leaders of other doctrinal communities.

The ruling institution was dominated by Turks from various tribes, some highly urbanized and Persianized, while others remained rural and distinctly Turkic. It was managed by bureaucrats and ulama who used both Persian and Arabic. Its literati participated in the high cultural traditions of both the Arabic and Persian worlds within the broader Islamicate society. This composite culture was the beginning of the Turko-Persian variant of Islamicate culture. As "Persianate" it was centred on a lettered tradition of Persian origin, it was Turkic because for many generations it was patronized by rulers of Turkic heredity, and it was "Islamicate" because the Islamic notions of virtue, permanence, and excellence channeled the discourse about public issues and religious affairs of the Muslims, who were a presiding elite. The combination of these elements in the Islamic society had a strong impact on the religion, because Islam was disengaged from its Arabic background and Bedouin traditions and became a far richer, more adaptable, and universal culture. The appearance of New Persian, ascendancy of Turks to power in place of the Persian Samanids, rise of the non-Arabic ulama in the cities, and development of ethnically and confessionally complex urban society marked an emergence of a new Turco-Persian Islamic culture. As the Turco-Persian Islamic culture was exported into the wider region of Western and Southern Asia, the transformation became increasingly evident.

The early stages of Turco-Persian cultural synthesis in the Islamic world are marked by cultural, social and political tensions and competition among Turks, Persians, and Arabs, despite the egalitarianism of Islamic doctrine. The complex ideas around non-Arabs in the Muslim world lead to debates and changing attitudes that can be seen in numerous Arabic, Persian and Turkic writings before the Mongol expansion.

The Perso-Islamic tradition was a tradition where the Turkic groups played an important role in its military and political success while the culture raised both by and under the influence of Muslims used Persian as its cultural vehicle. In short, the Turco-Persian tradition features Persian culture patronized by Turcophone rulers.

=== Spread of Turco-Persian tradition ===
The Turco-Persian Islamic culture that emerged under the Persianate Samanids, Ghaznavids, and Kara-Khanids was carried by succeeding dynasties into Western and Southern Asia, in particular, by the Seljuks (1040–1118), and their successor states, who presided over Persia, Syria, and Anatolia until the thirteenth century, and by the Ghaznavids, who in the same period dominated Greater Khorasan and most of present-day Pakistan. These two dynasties together drew the center of the Islamic world eastward. The institutions stabilized Islamic society into a form that would persist, at least in West Asia, until the twentieth century.

The Turco-Persian distinctive Islamic culture flourished for hundreds of years, and then faded under imposed modern European influences. Turco-Persian Islamic culture is a mix of Arabic, Persian, and Turkic elements blended in the ninth and tenth centuries into what eventually became a predominant culture of the ruling and elite classes of West, Central and South Asia.

The Ghaznavids moved their capital from Ghazni to Lahore, which they turned into another center of Islamic culture. Under Ghaznavids poets and scholars from Kashgar, Bukhara, Samarkand, Baghdad, Nishapur, and Ghazni congregated in Lahore. Thus, the Turco-Persian culture was brought deep into India and carried further in the thirteenth century.

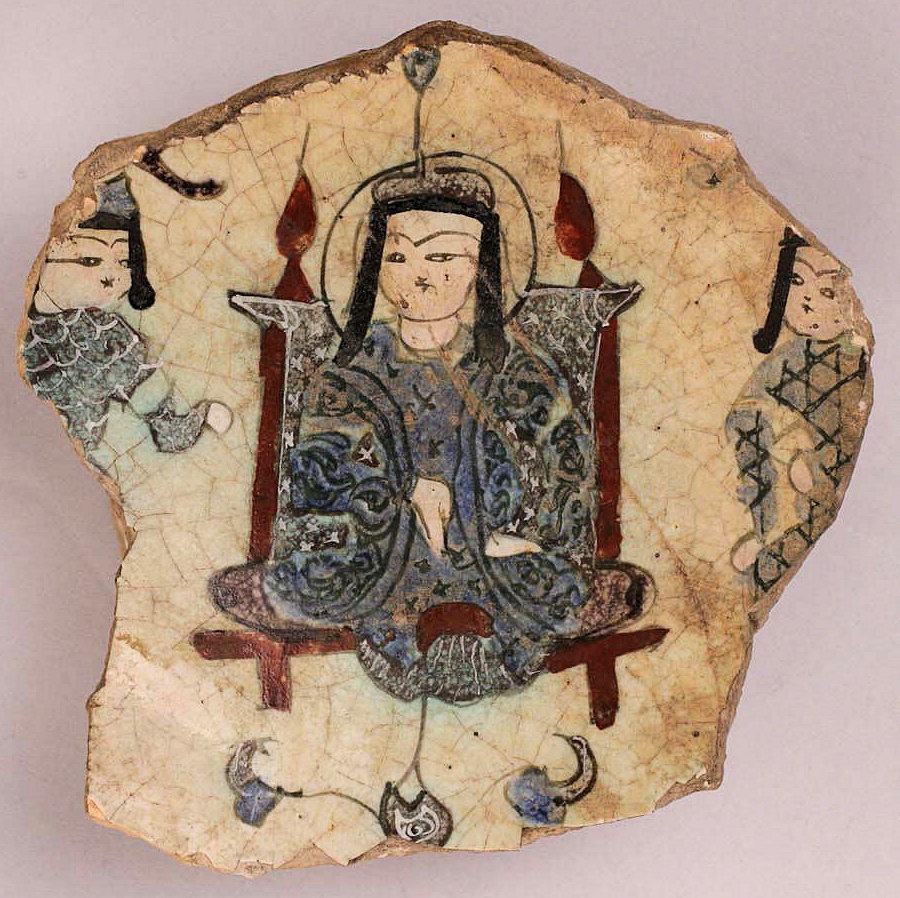
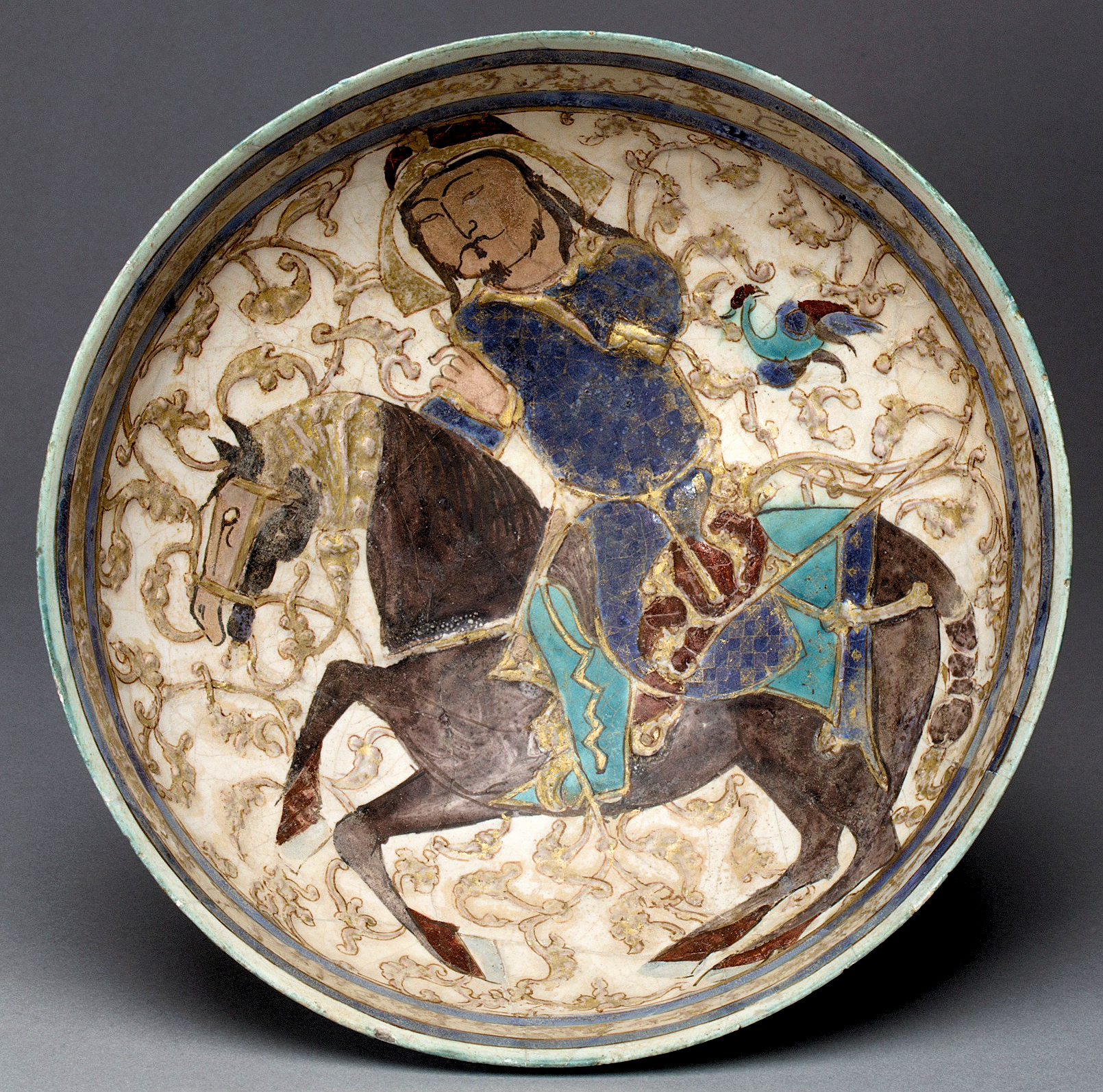
Mina'i bowls with enthroned figure (fragment) and prince on horseback. Seljuk period, 12th-early 13th century. Iran.

The Seljuq successors of Kara-Khanid Khanate in Transoxiana brought this culture westward into Persia, Iraq, and Syria. Seljuqs won a decisive battle with the Ghaznavids and then swept into Khorasan, they brought Turco-Persian Islamic culture westward into western Persia and Iraq. Persia and Central Asia became a heartland of Persianate language and culture. As Seljuks came to dominate Iraq, Syria, and Anatolia, they carried this Turco-Persian culture beyond, and made it the culture of their courts in the region to as far west as the Mediterranean Sea. The Seljuks subsequently gave rise to the Sultanate of Rum in Anatolia, while taking their thoroughly Persianised identity with them, giving it an even more profound and noted history there. Under Seljuks and the Ghaznavids the Islamic religious institutions became more organized and Sunni orthodoxy became more codified. The great jurist and theologian al-Ghazali proposed a synthesis of Sufism and sharia that became a basis of a richer Islamic theology. Formulating the Sunni concept of division between temporal and religious authorities, he provided a theological basis for the existence of Sultanate, a temporal office alongside the Caliphate, which by that time was merely a religious office. The main institutional means of establishing a consensus of the ulama on these dogmatic issues were the madrasas, formal Islamic schools that granted licensure to teach. First established under Seljuqs, these schools became means of uniting Sunni ulama which legitimized the rule of the Sultans. The bureaucracies were staffed by graduates of the madrasas, so both the ulama and the bureaucracies were under the influence of esteemed professors at the madrasas.

The period from the eleventh to thirteenth century was a cultural blossom time in Western and Southern Asia. A shared culture spread from Mediterranean to the mouth of Ganges, despite political fragmentation and ethnic diversity.

=== Through the centuries ===
The culture of the Turco-Persian world in the thirteenth, fourteenth, and fifteenth centuries was tested by invading armies of inland Asia. The Mongols under Genghis Khan (1220–58), Chagatai Khan (1227–1462) and Timur (Tamerlane, 1336–1405) stimulated development of Persianate culture of Central and West Asia, because of the new concentrations of specialists of high culture created by the invasions, for many people had to seek refuge in few safe havens, primarily India, where scholars, poets, musicians, and fine artisans intermingled and cross-fertilized, and because the broad peace secured by the huge imperial systems established by the Il-Khans (in the thirteenth century) and Timurids (in the fifteenth century), when travel was safe, and scholars and artists, ideas and skills, and fine books and artifacts circulated freely over a wide area. Il-Khans and Timurids deliberately patronized Persianate high culture. Under their rule developed new styles of architecture, Persian literature was encouraged, and flourished miniature painting and book production, and under Timurids prospered Turkic poetry, based on the vernacular known as Chaghatai (today called Uzbek and Uyghur; of Turkic Qarluq origin). Moghulistan, a breakaway entity of the same Chagatai Khanate, initially preserved its Mongol origin, but ultimately, the state was also Turco-Persianised and Islamised, and became Islamicate as well; subsequent states like Turpan Khanate and Yarkent Khanate followed the same Turco-Persian traditions.

Inscription of Ibrahim Sultan, a Timurid prince, at the Tachara Palace in Persepolis, dated to 826 AH (1422–1423 CE), featuring verses from Saadi’s Bustan.

The historian Peter Jackson explains in The New Cambridge History of Islam: "The elite of the early Delhi sultanate comprised overwhelmingly first generation immigrants from Persia and Central Asia: Persians ('Tājīks'), Turks, Ghūrīs and also Khalaj from the hot regions (garmsīr) of modern Afghanistan. The Alai era saw the overthrow of the old nobility of early Mamluk rule. The backbone of the Turkic elite was broken as their wealth in Delhi was confiscated by Nusrat Khan Jalesari, after which a new heterogeneous Indo-Muslim nobility emerged in the Delhi Sultanate. After the sack of Baghdad by the Mongols in 1258, Delhi became the most important cultural center of the Muslim east. The Delhi Sultans modeled their life-styles after the Turkic and Persian upper classes, who now predominated in most of West and Central Asia. They patronized literature and music, but became especially notable for their architecture, because their builders drew from Muslim world architecture to produce a profusion of mosques, palaces, and tombs unmatched in any other Islamic country. Many dynasties of the Delhi Sultanates were Turko-Afghan in origin.

In Mongol-Chagataid and Timurid times the predominant influences on Turco-Persian culture were imposed from Central Asia, and in this period Turco-Persian culture became sharply distinguishable from the Arabic Islamic world to the west, the dividing zone fell along Euphrates. Socially, the Turco-Persian world was marked by a system of ethnologically defined elite statuses: the rulers and their soldiery were Turkic or Turkic-speaking Mongols; the administrative cadres and literati were Persian. Cultural affairs were marked by characteristic pattern of language use: New Persian was the language of state affairs and literature; New Persian and Arabic the languages of scholarship; Arabic the language of adjudication; and Turkic the language of the military.

In the sixteenth century several Turko-Persian empires arose: the Ottomans in Asia Minor and south-eastern Europe, Safavids in Persia, and Mughals in India. Thus, from the sixteenth to the eighteenth centuries the territories from south-eastern Europe, the Caucasus, Asia Minor to East Bengal were dominated by Turco-Persian dynasties.

At the beginning of the fourteenth century the Ottomans rose to predominance in Asia Minor, and developed an empire that subjugated most of the Arab Islamic world as well as south-eastern Europe. The Ottomans patronized Persian literature for five and a half centuries and, because Asia Minor was more stable than eastern territories, they attracted great numbers of writers and artists, especially in the sixteenth century. The Ottomans developed distinctive styles of arts and letters. Unlike Persia they gradually shed some of their Persianate qualities. They gave up Persian as the court language, using Turkish instead; a decision that shocked the highly Persianized Mughals in India.

The Safavids of the fifteenth century were leaders of a Sufi order, venerated by Turkmen tribesmen in eastern Anatolia. They patronized Persian culture in the manner of their predecessors. Safavids erected grand mosques and built elegant gardens, collected books (one Safavid ruler had a library of 3,000 volumes) and patronized whole academies. The Safavids introduced Shiism into Persia to distinguish Persian society from the Ottoman, their Sunni rivals to the west.

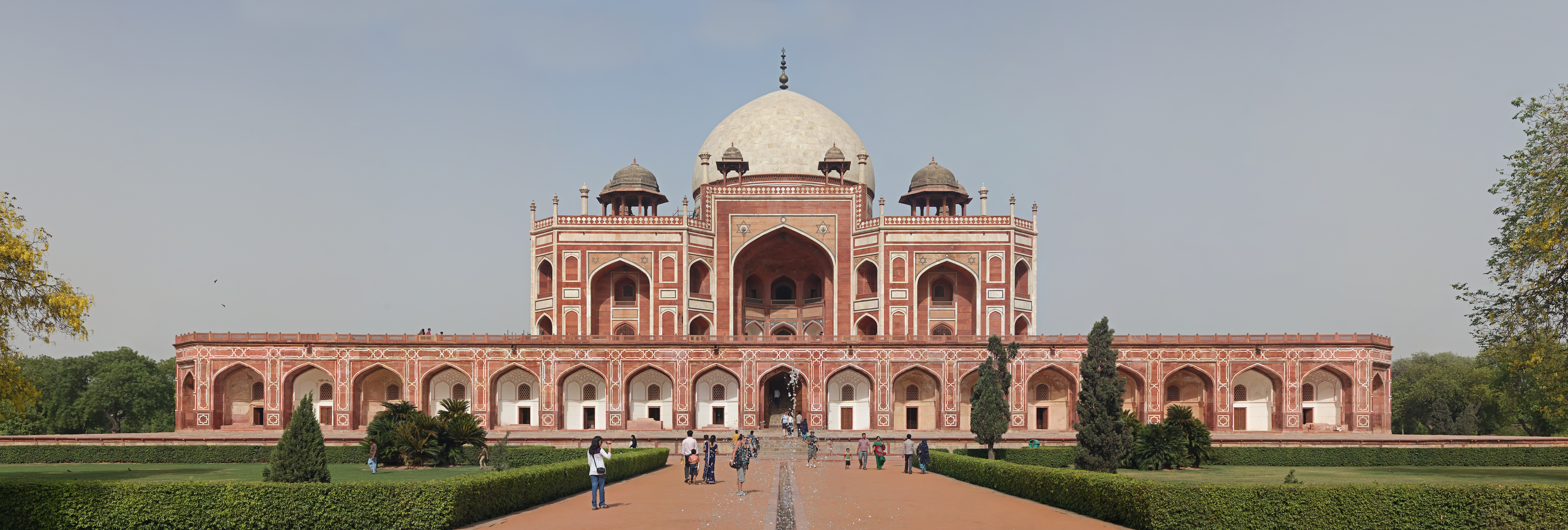
Tomb of Humayun shares similar patterns with Taj Mahal

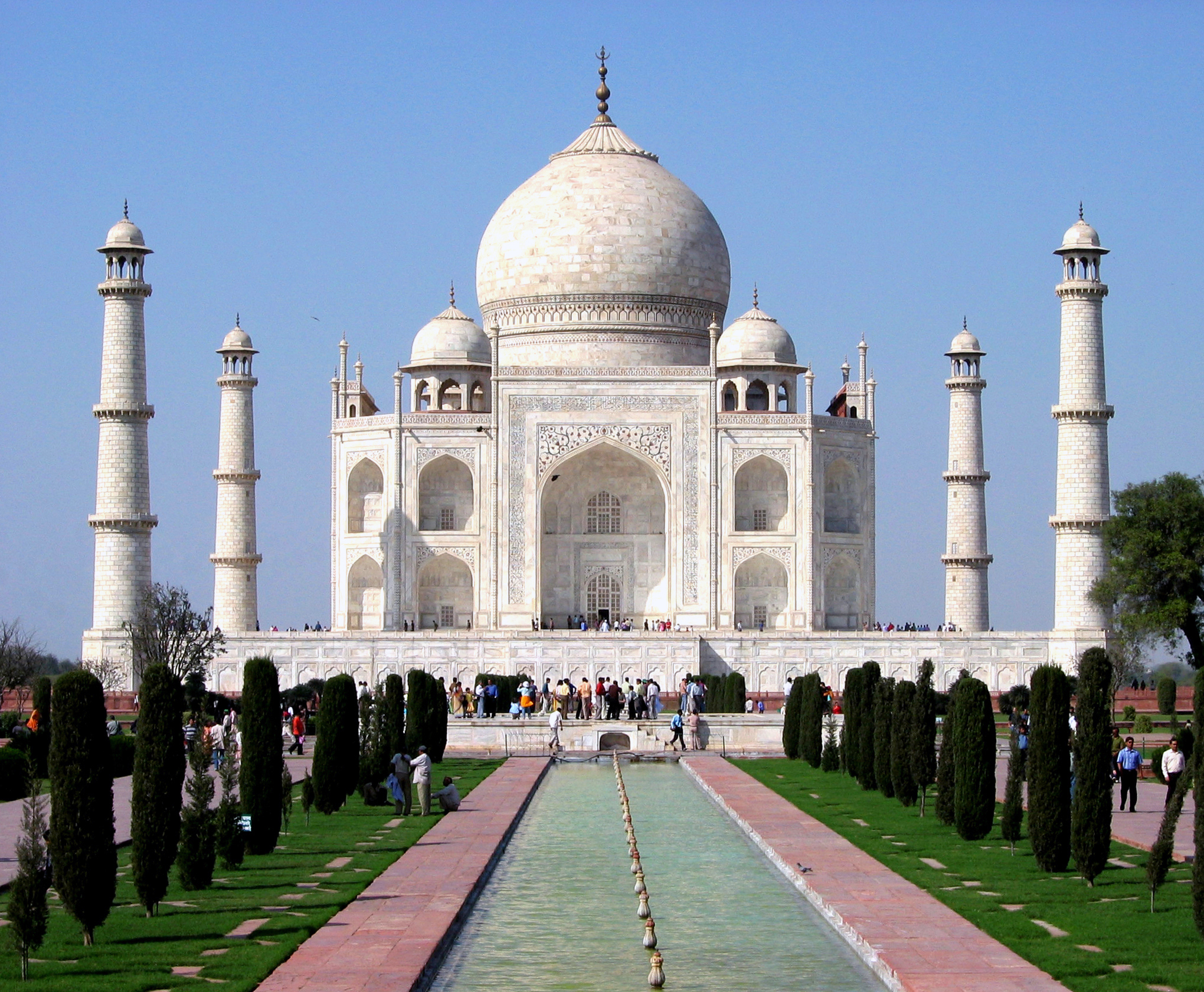
Taj Mahal

The Mughals, Persianized Chagataid Turks who had invaded India from Central Asia and claimed descent from both Timur and Genghis Khan, strengthened the Persianate culture of Muslim India. They cultivated art, enticing to their courts artists and architects from Bukhara, Tabriz, Shiraz, and other cities of Islamic world. The Taj Mahal was commissioned by the Mughal emperor Shah Jahan. The Mughals dominated India from 1526 until the eighteenth century, when Muslim successor states and non-Muslim powers of Sikh, Maratha, and British replaced them.

The Shaybanids, also known as Uzbeks, were led by Muhammad Shaybani, and originally traced origin from the Kipchak people that had expelled the Timurids from Central Asia to gain control of Transoxiana. Once the Shaybanids came to dominate the region and founded the Khanate of Bukhara, they underwent massive Karlukification of their culture; by the 17th century, most Shaybanid Uzbeks and their descendant khanates (now known as Janids) were entirely assimilated to Karluk frameworks and reconciled with the Timurid dynasty in India by proclaiming themselves heirs and protectors of Timurid heritages, thus continuing the Turco-Persian tradition of Central Asia.

The Ottoman, Safavid, Uzbek, Moghulistan Uyghur, and Mughal empires developed variations of a broadly similar Turco-Persian tradition. A remarkable similarity in culture, particularly among the elite classes, spread across territories of West, Central and South Asia. Although populations across this vast region had conflicting allegiances (sectarian, locality, tribal, and ethnic affiliation) and spoke many different languages (mostly Indo-Iranian languages like Persian, Urdu, Hindi, Punjabi, Pashto, Baluchi, or Kurdish; Dravidian languages like Tamil and Malayalam; or Turkic languages like Turkish, Azerbaijani, Kazakh, Turkmen, Uzbek, Uyghur or Kyrgyz), people shared a number of common institutions, arts, knowledge, customs, and rituals. These cultural similarities were perpetuated by poets, artists, architects, artisans, jurists, and scholars, who maintained relations among their peers in the far-flung cities of the Turco-Persian world, from Istanbul, Tashkent, Samarkand, Baku, Kashgar, Tabriz, Khiva, Isfahan, Bukhara, Bursa, to Mumbai, Kolkata, Karachi, Herat, Kabul, and Delhi.

As the broad cultural region remained politically divided, the sharp antagonisms between empires stimulated appearance of variations of Turco-Persian culture. The main reason for this was Safavids' introduction of Shiism into Persia, done to distinguish themselves from their Sunni neighbors, especially Ottomans. After 1500, the Persian culture developed distinct features of its own, and interposition of strong Shiite culture hampered exchanges with Sunni peoples on Persia's western and eastern frontiers. The Sunni peoples of eastern Mediterranean in Asia Minor, Syria, Iraq, Egypt, and Sunnis of Central Asia and India developed somewhat independently. Ottoman Turkey grew more like its Arab Muslim neighbors in West Asia; India developed a South Asian style of Indo-Persian culture; and Central Asia, which gradually grew more isolated, changed relatively little.

=== Disintegration ===
Two pages from a manuscript of the Divan of Fath-Ali Shah, the second monarch of Qajar Iran, containing three ghazals in Persian and one ghazal in Azerbaijani Turkic (center of the left page).

In the seventeenth and eighteenth centuries the Turco-Persian empires weakened by the Europeans' discovery of a sea route to India, and introduction of hand guns, which gave the horsemen of the pastoral societies greater fighting capability. In India, the Mughal Empire decayed into warring states. The European powers encroached into the Turco-Persian region, contributing to the political fragmentation of the region. By the nineteenth century, the European secular concepts of social obligation and authority, along with superior technology, shook many established institutions of Turco-Persia.

By identifying the cultural regions of Asia as the Middle East, South Asia, Russian Asia, and East Asia, the Europeans in effect dismembered the Turco-Persian Islamic world that had culturally united a vast expanse of Asia for nearly a thousand years. The imposition of European influences on Asia greatly affected political and economic affairs throughout the region where Persianate culture had once been patronized by Turkic rulers. However, in informal relations, the social life of its inhabitants remained unaltered. Popular customs and ideologies of virtue, sublimity, and permanence, ideas that were entailed in Islamic religious teaching, persisted relatively unchanged.

=== Present ===
The twentieth century saw many changes in inland Asia that further exposed contradictory cultural trends in the region. Islamic ideals became predominant model for discussions about public affairs. The new rhetoric of public ideals captured interest of peoples throughout Islamic world, including the area where in public affairs Turco-Persian culture once was prominent. The Islamic moral imagery that survived in informal relations emerged as the model of ideology expressed in its most political form in the Islamic revolution of Iran and in the Islamic idealism of the Afghanistan mujahedin resistance movement.

The Islamic resurgence has been less a renewal of faith and dedication than a public resurfacing of perspectives and ideals previously relegated to less public, informal relations under the impact of European secular influences. They are not medieval Islamic ideals, but important ideological traditions that survived an era of great change, and now are used to interpret the problems of contemporary times. The Turco-Persian Islamic tradition provided the elements they have used to express their shared concerns.

== List of Turko-Persian states and dynasties ==
=== Greater Iran ===
Name	Years	Map	Notes
Ghaznavids	977–1186		Culturally Persianate empire of Turkic origin, see State and culture of Ghaznavids.; They claimed ancestry from Yazdgerd III (r. 632–651), the last Sasanian ruler.
Seljuk Empire	1037–1194		Culturally Persianate empire of Oghuz Turkic origin, see Culture and language of Seljuk Empire.
Khwarazmian Empire	1077–1231		Culturally Persianate, Sunni Muslim empire of Turkic mamluk origin.
Timurid Empire	1370–1507		Culturally Persianate empire of Turco-Mongol origin, see Culture of Timurid Empire.
Qara Qoyunlu	1374–1468		Culturally Persianate tribal confederation of Turkoman (Oghuz Turkic) origin, see also Governance and Culture of Qara Qoyunlu.
Aq Qoyunlu	1378–1508		Culturally Persianate tribal confederation of Turkoman (Oghuz Turkic) origin, see also Governance and Culture of Aq Qoyunlu.
Safavids	1501–1736		Culturally Persianate tribal confederation of Turkoman (Oghuz Turkic) origin.

=== Central and South Asia ===
Name	Years	Map	Notes
Kara-Khanid Khanate	840–1212		The first Turkic entity established by Karluk Turks, it was also the first to adopt Islam among Turkic people, ultimately paved way for the emergence of Turco-Persian culture.
Chagatai Khanate	1227–1462		Originally a sub-division of the Mongol Empire, it later underwent assimilation to Karluk Turkic society, and moved away from tribal politics to become the Persianate regime of Central Asia.
Moghulistan	1347–1660s		A breakaway entity of the Chagatai Khanate of Turco-Mongol origin, but culturally Persianate. Its breakaway entities, Turpan Khanate and Yarkent Khanate, had continued the Turco-Persian tradition.
Khanate of Bukhara	1501–1785		Originally the Kipchak Turkic people of Uzbek Khanate under the Shaybanids and Janids, later underwent assimilation to Karluk Turkic society, and moved away from tribal politics to become the Persianate regime of Central Asia; its spin-off Khanate of Khiva and Khanate of Kokand, both of the same Karlukified Uzbeks, ultimately followed the same pattern.
Qutb Shahi dynasty	1518–1687		Culturally Persianate dynasty of Turkoman (Oghuz Turkic) origin, see Culture of Qutb Shahi dynasty.
Mughal Empire	1526–1857		Culturally Persianate empire of Turco-Mongol origin.

=== Anatolia and Balkans ===
Name	Years	Map	Notes
Sultanate of Rûm	1077–1308		Culturally Persianate sultanate of Oghuz Turkic origin, see Culture and society of Sultanate of Rûm.
Ottoman Empire	1299–1923		Culturally Persianate sultanate of Oghuz Turkic origin.

== See also ==
- 16 Great Turkic Empires
- Chagatai language
- Culture of the Ottoman Empire
- Greater Iran
- Hazaras
- Indo-Persian culture
- Iranian peoples
- Islam in Iran
- Ottoman Turkish
- Persianate society
- Persianization
- Turco-Mongol tradition
- Turkic peoples
- Turkification
- Uzbekisation

== Bibliography ==
- Subtelny, Maria E. (2007). Timurids in Transition: Turko-Persian Politics and Acculturation in Medieval Iran. Brill.
