= Turpan Khanate =

Historic state ruled by the Mongols

- 1487–1660?
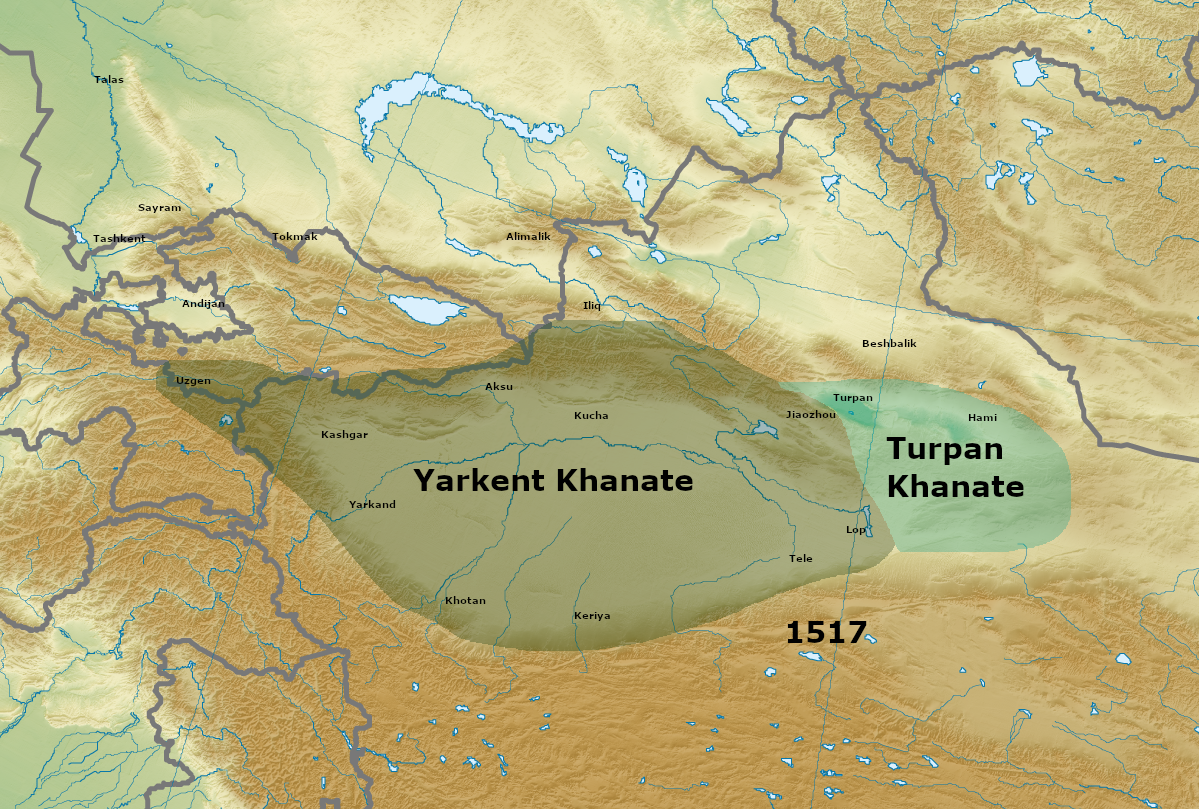
- Yarkent and Turpan khanates in 1517
- Capital: Turpan
- Common languages: Turki (Chagatai language)
- Religion: Sunni Islam
- Government: Monarchy
- Khan
  - 1487-1504 (first): Ahmad Alaq
  - 1570 (last): Muhammad Khan ibn Mansur Khan
- History
  - Established: 1487
  - Disestablished: 1660?
Preceded by	Succeeded by
Moghulistan	Yarkent Khanate
- Today part of: China

The Turpan Khanate (Chinese: 吐魯番汗國), also known as the Eastern Moghulistan, Kingdom of Uyghurstan or Turfan Khanate, was a Sunni Muslim Turco-Mongol khanate ruled by the descendants of Chagatai Khan. It was founded by Ahmad Alaq in 1487 based in Turpan as the eastern division of Moghulistan, itself an eastern offshoot of the Chagatai Khanate.

Most territories of the Turpan Khanate were conquered by the Yarkent Khanate, the western offshoot of Moghulistan, in 1570.

== History ==
In 1487, Ahmad Alaq gained independence from his brother Mahmud, and ruled the northern part of the Tarim Basin from Turpan in the east (now Gaochang, Turpan in Xinjiang). Under Ahmad Araq and his eldest son Mansur, Turpan became more Muslim.

Ahmad Alaq made peace with the Ming China, which had been in conflict over the control of the Kara Del in Hami since the time of his father Yunus Khan, and exchanged envoys. In the early 1500s, Ahmad Alaq was defeated and killed in a battle against Muhammad Shaybani of the Khanate of Bukhara.

Mansur, who succeeded Ahmad Araq to the throne, occupied Turpan and Aksu. Mansur defeated his brother Sultan Said Khan who ruled the western Moghulistan and exiled him. Mansur fought again with the Ming dynasty over the Hami-based Kara Del kingdom, and Mansur conquered the kingdom and brought the region under his control in 1513. With the conquest Buddhists from the Hami area migrated to Ming-controlled territory, and Buddhists from areas west of Hami disappeared. Historian Mirza Muhammad Haidar Dughlat characterized Mansur's battle with the Ming dynasty over Hami as a "holy war".

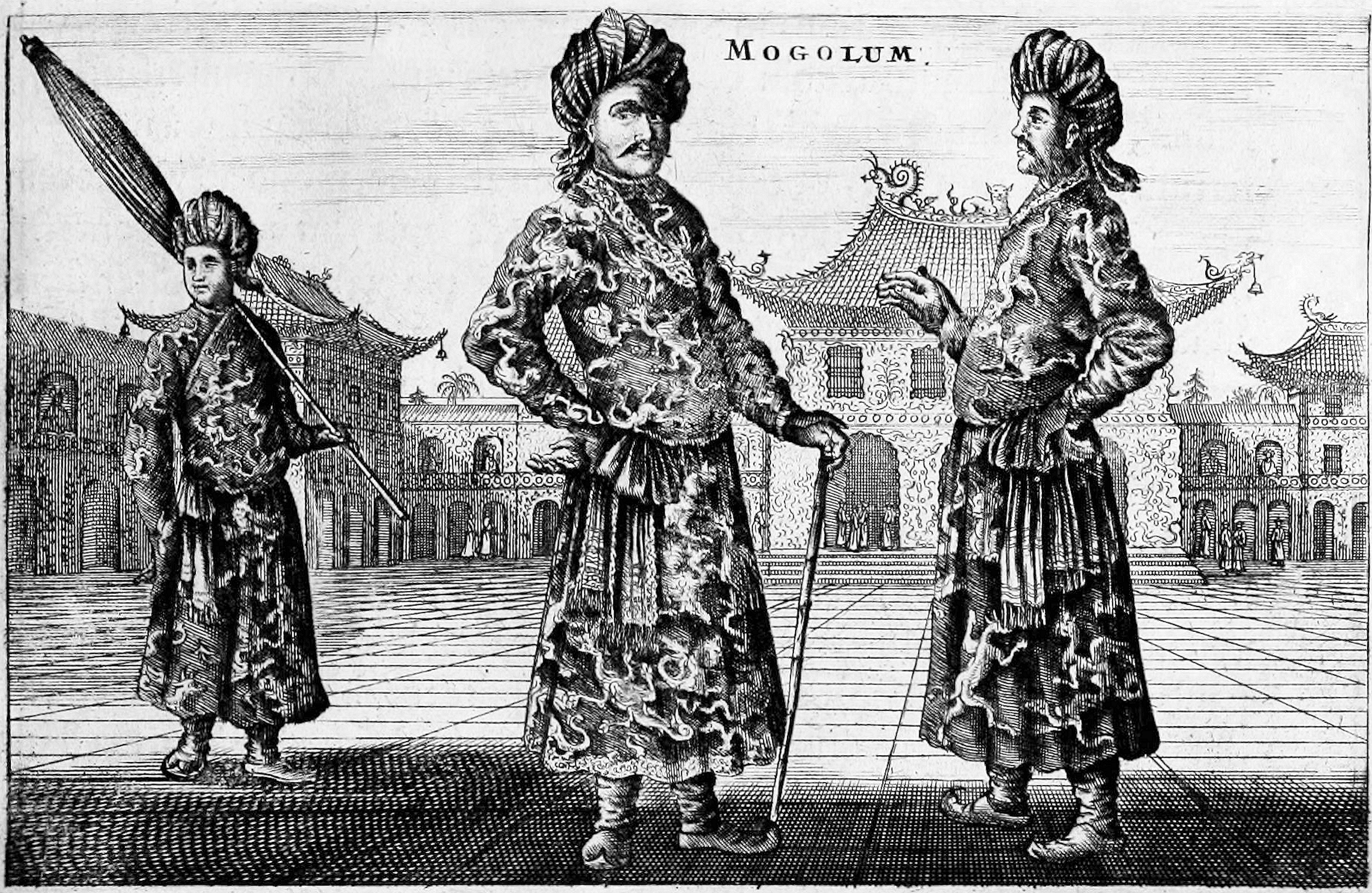
"Mughal embassy", seen by the Dutch visitors in Beijing in 1656. According to Lach & Kley (1993), modern historians (namely, Luciano Petech) think that the emissaries portrayed had come from Turpan, rather than all the way from the Moghul India.

While Mansur was fighting against Ming China, Sultan Said Khan was under the protection of his cousin, Babur of the Timurid dynasty, in Kabul. In response to Babur's capture of Samarkand, the Mir of Duglat captured the Ferghana Valley and presented it to Sultan Said Khan. Using this as a foothold, Sultan Said Khan returned to Moghulistan and defeated Mirza Abu Bakr Dughlat in Dughlat, and in 1514 declared himself Khan. There was also a faction in the Duglat division that opposed Abu Bakr, and Mirza Muhammad Haidar and others supported Sultan Said Khan.

At first, the brothers Mansur Khan and Sultan Said Khan were at odds, but eventually they reconciled, and the Khans of Moghulistan existed side by side in the east and west. Sultan Said attempted to advance into the steppe region to the west, but was blocked by the Uzbeks and Kazakhs, and ended up taking possession of the western Tarim Basin, centered on Kashgar and Yarkand. As a result, the government of Sultan Said Khan and his descendants came to be known as the Yarkent Khanate.

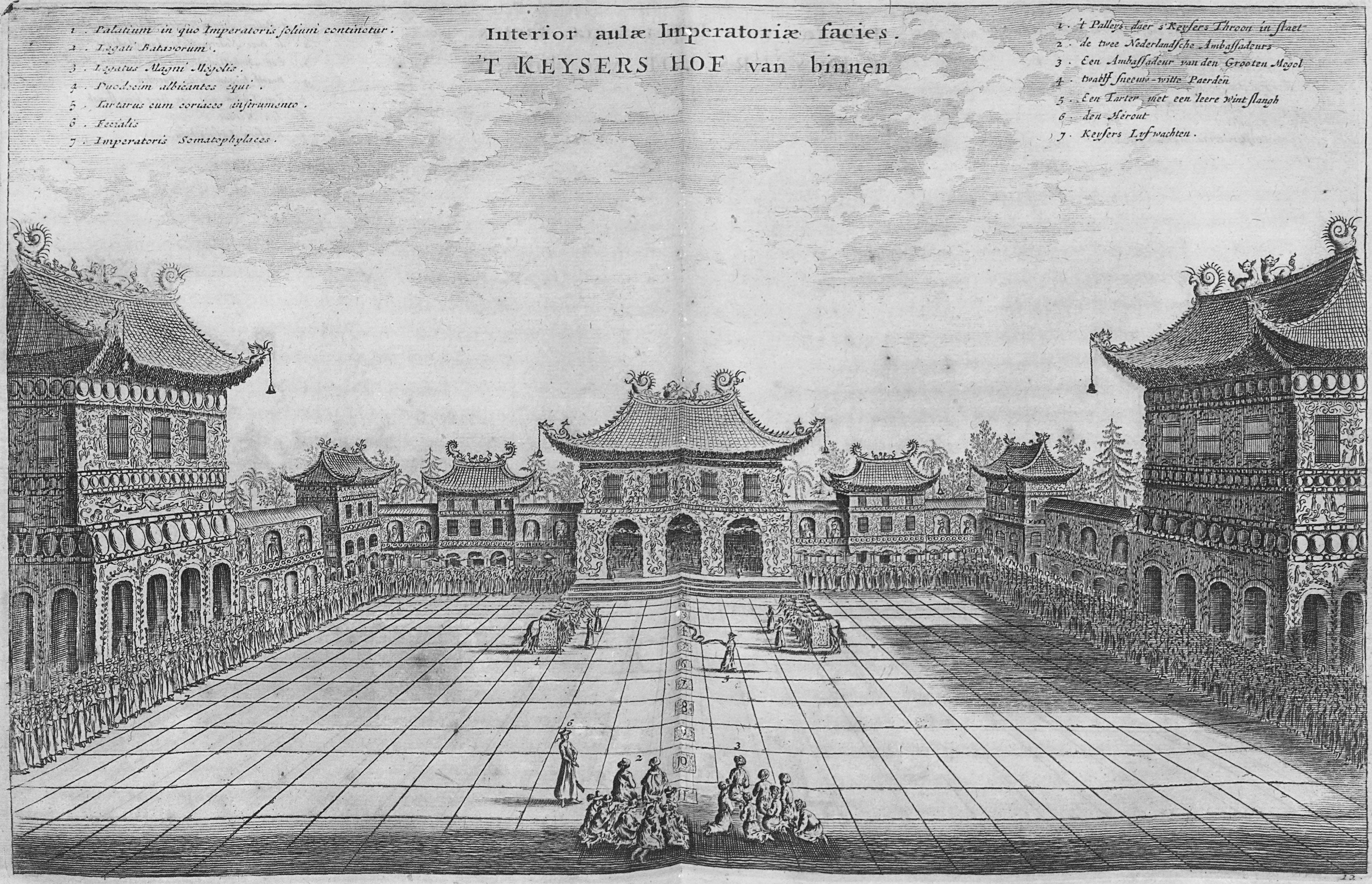
The presumed Turpan "Mughal embassy" (group "3") at the Chinese court in 1656, together with the embassy from Holand ("Batavorum", group "2").

From the 16th century onwards, the leaders of the Khojas came to have a strong influence, replacing the Dughlat faction, which had traditionally had a strong influence in Moghulistan.

The Turpan Khanate declined rapidly after Mansur's death under the reign of Shah Khan, and in 1570, the Turpan Khanate was invaded by an army led by Abduraim Sultan (brother of Abdul Karim Khan), the governor of Khotan in the Yarkand Khanate. The monarch, Muhammad Khan ibn Mansur Khan was captured and taken prisoner, and the Turpan Khanate faded from historical texts. Quraish, who had rebelled, was subdued by the army sent by Abdul Karim Khan, and Turpan came under the control of the Yarkand Khanate. The last thing heard of the Turpan Khanate were embassies sent from Turpan to Beijing in 1647 and 1657. The Qing dynasty of China regarded them as embassies from a genuine Chagatayid.

== List of rulers ==
#	Name	Reign
1	Ahmad Alaq	1487-1504
2	Mansur Khan	1503–1543
3	Barberchak	1543
4	Shah Khan	1545–1570
5	Muhammad Khan ibn Mansur Khan	1570

== See also ==
- List of Chagatai khans
- List of Mongol states

== Bibliography ==
- 江上波夫 (January 1987). 中央アジア史. 世界各国史. 山川出版社.
- 佐口透 (1962), "モグリスタン", アジア歴史事典, vol. 9, 平凡社
- 中見立夫; 濱田正美; 小松久男 (October 2000), "中央ユーラシアの周縁化", in 小松久男 (ed.), 中央ユーラシア史, 新版世界各国史, 山川出版社
- 濱田正美 (August 1998), "モグール・ウルスから新疆へ 東トルキスタンと明清王朝", 東アジア・ 東南アジア伝統社会の形成, 岩波講座13, 岩波書店
- 川口琢司 (April 2005), "チャガタイ・ウルス", 中央ユーラシアを知る事典, 平凡社
- 丸山鋼二 (2009-07-01). "新疆におけるイスラム教の定着 : 東チャガタイ汗国─ 新疆イスラム教小史③ ─". 文教大学国際学部紀要. 20 (1). 文教大学国際学部: 147–160. ISSN 0917-3072.
- 丸山鋼二 (2014-01-11). "ヤルカンド・ハン朝の建国と「聖戦」─ 新疆イスラム教小史⑦ ─". 文教大学国際学部紀要. 24 (2). 文教大学国際学部: 47–64. ISSN 0917-3072.
