= Mongolization =

Assimilation towards Mongolic culture

Mongolization or Mongolisation, is a cultural and language shift whereby populations adopt the Mongolic languages or culture. Kazakhs in Mongolia went through partial Mongolization.

Historically, groups such as Ongud, Keraites, Naimans and Merkits were Mongolized Turkic groups. Tanguts, who speak the Sino-Tibetan language but later became Mongolian, can be given as an example. Khotons are Mongolic but formerly were of Turkic ethnicity.

== Turkic people ==
=== Kipchaks ===
Kipchaks, the Turkic people inhabited in the vast Eurasian Steppe, were put under Mongol domination by Batu Khan, which he merged the majority of them into the Golden Horde, named after Jochi. Because of their steppe life, the Kipchaks were the most Mongolised people of the Turkic world, due to being too far away from many major Islamic centres. As for the result, despite later conversion to Islam, Kipchaks never shed away their Mongolian practises and became the strongest embodiment of Turco-Mongol people.

=== Karluks ===
The Karluks were the Turkic people that once dominated Central Asia with their sophisticated civilisations like Kara-Khanid Khanate and Khwarazmian Empire, before they were conquered by the Mongol Empire under the lead of Chagatai Khan, one of Genghis Khan's sons. Chagatai's reign marked the Mongolization of the Karluk Turkic people at some aspects, such as the development of Chagatai language and the fusion of Mongol to Turco-Persian framework and cultures.

On the other hand, however, the Mongolization of Karluks was not as strong as that of Kipchaks. The fact that Karluks had been able to develop a proper civilisation long before the Mongol conquest meant that Mongolization came via fusion instead; Timur, the conqueror of Central Asia and a Turco-Mongol, did proclaim himself heir of Genghis Khan via his marriage with a Genghisid woman; subsequently, the Timurid Empire and its Indian branch all styled themselves Mongol rulers, despite being deeply entrenched in Turco-Persian and Indian traditions. The same pattern exists among various Karluk or Karlukised entities like Khanate of Bukhara (under Shaybanids and Janids), Moghulistan, Yarkent Khanate and Altishahr, both acknowledged Mongolian heritage but rarely practised it in real life.

=== Oghuz ===
The Oghuz Turks were the least Mongolized of the Turkic world, mainly due to their resistance to Mongol rule since the Mongol invasion of the Khwarazmian Empire. Nonetheless, there were indirect influence from the Mongols during the Ilkhanate and later Timurid Empire.

== See also ==
- Russification
- Uzbekisation
- De-Sinicization
- Sinicization
- Turkification
- Turco-Mongol tradition
- Anti-Mongolianism
