= Nugandaširi =

Nugandaširi (Chinese: 努溫答失里) (fl. 1467) was a queen of Kara Del in modern-day Xinjiang. She ruled Kara Del as queen mother in 1460–1467. She was the only female ruler of the Kara Del.
