= Chaghatays =

Turco-Mongol ethnocultural group

چاغاتاي
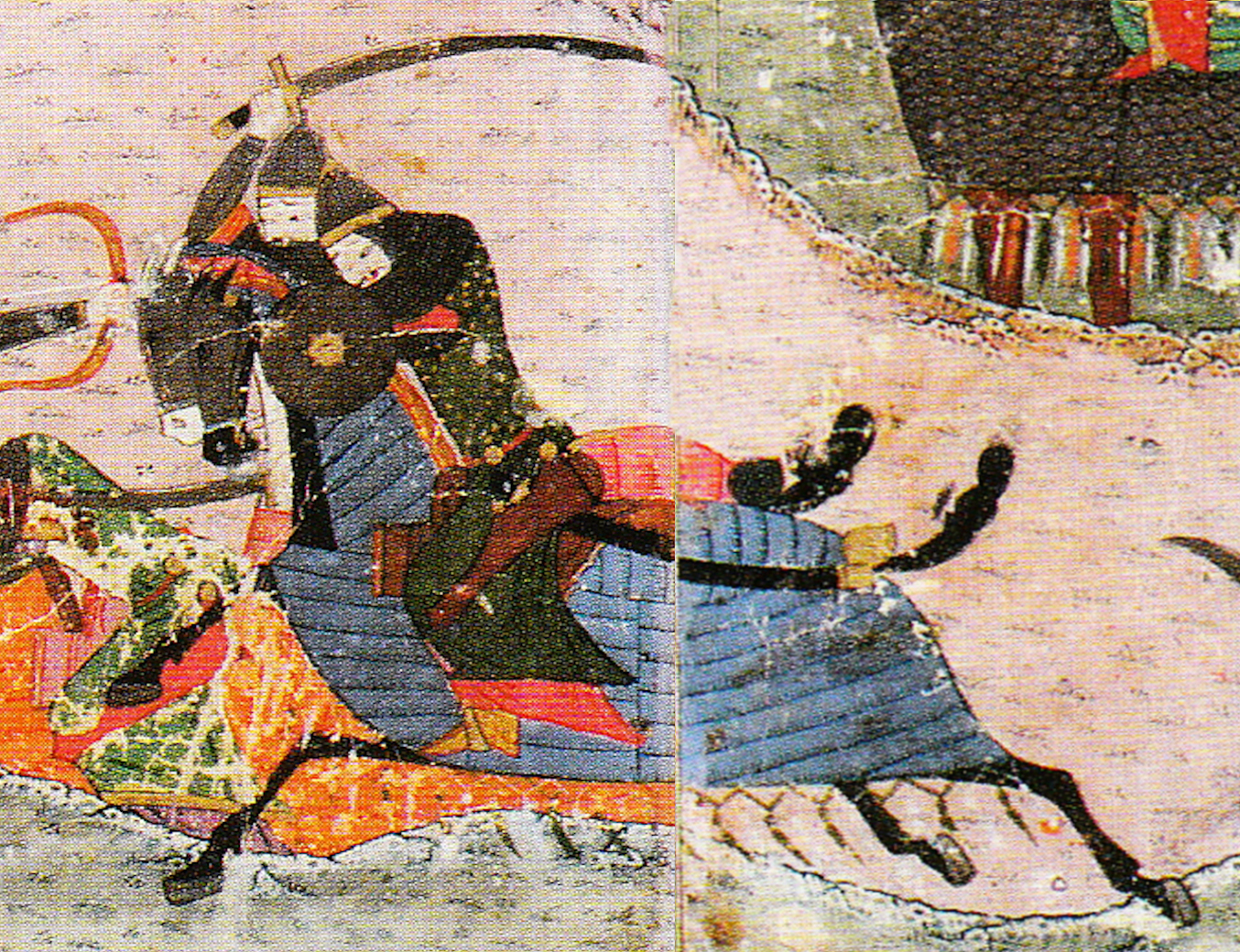
- Timurid cavalry Zafarnama ("Book of Victories"), 1436

Regions with significant populations
- Transoxiana, Western Turkestan

Religion
- Sunni Islam

Related ethnic groups
- Timurids, Moghuls, Uzbeks, Kazakhs

Chaghatays or Chagatais, Chaghatay people (Chagatay: چاغاتاي) were names used for a part of the nomadic population of the Chagatai Khanate from the second half of the 13th century to the second half of the 15th century.

The name derives from Chagatai Khan, a son of Genghis Khan. By the 14th century, as a result of interaction between nomadic groups and the settled population, a distinct historical and cultural complex had formed, whose bearers came to be referred to as Chagatai Turks. Around the same time, the Chagatai language and the Chagatai literary tradition developed.

== Etymology ==
The name Chagatai used for the population of the Chagatai Khanate derives from the name of Chagatai Khan.

== Origins ==
The Turkic peoples known in the post-Mongol period as Chagatais originated from the Chagatai ulus the population of the Mongol Empire formed from the military units assigned to Chagatai Khan (r. 1227–1241) by his father Genghis Khan.

By the time of the rise of Timur in the mid-14th century, the Chagatai ulus included tribes of Mongol and Mongolic origin such as the Barlas, Arlat, Suldus, Jalair and Dughlat, as well as new tribal groupings formed within the Mongol Empire, such as the Qara'unas.

A number of works describe the Chagatai people as being of mixed Turkic–Mongol origin. According to I. P. Magidovich, the Chagatai are descendants of the Chagatai Mongols, that is, Turkicized Mongol tribes.

=== Division into Chagatais (Timurids) and Moghuls ===
The Chagatai Khanate later divided into eastern and western parts. In the western part, the ethnonym Chagatai was used, whereas in the eastern part the ethnonym Moghul (the Persian form of the word "Mongol") was used.

Despite this division, the Chagatais and the Moghuls shared a common Chagatai-Mongol identity. The Moghul historian Muhammad Haidar Dughlat identified the Chagatais (Timurids) as Moghuls (Mongols). In his work Tarikh-i Rashidi, when discussing the four Chinggisid uluses (Northern Yuan, the Golden Horde, the Ilkhanate and the Chagatai ulus), he wrote:

One of the four was the Moghul. The Moghul then became divided into two sections, the Moghuls and the Chaghatay.

Timurid historians held the same view as well.

== History ==
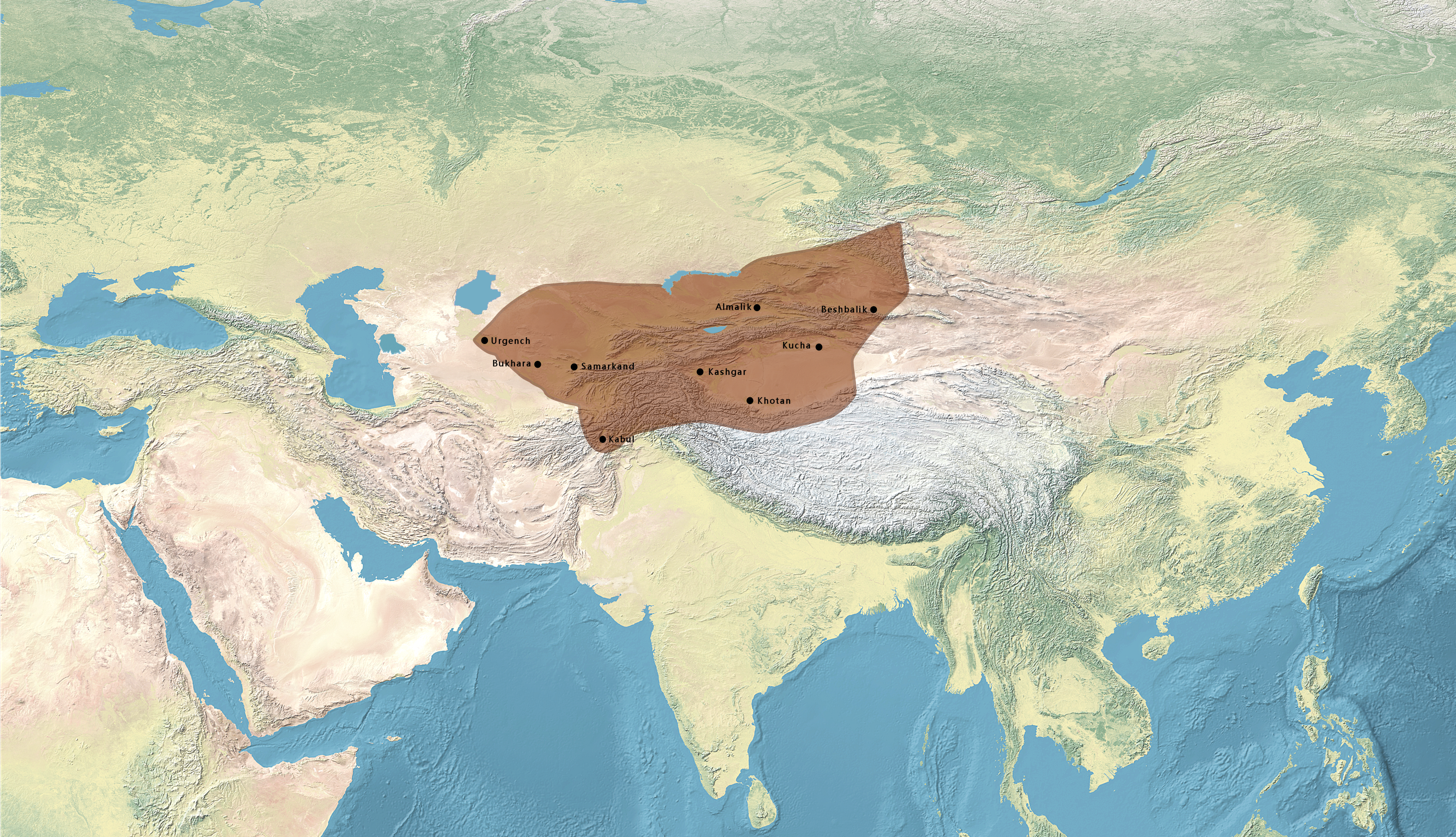
The Chagatai Khanate c. 1300

In 1224, Transoxiana became part of the Chagatai Ulus. Among Turkic-speaking peoples, it was customary to name clans and tribal subdivisions after their ancestor (or leader). Therefore, not only descendants but also the close entourage, companions, and courtiers of Chagatai Khan began to identify themselves as belonging to the Chagatai lineage.

During this period (13th–14th centuries), the term "Chagatai" initially referred to the nobles associated with Chagatai, the army, and their descendants. According to some scholars, the designation was originally applied to the Mongol tribes that formed Chagatai's army. Turkic or Turkicized nomads in Transoxiana, who in the 15th century constituted a privileged military estate—even after the disappearance of a dynasty descending from Chagatai continued to call themselves "Chagatai".

In addition to the name "Chagatai," various Turco-Mongol ethnonyms are attested in the sources for Transoxiana, including the Barlas, Dörbet, Nukus, Naiman, Polovtsians, Dulat, Kiyat, Jalayir, Suldus, Merkit, Yasavur, Qauchin, Kangly, as well as the Tulikchi, Arlat, Tatars, and others.

After the breakup of the Chagatai Khanate into two separate states in the mid-14th century, the name "Chagatai" was retained only for the western state (the Timurid Empire) and its population. The main force of Timur's army were the Chagatai. They preserved loyalty not only to nomadic traditions but also to certain Mongol customs.

The inhabitants of the two newly formed states, writes Haidar Dughlat, "because of mutual hostility call each other by different derogatory names: the Chagatai call the Moghuls 'jete', while the Moghuls call the Chagatai 'Qaraunas'".

Under Timur and his descendant Babur, the Chaghatays established the Timurid Empire in Central Asia and the Mughal Empire in South Asia, respectively. In both regions, they formed a ruling elite over the indigenous sedentary populations, including Indo-European-speaking groups such as the Tajiks in Central Asia and various populations in South Asia.

After the death of Timur in 1405, however, the political situation in the country began to change rapidly. Whereas under Timur the term "Chagatai" referred not to the entire population but only to the ruling military estate, by the 15th century it acquired a broader meaning: "Chagatai" came to denote all Turkic inhabitants of Transoxiana, not limited to its nomadic component.

Following the Uzbek conquest of Central Asia, the conquering Shibanid Uzbeks expanded their ranks by absorbing the defeated Chaghatay and Moghul nomads. Like the Chaghatays before them, the Shibanid Uzbeks formed the ruling elite over the predominantly Iranic-speaking sedentary Tajik population of Central Asia while retaining a Mongol identity. Later, the population of Transoxiana was in some sources referred to as the "Chagatai people" (Chagatai eli), in contrast to the Uzbeks of the Dasht-i Qipchaq of Shaybani Khan. In the 1520s, due to pressure from the Kazakhs, the Chaghatays and Moghul beks were forced to leave Semirechye and migrate to East Turkestan. The clans that remained nomadic in Semirechye were incorporated into the Kazakh people.

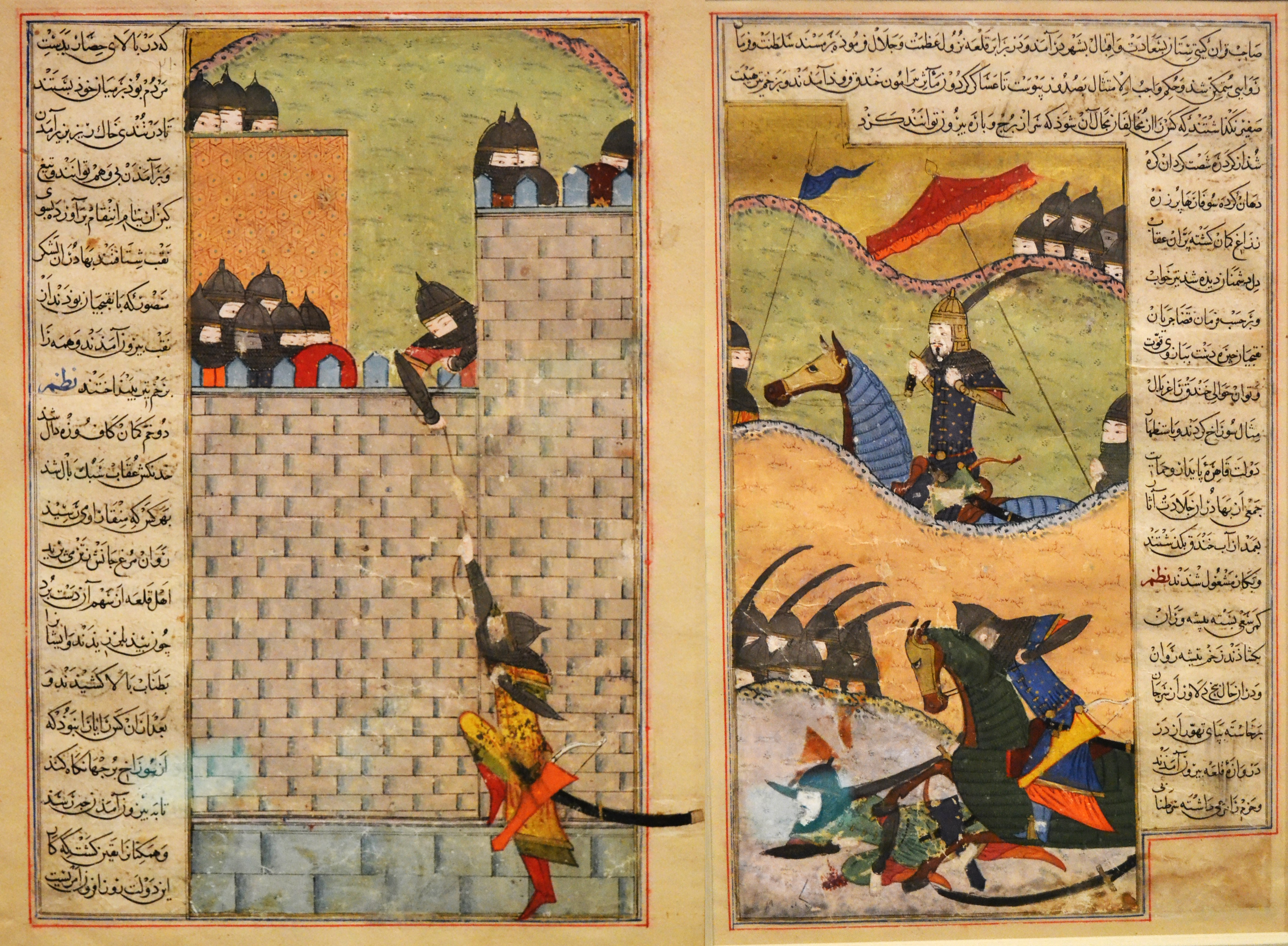
Timur attacks Aleppo in mid-November 1400, Zafarnama.

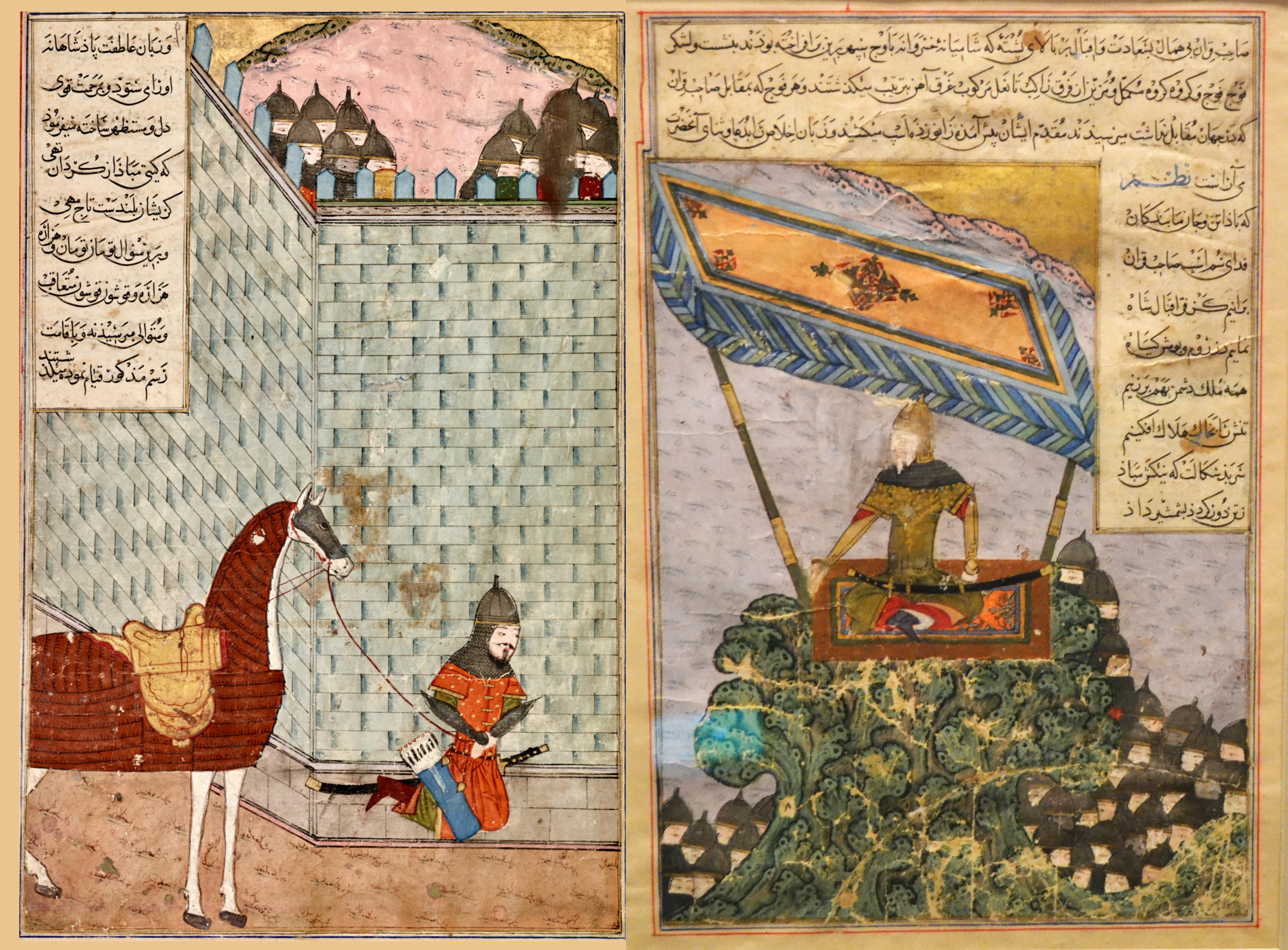
Timur reviews his troops in the plain of Sivas in the battle of Ankara in mid-summer 1402, Zafarnama (1436)

== Tribal composition ==
In the 1260s, Turco-Mongol tribes were resettled into the Chagatai Ulus to provide a military presence, each consisting of a thousand families. Four tribes were of particular importance: the Arlat, Jalayir, Qauchin, and Barlas.

Despite the fact that the Mongol tribes living in the eastern part of the ulus had long begun to speak Turkic and had intermixed with the local population, they preserved and observed ancient Mongol traditions for a long time.

Turkic or Turkicized nomads in Transoxiana in the mid-13th century are recorded in sources under various Turco-Mongol ethnonyms, including the Barlas, Dörbet, Nukus, Naiman, Kipchaks, Dulat, Kiyat, Jalayir, Suldus, Merkit, Yasavur, Qauchin, Kangly, Tulikchi, Arlat, Akhrin, Burkut, Durmen, Iyjan, Khitai, Karluk, Keneges, Uyshun, Tubai, Taymas, Tumen-ming, Shadbakhtli, Shunkarli, and others.

== Chaghatays in the 19th – early 20th centuries ==
According to ethnographic data, part of the population of Transoxiana still retained the self-designation "Chagatai" as late as the early 20th century.

In the early 20th century, separate groups of Chagatai lived in what are now the Kashkadarya and Surkhandarya regions of Uzbekistan, as well as in southern Tajikistan. A certain number of Chagatai also lived in the Navoi and Samarkand regions of Uzbekistan, as well as in northern Afghanistan, Pakistan, and northern India, where they are referred to as Mughals.

== Chaghatays in India ==
Chaghatays in India (the Timurid Mughals) also identified themselves as Chagatai. One of the historical chronicles about the Mughal rulers was titled Tazkirat al-salāṭīn-i Chaghatā ("Biographical collection of the Chagatai rulers").

The court historian of the Mughal Empire, Abu'l-Fazl Allami, explained why they were called Chagatai:

Transoxiana, Turkistan, part of Khwarazm, the lands of the Uyghur, Kashgar, Badakhshan, Balkh, and Ghazni up to the Indus River were assigned to Chaghatai. He also gave Chaghatai the covenant of Qabul Khan and Qachulai Bahadur and said: "Never act without the consent of Qarachar Noyan, and always consider him your partner in administration and finance." A pact of a father–son relationship was sworn between them. In consideration of this, this exalted and sacred line [the Timurids] was called "Chaghatai."

In South Asia, the Timurid Mughals who traced their origins to the Chagatays constituted a ruling elite over predominantly non-Turkic populations (the Hindus, among others).
