= Shah Khan =

Khan of Eastern Moghulistan from 1545 to 1570

Khan of Eastern Moghulistan (Turpan)
- Reign: 1545 – 1570
- Predecessor: Mansur Khan
- Successor: Muhammad Khan ibn Mansur Khan
- Born: unknown
- Died: 1570

Shah Khan (Chagatai and Persian: شاه خان; r. 1545 – 1570 C.E.) was the eldest son of Mansur Khan, who in 1545 C.E. retired due to ill health and handed over the reins of government to his son. Shah Khan proved to be a poor leader. He was disrespectful to his father's nobles. He was insolent and did not follow court etiquette. After the death of his father Shah Khan's younger brother Muhammad Khan ibn Mansur Khan, took Hami and declared his independence with the aid of Kalmyks or Oirats. This forced Shah Khan to take military action. Little is known of his life thereafter. It is unclear whether he was successful in subduing his brother, but when he died in 1570, Muhammad Khan ibn Mansur Khan was Khan at Turpan.
