= Turco-Mongol tradition =

14th-century ethnocultural synthesis in Asia

Turco-Mongols
Türk-i Mughūl
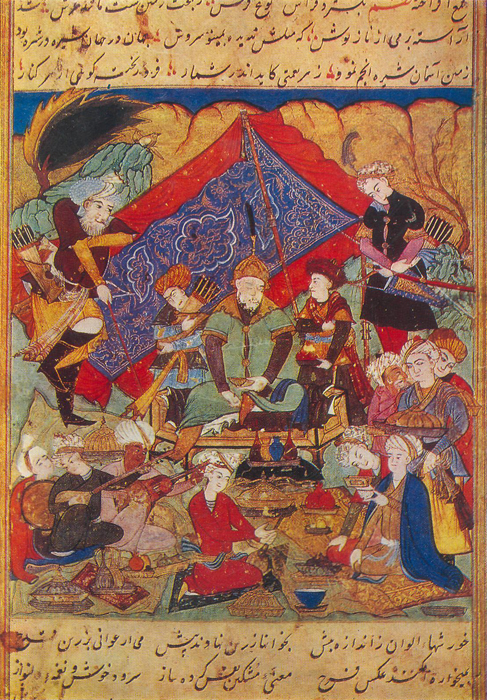
- Timur feasts in the environs of Samarkand. Zafarnama ("Book of Victories"), 1436

Languages
- Kipchak; Karluk

Religion
- Sunni Islam; Tengrism (minority)

Related ethnic groups
- Medieval Mongols, and other medieval Turkic peoples, modern Turkic-speaking peoples (Kazakhs, Uzbeks, Karakalpaks, Tatar groups, Nogais, etc.), modern Mongols, Hazaras peoples

The Turco-Mongol or Turko-Mongol tradition was an ethnocultural synthesis that arose in Asia during the 13-14th century among the ruling elites of the Golden Horde and the Chagatai Khanate. The ruling Mongol elites of these khanates eventually assimilated into the Turkic populations that they conquered and ruled over, thus becoming known as Turco-Mongols. These elites gradually adopted Islam, as well as Turkic languages, while retaining Mongol political and legal institutions.

The Chinggisid uluses included the Kazakhs, the Shaybanid Uzbeks, the Crimean Tatars, the Manghits/Noghays, and the Chaghatays (including the Moghuls, the Timurids and the Mughals). These groups shared a common language (Turkic), a political ideology based on Mongol traditions, dynastic descent from Genghis Khan, an ethnic identity described as Turco-Mongols or “Mongol Turks” (Türk-i Mughūl), and adherence to Sunni Islam. In the post-Mongol period, these politico-ethnic formations continued to dominate a vast territory stretching from Crimea in the west to the Tian Shan mountains in the east, and from Southern Siberia in the north to Northern India in the south.

The Turco-Mongols founded many Islamic successor states after the collapse of the Mongol khanates, such as the Kazakh Khanate, the Tatar khanates that succeeded the Golden Horde (e.g., Crimean Khanate, Astrakhan Khanate, Khanate of Kazan), and the Timurid Empire, which succeeded the Chagatai Khanate in Central Asia. Babur (1483–1530), a Turco-Mongol prince and a descendant of Timur, founded the Mughal Empire, which ruled much of the Indian subcontinent.

Especially among the successors of Chagatai Khanate, these Turco-Mongol elites became patrons of the Turco-Persian tradition, which was the predominant culture amongst the Muslims of Central Asia at the time. In subsequent centuries, the Turco-Persian culture was carried on further by the conquering Turco-Mongols to neighbouring regions, eventually becoming the predominant culture of a good part of the ruling and elite classes of South Asia (Indian subcontinent), specifically North India (Mughal Empire), Central Asia and the Tarim Basin (Northwest China) and large parts of West Asia (Middle East).

== Self-identification ==
=== The formation of "Mongol Turks" and their identity ===
The Mongol Empire, created by Genghis Khan and his successors in the 13th century, had a profound influence on the Turkic peoples. Before the conquest of the settled societies of outer Eurasia, the Mongol Empire unified the Eurasian steppe by successively incorporating the nomadic groups of Inner Eurasia into its structure. Initially, the Mongols proper-tribes related to Genghis Khan such as the Barlas, Qongirat, Manghud, Dughlat, and Ushin (the Nirun Mongols) united with Mongolic-speaking peoples (Kereits, Jalairs, Oirats, Tatars), as well as with Turkic-speaking groups (Naimans, Onguts, and the Uyghurs), who inhabited the Mongolian Plateau and adjacent regions. This multilingual union formed a new Mongol ulus, established at the kurultai of 1206 following Genghis Khan’s unification of the steppe. Although in modern literature it is referred to as the “Mongol Empire,” in its nature the state of Genghis Khan was a “Turko-Mongol” or “Inner Eurasian” empire.

In The Secret History of the Mongols, a 13th-century monument of Mongolian historiography, the new Mongol ulus is called the “people of the felt tents.” In the work Jami' al-tawarikh by Rashid al-Din universal history compiled under the Ilkhanids of Iran—this population is classified as consisting of two new and one original Mongol components. The emerging Mongol ulus subsequently incorporated other peoples as well Turkic (Kangly, Kipchaks) and Mongolic (Kara-Khitai) groups living in the Kipchak steppe and by the mid-13th century it split into four major Chinggisid uluses: Yuan dynasty of the Mongols, Ilkhanate, Ulus of Jochi (Golden Horde), and Ulus of Chagatai. Thus, the Mongol (Chinggisid) uluses of the 13th century arose from the fusion of the Mongols proper with various Mongolic and Turkic-speaking groups of the steppes of Mongolia and the Desht-i Kipchak.

After the death of the fourth khan Möngke in 1259, the Mongol Empire effectively split into four separate states, which existed until the mid-14th century. Two sedentary Chinggisid states the Yuan Empire and Ilkhanate ceased to exist in the second half of the 14th century. The Mongols of China returned to the Mongolian steppes in 1368 following the overthrow of the Yuan dynasty by the Ming Empire in the 1360s, while the Ilkhanid Mongols were assimilated by the Turkmen tribes of Iran and Anatolia, and later by the Timurid Empire in the late 14th to early 15th centuries. At the same time, the Golden Horde and the Chagatai Khanate, as well as their successor states, continued to rule vast territories of the Kipchak Steppe and Central Asia, preserving a Mongol identity for approximately four more centuries until their conquest by the Russian Empire.

=== Golden Horde and Chagatai Khanate ===
From the mid-14th century, the population of the Golden Horde and the Chagatai Ulus began to adopt Islam and use Turkic languages (of the Kipchak or Karluk groups) as a lingua franca. By the 15th century, these Muslim Turkic-speaking communities gradually developed into distinct ethnopolitical identities — Chaghatays, Moghuls, Uzbeks, Kazakhs, and Tatars. In academic literature, these peoples are often referred to as “Turks” or “Turkicized Mongols,” although in many respects they remained close to the Mongols of the 13th century.

Gold coin minted in Isfahan in 1384 CE, bearing the names of Timur and his Chinggisid puppet khan, Soyurghatmish.

Like other Chinggisid uluses of the 13th century, they were ruled by leaders descended from Genghis Khan or from the Mongol tribal aristocracy. The Uzbeks, Kazakhs, and Tatars were led by descendants of Jochi, the eldest son of Genghis Khan; the Moghuls were ruled by descendants of Chagatai, his second son; while the Chaghatays of the Timurid states and the Mughals of India were governed by descendants of Timur, a representative of the Mongol Barlas tribe. Their tribal composition was also similar: it included tribes of Mongol origin (Barlas, Barin, Dughlat, Manghit, Qongirat, Ushin, and others), tribes of non-Mongol but Mongolic- or Turkic-speaking origin (Jalair, Kereit, Tatar, Naiman, Ongut, Uyghur, and others), groups of Kipchak origin (Kipchaks, Kangly), as well as new tribal formations that emerged within the Mongol (Chinggisid) states (Shirin and Ming).

The Chaghatays, Moghuls, Shaybanid Uzbeks, Kazakhs, and Tatars identified themselves as belonging to or descending from the Mongol ulus. None of these peoples traced their origins to pre-Mongol Turkic states or peoples such as the Qarakhanids, Kipchaks, or Seljuks (Turkmens). Contemporaries (including the Ottomans and the Russians) also regarded them as descendants of the Mongols. In particular, the 16th-century Ottoman historian Seyfi Çelebi, in his work on the history of the peoples of Inner Eurasia, divided the descendants of Genghis Khan of his time into the following groups: the Tatars of Crimea, the Uzbeks of Bukhara, the Kazakhs of the steppe, the Moghuls of Kashgaria, and the Qalmaqs (the Northern Yuan Mongols) beyond Kashgar.

== Antecedents ==
Before the time of Genghis Khan, Turkic and Mongolic peoples exchanged words with each other, with Turkic languages being more active than Mongolic. Extensive lexical borrowings from Proto-Turkic into the Proto-Mongolic language occurred from at latest the first millennium BCE. Due to these exchanges, Turkic and Mongolic languages share extensive similarities in their personal pronouns, among other lexical similarities; however, they seem to date to before this era as they already existed before the breakup of the Turkic people around 500 BCE. A still more ancient period of prolonged language contact between Turkic and Mongolic languages is indicated by further and more fundamental phonotactic, grammatical, and typological similarities (e.g. synchronic vowel harmony, lack of grammatical gender, extensive agglutination, highly similar phonotactic rules and phonology).

In the past, these similarities were attributed to a genetic relationship and led to the widespread acceptance of an Altaic language family. More recently, due to the lack of a definitive demonstration of a genetic relationship, these similarities have been divided into these three known periods of language contact. The similarities have led to the proposal of a Northeast Asian sprachbund instead, which also includes the Tungusic, Koreanic, and Japonic language families, although Turkic and Mongolic display the most extensive similarities. According to recent aggregation and research, there are doublets, which are considered to be the same in terms of their roots, found in the vocabulary in Mongolian language and Turkic loanwords. Also, words of Turkic origin are the most common loanwords in Mongolian vocabulary.

== Language ==
=== Kipchak ===
A page from Khorezmi’s Muḥabbat-nāma (written in the Old Uyghur script), a collection of Khorezmian Turkic love poems composed for Muḥammad Qoja Beg, a Golden Horde official, in 1353–1354 CE.

Following the Mongol conquests, the ruling Mongol elites of the Mongol successor states began a process of assimilation with the non-Mongol populations that they ruled over. The population of the Golden Horde was largely a mixture of Turks and Mongols who adopted Islam later, as well as smaller numbers of Finno-Ugric peoples, Alans, Slavs, and people from the Caucasus, among others (whether Muslim or not).

Most of the Horde's population was Turkic: Kipchaks, Cumans, Volga Bulgars, Khwarezmians, and others. The Horde was gradually Turkified and lost its Mongol identity, while the descendants of Batu's original Mongol warriors constituted the upper class. They were commonly called Tatars by Russians and other Europeans. Russians preserved this common name for this group down to the 20th century. Whereas most members of this group identified themselves by their ethnic or tribal names, most also considered themselves to be Muslims. Most of the population, both sedentary and nomadic, adopted the Kypchak language, which developed into the regional languages of Kypchak groups after the Horde disintegrated.

=== Karluk ===
In the Chagatai Khanate, the Turkic language that was adopted by the Mongol elites became known as the Chagatai language, a descendant of Karluk Turkic. The Chagatai language was the native language of the Timurid dynasty, a Turco-Mongol dynasty which gained power in Central Asia after the decline of the Chagatai khans. Chagatai is the predecessor of the modern Karluk branch of Turkic languages, which includes Uzbek and Uyghur.

== Religion ==
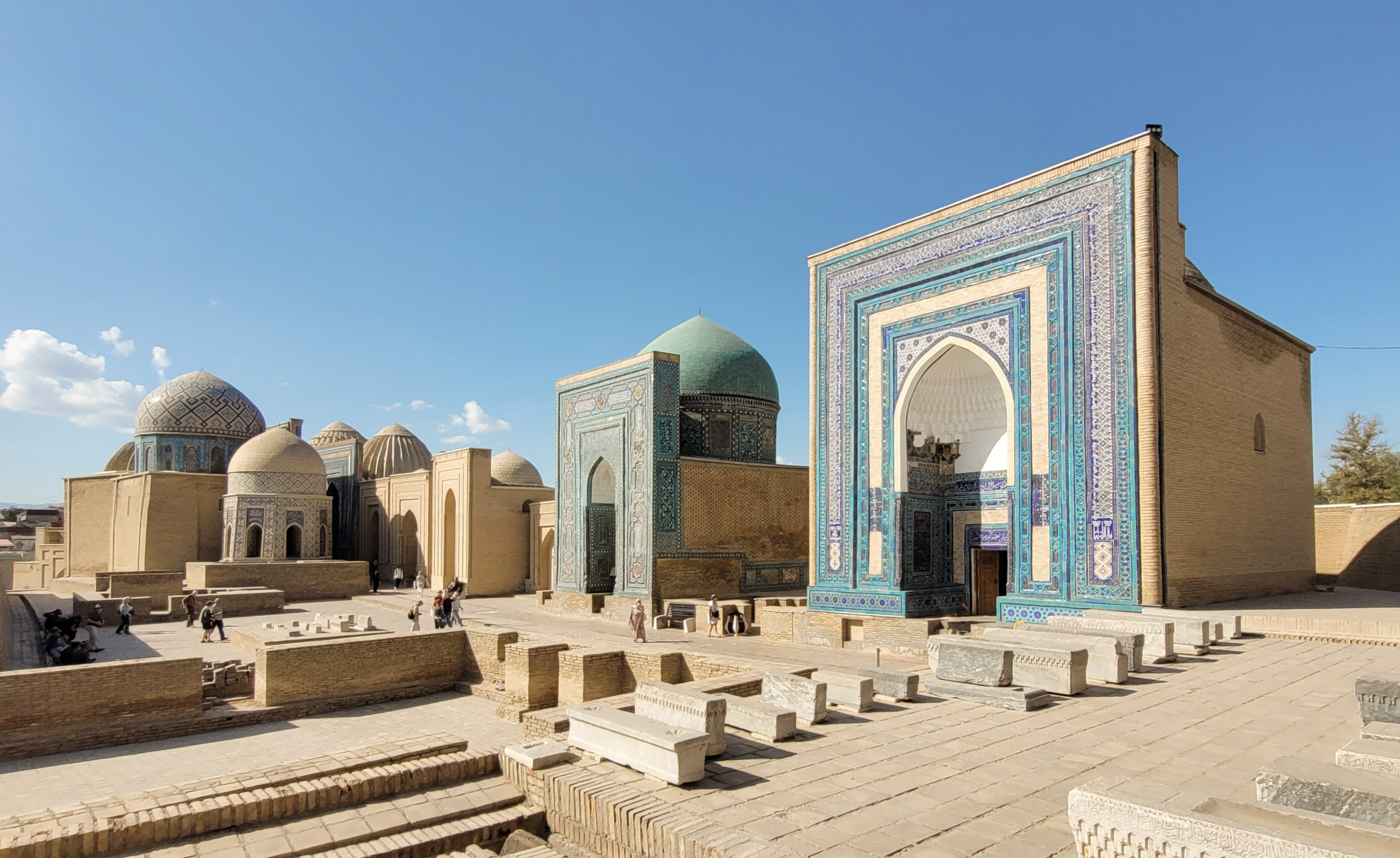
The Turco-Mongol conqueror Timur made Samarkand the capital of his empire

The Mongols during the period of the early Mongol conquests and the conquests of Genghis Khan largely followed Tengrism. However, the successor states of the Mongol Empire, the Ilkhanate, Golden Horde and Chagatai Khanate ruled over large Muslim populations. The Ilkhanate and Chagatai Khanate in particular ruled over Muslim-majority populations in Iran and Central Asia, respectively.

In the Golden Horde, Uzbeg (Öz-Beg) assumed the throne in 1313 and adopted Islam as the state religion. He proscribed Buddhism and Shamanism among the Mongols in Russia, thus reversing the spread of the Yuan culture. By 1315, Uzbeg had successfully Islamicized the Horde, killing Jochid princes and Buddhist lamas who opposed his religious policy and succession of the throne. Uzbeg Khan continued the alliance with the Mamluks begun by Berke and his predecessors. He kept a friendly relationship with the Mamluk Sultan and his shadow Caliph in Cairo. After a long delay and much discussion, he married a princess from his family to Al-Nasir Muhammad, Sultan of Egypt. Under Uzbeg and his successor Jani Beg (1342–1357), Islam, which among some of the Turks in Eurasia had deep roots going back into pre-Mongol times, gained general acceptance, though its adherents remained tolerant of other beliefs.

The Northern Yuan dynasty and Turco-Mongol residual states and domains by the 15th century

In order to successfully expand Islam, the Mongols built mosques and other "elaborate places" requiring baths—an important element of Muslim culture. Sarai attracted merchants from other countries. The slave trade flourished due to strengthening ties with the Mamluk Sultanate. Growth of wealth and increasing demand for products typically produce population growth, and so it was with Sarai. Housing in the region increased, which transformed the capital into the centre of a large Muslim Sultanate.

In the Chagatai Khanate, Mubarak Shah converted to Islam, and over time, the Chagatai elite became entirely Islamized. The Chagatai Khanate was succeeded by the Timurid Empire in Central Asia, founded by the Turco-Mongol warrior Timur. According to John Joseph Saunders, Timur was "the product of an Islamized and Iranized society", and not steppe nomadic. To legitimize his conquests, Timur relied on Islamic symbols and language, referred to himself as the "Sword of Islam", and patronized educational and religious institutions. He converted nearly all the Borjigin leaders to Islam during his lifetime. Timur decisively defeated the Christian Knights Hospitaller at the Siege of Smyrna, styling himself a ghazi.

== Turkification and cultural assimilation ==
In both the Golden Horde and Chagatai Khanate cases, the Turkification and development of Turco-Persian tradition existed, but with a rather different process. This is due to, according from Soviet Mongolist Boris Vladimirtsov, who emphasized that "the Mongols who moved westward were quickly Turkified and generally assimilated into the surrounding ethnographic environment, which was more or less akin to them." However, he added that in northern Central Asia the process of adopting "Muslim" culture by the Mongols proceeded more slowly than in Persia and the Central Asian heartland of Transoxiana, Khorasan, Khwarazm, and Tarim Basin, due to their close proximity to other ethnically related Turkic nomads.

=== Golden Horde ===
In the Golden Horde, especially during the reign of Özbeg Khan, a significant process of Turkification occurred among the Mongols living in the ulus. The secretary of the Egyptian sultan, Ibn Fadlallah al-Umari, explicitly described this process, stating:

"In ancient times, this state (the Golden Horde) was the land of the Kipchaks, but when it was conquered by the Tatars, the Kipchaks became their subjects. Later, as the Tatars intermingled and intermarried with them, the land itself overcame the original qualities and racial characteristics of the Tatars. All of them became exactly like Kipchaks, as if they were of the same stock. The Mongols settled in the land of the Kipchaks and remained there among them. Thus, long habitation in a land alters human nature and changes one's inherent features according to the nature of the country, as we said before."

A similar perspective was expressed in the 18th century by Johann Eberhard Fischer, who described the Tatars as "the most populous among all Turkic peoples," and explained:

"That the name 'Tatar' later prevailed and became confused with the Mongols may be due to the fact that the Tatars, after being united under Genghis Khan's rule, served in his and his successors' armies in much greater numbers than the Mongols themselves. This can be concluded from the fact that in all those conquered lands, which previously had their own languages and were unfamiliar with either the Mongol or Tatar tongues, only the Tatar language came into use, while Mongolian disappeared. This would not have happened if the Tatars had not greatly outnumbered the Mongols."

However, as Vladimirtsov had alluded, the Golden Horde was too far away from many main Islamic centres, and thus, despite adoption of Islam, their Islam had proven not as strictly connected to wider Islam as seen among the rivalling Turkic groups like Oghuz and Karluks, and more influenced by Mongol elements instead. This ultimately resulted in the Kipchaks being the most Turco-Mongolised people and the strongest embodiment of Turco-Mongol legacies within the Turkic world; later dispersal caused their Islamic adaption to be altered to whatever the environments required them later on, and even incorporating other beliefs like Roman Catholicism, Eastern Orthodox Christianity, Confucianism, and Tibetan Buddhism alongside their dominant Hanafi school of Islam; which had prevented the Turco-Persian tradition from taking a deeper and stronger institutional role compared to that of Oghuz and Karluk groups.

=== Chagatai Khanate ===
This is especially strong among successors of Chagatai Khanate, as these Turco-Mongol elites of Karluk ethnicities became patrons of the Turco-Persian tradition, which was the predominant culture amongst the Muslims of the Central Asian heartland at the time. In subsequent centuries, the Turco-Persian culture was carried on further by the conquering Turco-Mongols to neighbouring regions, eventually becoming the predominant culture of a good part of the ruling and elite classes of South Asia, specifically North India, Central Asia and the Tarim Basin (Northwest China) and large parts of West Asia (Middle East). Numerous entities like the Timurid Empire, Mughal Empire and Altishahr Moghulistan, Turpan Khanate and Yarkent Khanate were the products of this Turkification and Turco-Persianate court traditions among these Mongols.

Impressively, this process did not even exist only among the Karluks, but also appeared among the Kipchak-born Shaybanids and Janids, who expelled the Timurids in 1507 to control the Central Asian heartland as the Khanate of Bukhara, only to enter the reversed Karlukification in process before ultimately saw themselves as heirs and developers of Timurid civilisation, and reconciled with the Mughals in India, forging the modern identities of Uzbek, Uyghur people and numerous Central and South Asian Muslim groups, all with partial Mongol links but too deeply embedded with the Turco-Persianate legacies than with that of Mongol one.

== See also ==
- 16 Great Turkic Empires
- Mughal people
- Barlas
- Chagatai language
- Division of the Mongol Empire
- Hazaras
- Ilkhanate
- Inner Asia
- List of Mongol states
- Mongol invasions and conquests
- Mongolization
- Tartary
- Tatar confederation
- Turanism
- Turco-Persian tradition
- Turkic peoples
- Turkification
- Uzbekisation
- Yuan dynasty in Inner Asia

== Citations ==
- Lee, Joo-Yup (2019). "The Kazakh Khanate". In Ludden, David (ed.). The Oxford Research Encyclopedia of Asian History. New York: Oxford University Press. doi:10.1093/acrefore/9780190277727.013.60. ISBN 978-0-19-027772-7.
- Lee, Joo-Yup; Ludden, David (2019). "Turkic Identity in Mongol and post-Mongol Central Asia and the Qipchaq Steppe". The Oxford Research Encyclopedia of Asian History. Oxford University Press: 39.
- Lee, Joo-Yup (2024). "The Turko-Mongols (or "Mongol Turks") of the Qipchaq Steppe and Central Asia". The Turkic Peoples in World History. New York: Routledge. p. 224. doi:10.4324/9781003256496-5. ISBN 9781032170015.
