= Qamil =

Mongol kingdom in present-day China (c. 1389–1513)

Qamil 哈密國
- c. 1389–1513
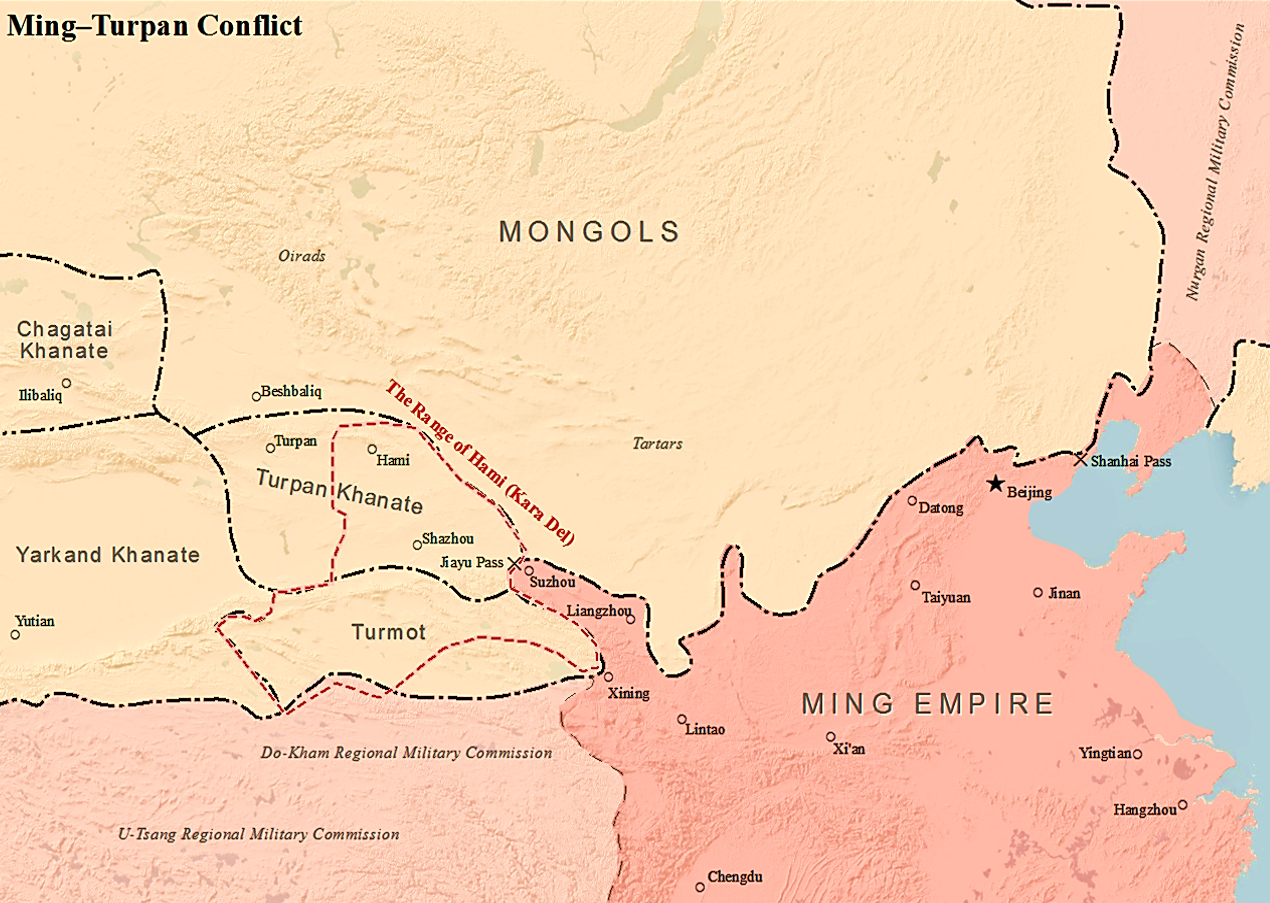
- Location of Qamil
- Status: Vassal of the Ming dynasty (1404–1513)
- Capital: Qamil (Hami)
- Common languages: Mongolian, Old Uyghur language
- Government: Monarchy
- Khan
- Historical era: Post-classical
  - Gunashiri breaks away from Northern Yuan dynasty: c. 1389
  - Kara Del accepts Ming supremacy: 1404
  - Conquered by Esen of the Northern Yuan: 1430s
  - Coup staged by pro-Mongol faction: 1463
  - Ming restores Gunashiri dynasty: 1467
  - Mansur Khan from the Chagatai Khanate overthrows the Gunashiri dynasty and the region converts to Islam: 1513
Preceded by	Succeeded by
Chagatai Khanate; Northern Yuan dynasty	Moghulistan
- Today part of: China

Qamil or Kara Del was a kingdom that existed in Kumul or Hami, in present-day Xinjiang. It was founded by the Yuan prince Gunashiri, a descendant of Chagatai Khan, in the late 14th century (c. 1389), and ruled by the Chagatayids thereafter until 1463. From 1380s, it began to pay tribute to the Ming dynasty. From 1406, it was governed by Ming under the "Hami Guard" (Chinese: 哈密衛); however, sometimes it was still under the influence of the Northern Yuan, and the ruler was called the Obedient King (Chinese: 忠順王) under the Jimi system. It was destroyed in 1513 as a result of the wars between the Ming dynasty and the Oirats, as well as dynastic succession struggles.

== History ==
In 1389, the Buddhist Chagataid prince Gunashiri broke away from the Northern Yuan dynasty, which had fallen under the reign of Jorightu Khan Yesüder, an Arig-Bokid prince. He established himself in Qamil (Hami) by 1390 and ruled over a Uyghur population. The next year, the Ming dynasty occupied his territory and forced him to submit, although he remained in control of his territory.

In 1404, Gunashiri's successor Engke Temiir accepted the establishment of a Ming guard and became Hami Prefecture. However the Ming did not directly govern Hami or collect taxes. Engke Temiir was granted the title Zhongshunwang (meaning the obedient prince) by the Ming court. During the 1430s, Kara Del submitted to the Oirats. The Uyghurs of Hami came into regular contact with Mongols in southwestern Inner Mongolia. Several Uyghur chiefs became major leaders of the western Mongols, leading to the spread of Uyghurjin as a clan name in the Ordos area.

In 1446, disturbances broke out in Hami. Ming forces under Ren Li occupied the city and deported 1,230 people to the east of Jiayuguan.

In 1463 the khan was overthrown by a pro-Mongol faction and a serious succession crisis ensued. From 1467, the Ming emperors repeatedly reinstalled members of Gunashiri's house but the situation in Hami never stabilized. Hami was conquered by Mansur Khan, the ruler of Moghulistan in 1513. Kara Del officially converted to Islam in 1513.

It was reported that between Khitay and Khotan the Sarigh Uyghur tribes who were "impious" resided, and they were targeted for ghazat (holy war) by Mansur Khan following 1516. After the islamization of Kara Del, Uyghur fell into disuse until the 20th century, except as a local term for Muslim Turks in Hami and Turpan. In 1923, Uyghur was revived again as a general designation for Xinjiang's Tarim Basin oasis dwellers.

== Culture ==
Buddhism survived in Uyghurstan (Turfan and Qocho) during the Ming dynasty.

== List of rulers of Kara Del ==
According to Japanese Wikipedia (ja:グナシリ):

- Unaširi (兀納失里) (1380–1393)
- Engke Temür (安克帖木兒) (1393–1405) (Vassal of Ming dynasty since June 1404)
- Toqto (脫脫) (1405–1411) (Vassal of Ming dynasty)
- Manglī Temür (免力帖木兒) (1411–1425) (Vassal of Ming dynasty)
- Budaširi (卜答失里) (1425–1439) (Originally vassal of Ming dynasty, later of Northern Yuan dynasty). He was rivalled firstly Toγon Temür (脫歡帖木兒) (1427–1437) and Toqto Temür (脫脫塔木兒) (1437–1439), the son of rival.
- Khalīl sulṭān (哈力鎖鲁檀) (1439–1457) (Originally vassal of Northern Yuan dynasty till 1455, later of Ming dynasty)
- Bürege (卜列革) (1457–1460)
- Nugandaširi (1460–1467), queen mother

Rivalry between Nugandaširi (努溫答失里) (1460–1472) and Baγ Temür (把塔木兒) (1466–1472)

- Qanšin (罕慎) (1472–1488)
- Engke Bolad (奄克孛剌) (1488–1492) and (1493–1497)
- Šamba (陕巴) (1492–1493) and (1497–1505)
- Beyazıt (拜牙即) (1505–1513)

== See also ==
- Kingdom of Qocho
- Ming–Turpan conflict
- Ming dynasty in Inner Asia
- Turkic settlement of the Tarim Basin

== Bibliography ==
- Atwood, Christopher P. (2004), Encyclopedia of Mongolia and the Mongol Empire, Facts On File
