= Uzbekisation =

Demographic and cultural assimilation process

Uzbekisation or Uzbekization is the process of forcing or inducing an Uzbek identity on people or cultural heritage through a variety of administrative means. The term refers to the specific forms of indigenisation (korenizacija) that took place in Uzbekistan during the process of national delimitation in Central Asia in the 1920s and early 1930s.

== Ancient and medieval assimilation ==
=== Chagatai Khanate ===
Genghis Khan's son Chagatai Khan originally governed the khanate named after himself, spanned from Xinjiang to Khorasan, as part of the Mongol Empire. Overtime, the Khanate experienced Karlukification, in which giving birth to a distinctive culture that, while carrying Turco-Mongol traditions, became very much Karluk Turkified nation.

=== Khanate of Bukhara ===
The Shaybanids, also known as Uzbeks, were led by Muhammad Shaybani, and originally traced origin from the Kipchak people that had expelled the Timurids from Central Asia to gain control of Transoxiana. Once the Shaybanids came to dominate the region and founded the Khanate of Bukhara, they underwent massive Karlukification of their culture; by the 17th century, most Shaybanid Uzbeks and their descendant khanates (now known as Janids) were entirely assimilated to Karluk frameworks and reconciled with the Timurid dynasty in India by proclaiming themselves heirs and protectors of Timurid heritages.

=== Xinjiang ===
When Qing dynasty conquered the Dzungar Khanate in 1755, out of distrust for the nomadic people like Dzungars, Kazakhs and Kyrgyz, Qianlong Emperor triggered the Dzungar genocide to exterminate all nomadic people; the Uzbeks and Uyghurs of Altishahr took part in the mass slaughter of these nomads. The result was that nearly 80% of Dzungars, and an unknown (but high) number of Kazakhs and Kyrgyz perished; Qianlong later resettled these Uzbeks to Dzungarian basin once inhabited by these nomads, permanently exterminated Kipchak and Mongolian majoritarian presences in the region.

=== Kokand ===
The Khanate of Kokand was infamously oppressive of the Kipchak Kyrgyz and Kazakhs, viewing them with disdain as the Kokandi Uzbek rulers considered themselves civilised while Kipchaks as savage nomads. Muhammad Khudayar Khan ordered total persecution of all Kipchaks, be it Kazakhs or Kyrgyz, and to replace them with Karluk settlers.

=== Afghanistan and South Asia ===
The Timurid Empire had managed to dominate the whole Turan for more than a century, during which the Timurid rulers facilitated the transformation of Afghanistan's landscape originally from just Indo-Iranian Pashtuns and Tajiks with an increasing Karlukification, which centres like Herat and Kabul had become the centre of Chagatai literacy heritage. This also meant a large portion of Karluk Turks like the future Uzbeks, Uyghurs and, partly Hazaras, entered and dominated northern Afghanistan; today, Uzbeks constitute the third largest ethnic group in Afghanistan, after that of Pashtuns and Tajiks.

Karluk influence in South Asia is more subtle, via the Mughal Empire in India founded by Babur, often via various traditions (mostly Islamic) practised by the Mughal court, as well as architecture; at the same time, it also blended with local population, playing roles in the development of modern cultures of Pakistan, Bangladesh and India. Already by the 17th century, various European accounts, like François Bernier and Niccolao Manucci, referred to the Mughal rulers as "Uzbek", which was a misnomer though related to the Karlukification of the Shaybanids and descendants earlier in Central Asia.

== Modern assimilation ==
=== Soviet era ===
Because of assimilation pressures that began in 1924 with the creation of the Uzbek SSR, ethnic Tajiks often chose to identify themselves as Uzbeks in population census forms and preferred to be registered as Uzbek in their passports, to avoid leaving the republic for the less‑developed agricultural and mountainous Tajikistan.

=== Post-Soviet era ===
After the dissolution of the Soviet Union, the term "Uzbekization" has been applied to the processes in Uzbekistan that reverse the results of Sovietization and Russification. Among these are restoring the importance of Uzbek language, which replaced the Russian language in obligatory education, promotion of Uzbek tradition and culture.

==== Karakalpakstan and Kazakh minorities ====
The Karakalpaks are Kipchak Turkic people, whose culture is closer to Kazakhstan and Kyrgyzstan than that of Uzbekistan. Uzbek government has sponsored multiple discriminatory policies against Karakalpaks, including forcible assimilation attempts.

Kazakh minorities have been historically treated better than Kyrgyz, Tajik or Karakalpak minorities. However, Kazakhs tend to be seen with distrust due to their nomadic life and thus sometimes suffer discrimination.

==== Tajik minorities ====
While official Uzbek statistics place the total Tajik population in Uzbekistan at about 5%, subjective expert estimates suggest that the Tajiks may account for as much as 25%-30% of the total population of the country.

==== In Kyrgyzstan ====
In 1990, a massive ethnic unrest broke out in Osh, after dispute between Kyrgyz herders and Uzbek sedentary farms slid into full-blown clashes.

The 2010 South Kyrgyzstan ethnic clashes, which occurred between Kyrgyz and Uzbeks, was started over the fear of Uzbekisation, which many Kyrgyz believed Uzbeks were trying to "take over" southern Kyrgyzstan.

== See also ==
- Turkification
- Sinicization
- Russification
- Mongolization
- Karakalpakstan
- 2022 Karakalpak protests
- Turco-Mongol tradition
- Turco-Persian tradition
