= Mansur Khan (Moghul Khan) =

Khan of Moghulistan from 1503 to 1543

Khan of Moghulistan
- Reign: 1503 – 1543
- Predecessor: Ahmad Alaq (Eastern Moghulistan); Mahmud Khan (Western Moghulistan)
- Successor: Shah Khan (Eastern Moghulistan or Turpan)
- Born: 1482/1483
- Died: 1543 (aged 59–61)
- Issue: Shah Khan; Muhammad Khan
- House: Borjigin
- Father: Ahmad Alaq
- Mother: Sahib Daulat Begum

Mansur Khan (Chagatai and Persian: منصور خان; Chinese: 速檀满速儿; pinyin: Sùtán Mǎnsù'ér; 1482/3–1543), was the last khan of a united Moghulistan from 1503 until his death. From his father Ahmad Alaq, the previous khan, he inherited the eastern parts of Moghulistan proper (Ili area), the Muslim oasis cities of Yanqi, Bay, and Kuqa, and the Buddhist "Uighur" holdout of Turfan. He also led a jihad of conquest against Oirat Mongol and Chinese territories to the east, including Hami and Dunhuang, and attempted to convert the Kyrgyz to Islam.

Following his death, the khanate was permanently divided into Western and Eastern portions which would themselves eventually devolve into smaller states.

== Life ==
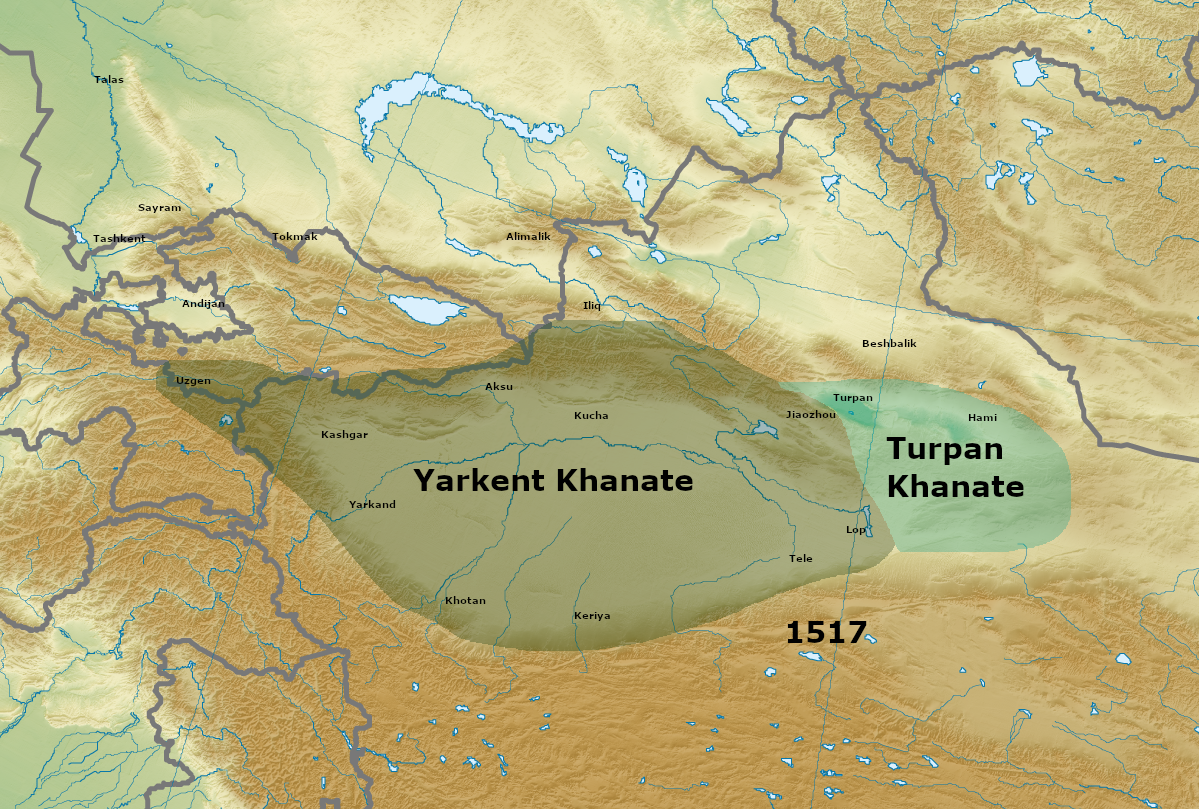
Yarkent Khanate and Mansur's Turpan Khanate in 1517

When he was nineteen, Mansur was made khan by his father, who departed to join his brother Mahmud Khan in a campaign against the Shaybanid Uzbeks of Transoxiana. The campaign ended in disaster, as both Ahmad and Mahmud were captured. They were released but Ahmad died shortly after in Aksu. Following Ahmad's death, Mansur set up his court in Aksu.

=== Rebellion and expeditions ===
Mansur's rule was quickly challenged by the Dughlat amir Mirza Aba Bakr, who, although in theory was a Moghul vassal, reigned virtually independently in Yarkand and Kashgar. The Mirza set out with an army for Aksu; upon learning of this Mansur prepared the town for a siege and departed. Aksu was taken by storm and plundered, after which the Mirza's army destroyed the towns of Bai and Kucha before returning to Kashgar.

In 1508 Mansur's uncle Mahmud Khan left western Moghulistan (present Kyrgyzstan) for the Shaybanid court in Transoxiana; Mansur's brothers Said Khan (Sultan Said Khan) and Sultan Khalil Sultan assumed his place as leaders of that country. Mansur promptly invaded western Moghulistan and defeated his brothers in battle, forcing them to flee to Ferghana. He deported the Moghuls and Kyrgyzs of western Moghulistan to Turfan, and put to death most of the Kyrgyzs.

The next few years of Mansur's reign saw several mostly successful expeditions against the Oirats to the north. Several of his brothers also revolted against him, although they did not seriously threaten his rule as khan. When Said Khan conquered Kashgar from Mirza Aba Bakr in 1514, however, Mansur feared that Said Khan would take revenge on him for his attack upon him six years before. Instead, Said Khan decided to submit to him and agreed to place Mansur's name in the khutba. Peace was therefore made between the two brothers in 1516, with Mansur ruling in Turfan and Said Khan in Kashgar, and was not broken until the death of Said Khan.

=== War with China and death ===
In 1513 the Qara Del prince of Hami, which lay to the east of Turfan, switched his allegiance from the Chinese Ming Emperor to Mansur Khan. After this several expeditions were undertaken by the khan against China proper. Mansur Khan army annexed Shazhou (Dunhuang) and reached the Jiayu Pass in Gansu- the westernmost point in Great Wall of China. He furthermore fought the Kazakhs in northern Moghulistan (present Semirechye of Kazakhstan), but was defeated; after this the campaigns against his neighbors became fewer.

During the Moghul war against China, the Chinese Ming Dynasty defeated multiple raids by the Turpan Kingdom under Mansur allied with the Mongols under Ibrahim who fled Batumöngke Dayan Khan of Mongolia-based Northern Yuan, over disputes on tribute. In 1517, 1524, and 1528 battles broke out. The Ming had rejected many tribute missions from Turpan. Mansur tried to attack China in 1524 with 20,000 men, but was beaten by Chinese forces. The Ming forces repulsed the Turpan forces and Mongols from their raid on Suzhou District. The Chinese refused to lift the economic blockade and restrictions that had led to the battles, and continued restricting Turpan's tribute and trade with China. Turfan also annexed Hami.

In 1533 Said Khan died and his son Abd ar-Rashid Khan succeeded him. Mansur responded by undertaking a campaign against Aksu, but failed to gain anything. Some time later he attempted a second time but again was unsuccessful. In 1543 he died and was succeeded in his remaining domains by his eldest son Shah Khan (1543-1570).

== Chaghatai Khanate ==
Preceded by Ahmad Alaq	Moghul Khan (in Eastern Moghulistan); 1503–1543	Succeeded by Shah Khan
Preceded by Mahmud Khan	Moghul Khan (in Western Moghulistan); 1508–1514	Succeeded by Sultan Said Khan
