= Timurid Empire =

Turco-Mongol empire (1370–1507)

Timurid Empire ایران و توران Iran-o-Turan
- 1370–1507
- Motto: Persian:راستى رستى; Rāstī rustī "In rectitude lies salvation"
- The Timurid Empire in 1405
- Status: Emirate
- Capital: Samarkand (1370–1405; 1447–1459); Herat (1405–1447; 1459–1507)
- Common languages: Persian (official, court language, high literature, lingua franca, administration); Chagatai Turkic (dynastic, literature); Arabic (theology, coinage)
- Religion: Sunni Islam (official)
- Government: Absolute monarchy
- Emir
  - 1370–1405: Timur (first)
  - 1506–1507: Badi' al-Zaman (last)
- Historical era: Late Middle Ages
  - Timur begins conquests: 1363
  - Establishment of Timurid Empire: 1370
  - Westward expansion begins: 1380
  - Battle of Ankara: 28 July 1402
  - Fall of Samarkand: 1501
  - Fall of Herat: 1507

Area
- 1405 est.: 4,400,000 km^{2} (1,700,000 sq mi)

Population
  - 1405 est.: 49,000,000
- Currency: Tanka
Preceded by
Chagatai Khanate
Ilkhanate
Succeeded by
Khanate of Bukhara
Safavid Iran
Qara Qoyunlu
Aq Qoyunlu
Mughal Empire

The Timurid Empire was a late medieval Turco-Mongol, culturally Persianate, Muslim empire that dominated Greater Iran in the early 15th century, comprising modern-day Iran, Iraq, Afghanistan, much of Central Asia, the South Caucasus, and parts of contemporary Pakistan, North India, and Turkey. The empire had a syncretic culture and combined Turkic, Mongolic, and Persian influences, with the last members of the dynasty being regarded as "ideal Perso-Islamic rulers".

The empire was founded by Timur (r. 1370–1405), also known as Tamerlane, a warlord belonging to the Barlas tribe, which was of Mongol origin but had become Turkified in language and culture. He saw himself as the great restorer of the Mongol Empire of Genghis Khan, regarded himself as his heir, and associated closely with the Borjigin. Timur continued to have strong trade relations with Ming China and the Golden Horde, with Chinese diplomats like Ma Huan and Chen Cheng traveling west to his capital, Samarkand. The empire led to the Timurid Renaissance, particularly during the reign of Shahrukh Mirza (1405–1447) and his astronomer and mathematician son Ulugh Beg (1447–1449).

The ruling Timurid dynasty lost most of Persia to the Aq Qoyunlu confederation with the defeat and death of Abu Sa'id Mirza (1451–1469). However, members of the Timurid dynasty continued to rule smaller states, sometimes known as Timurid emirates, in Central Asia and Khorasan, with the reign of Husayn Bayqara (1469–1506) being regarded as the last flowering of the Timurid Renaissance in Herat. By 1507, Uzbeks under Shaybani Khan had conquered almost all of the surviving Timurid principalities, including Samarkand and Herat. In the 16th century, Babur, the Timurid prince of Ferghana (modern Uzbekistan), invaded Kabulistan (modern Afghanistan) and established a small kingdom there. After a final attempt to retake Samarkand in 1511–12, Babur turned to India and used this kingdom as a staging ground to invade the Delhi Sultanate in 1526 and established the Mughal Empire.

== Name ==
=== Turan ===
Timurid historian Sharaf al-Din Ali Yazdi states in his work Zafarnama (Book of victories) that the name of the Timur's state was Turan (Persian: توران). Timur personally ordered the name of his state as Turan be carved onto a rock fragment in Ulu Tagh mountainside (present-day Kazakhstan), known today as Karsakpay inscription. The original text, in particular, states:

... Sultan of Turan, Timur bey went up with three hundred thousand troops for Islam on the Bulgarian Khan, Tokhtamysh Khan...

=== Iran-o-Turan ===
The term Iran-o-Turan in a royal inscription of Ibrahim Sultan dated 826 AH (1423 CE) at Persepolis.

According to Beatrice Manz, in the literature of the Timurid era the realm was formally referred to as Iran-o-Turan (Persian: ایران و توران) in the same manner that the words 'Turk' and 'Tajik' were paired together. The border between the two areas was considered to be at the Oxus River. Both terms were concerned with imperial traditions, Iran being Persian and Perso-Islamic, and Turan with the steppe empires of the Turks and the Mongols. Joo Yup Lee explains that in Mongol and post-Mongol era "Turk" was used in contrast to "Tajik", with the former denoting Inner Asian nomadic groups and the latter referring to sedentary Iranian-speaking populations, in this usage, "Turk" could encompass Mongols and did not imply a non-Mongol or pre-Mongol Turkic descent or a Turkic identity like in the modern sense.

=== Mongol ===
Contemporary observers often described Timur's dominion using terminology associated with the Mongol imperial world. The historian Ibn Khaldun, who met Timur in Damascus in 1401, referred to him as "the sultan of the Mongols and Tatars" and described the language of his court as al-lisān al-Mughūlī ("the Mongol language").

The Castilian envoy Ruy González de Clavijo, who visited Samarkand in 1404, referred to Timur's realm as Mugalia ("Mongolia") in his embassy account.

=== Other ===
Mawarannahr (Arabic: ما وراء النهر) also appears as the name of the realm.

According to Shi'a authors, the ruling dynasty of the Timurids was called Gurkani (Persian: گورکانیان, Gurkāniyān). Gurkani means 'son-in-law', a title applied by Timur to help legitimise his rule as he could not claim Genghisid descent. To this end, he married a Genghisid princess, Saray Mulk Khanum.

== Genealogy ==
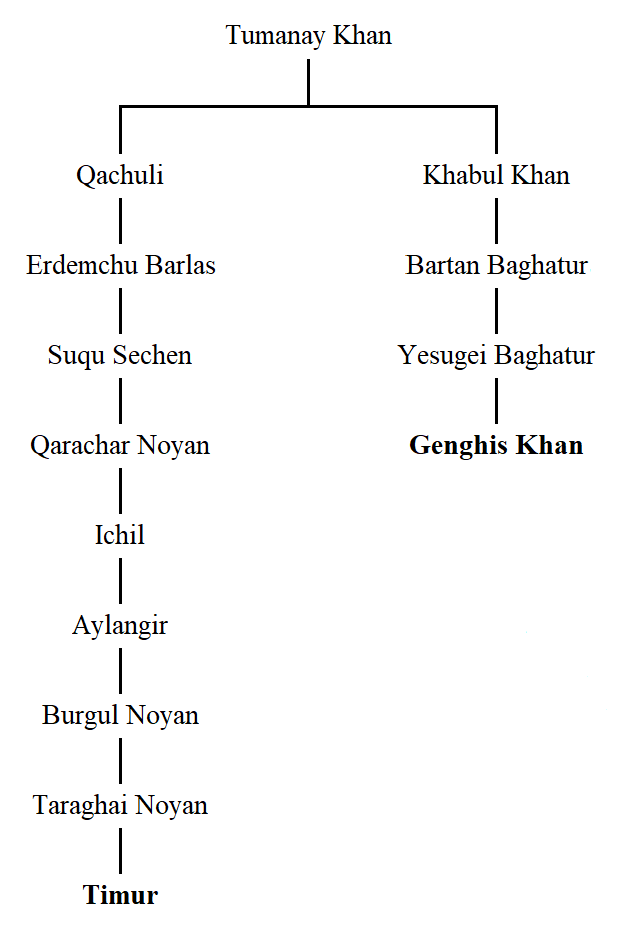
Genealogical relationship between Timur and Genghis Khan

The Timurid dynasty originated from the Barlas tribe, a Mongol tribal group of the Chagatai ulus; by lineage, Timur and the Timurids belonged to this Mongol tribe. Historian Peter Jackson writes that Timur was of unimpeachable Mongol ancestry. Timurid histories trace his paternal line to Tumbinai Khan, an ancestor of Genghis Khan, though no contemporary source directly links Timur himself to Genghis in the male line. His ancestor Qarachar Noyan is described as a commander under Genghis Khan in Transoxiana, and later genealogies emphasized this connection for legitimacy. The ancestry of Timur's mother, Tekina Khatun, remains uncertain and is reported differently in later sources.

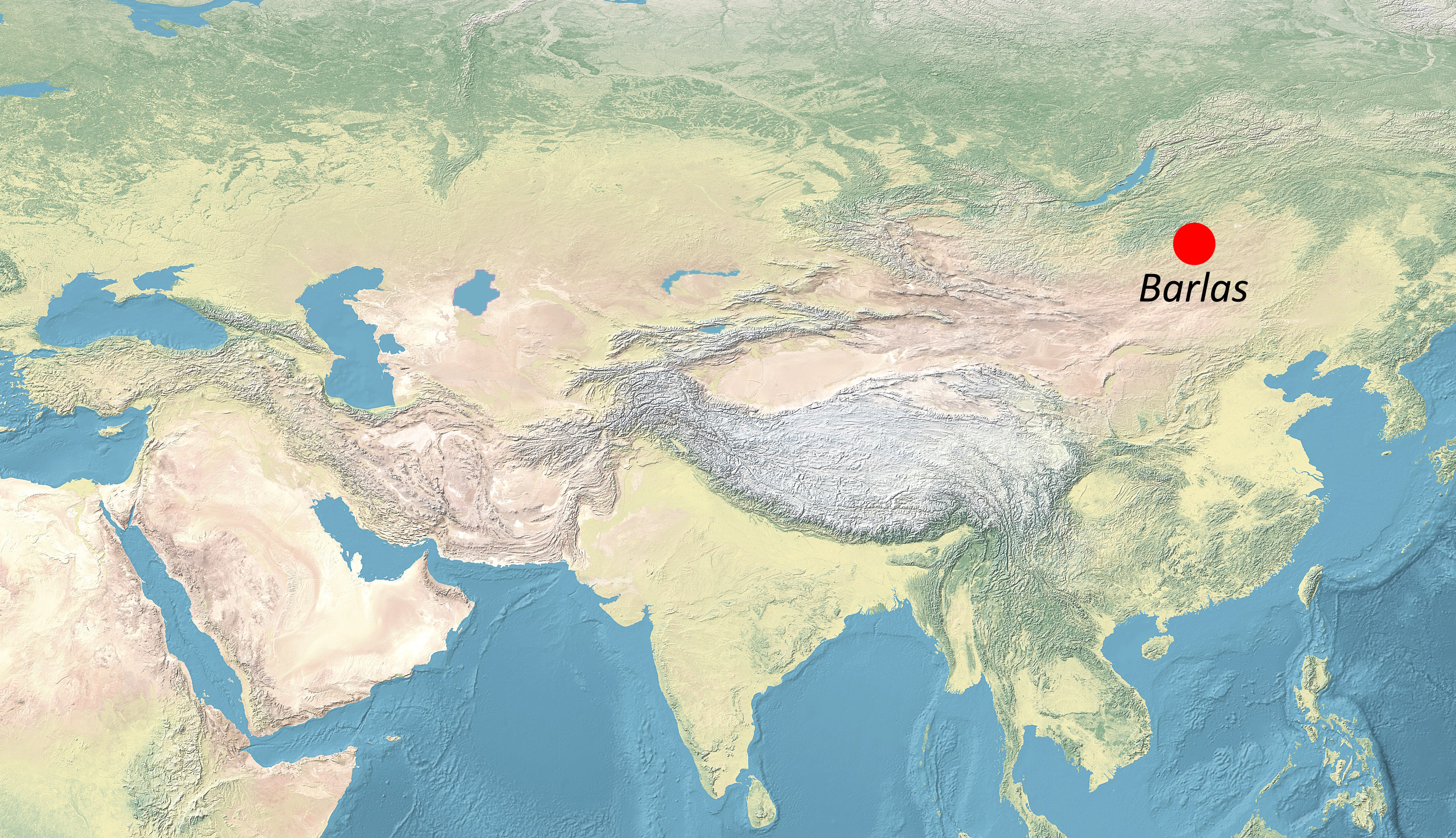
Original location of Timur's Mongol Barlas tribe

In the 17th-century memoir tradition known as the Tuzuk-e Tīmuri (also called the Malfuẓat-i Timuri), Timur is portrayed as recounting that his father told him their family descended from Abu al-Atrāk (lit. "Father of the Turks"). The same memoir presents the Timurids as descendants of Turk, son of Yafas (Japheth), who is described as the “Father of the Turks,” with Mughul and Tatar identified as descendants of Aljeh Khan within this genealogical chain. However, the Abu al-Atrak claim is preserved in the Tüzükat tradition, a work that does not appear in the historical record until 1637, when it was presented at the Mughal court of Shah Jahan. No copy of the purported original Chagatai manuscript is known to exist, and scholars regard the surviving Persian text as doubtful. Modern scholarship has questioned its authenticity, arguing that it cannot be regarded as a text authored by Timur himself. Moreover, major Timurid-era historians, including Yazdi and Shami, make no reference to the Tüzükat in their chronicles. It is treated as a later literary transmission rather than as documentary evidence of Timurid descent.

According to the Timurid ruler Ulugh Beg's 'Tārīkh-i arbaʿ ulūs (lit. 'History of Four Nations'), abridged as the Shajarat al-atrāk (lit. 'Genealogy of Turks'), It classified Mongols as 'Turks', while also praising their warrior spirit. Ulugh Beg included Yāfas (Japheth), Turk, Mughūl, Tātār and Ughūz in the genealogical record of the Genghisids and Timurids. However, in that era and post-Mongol Central Asia the term "Turk" frequently operated as a socio-political designation rather than a marker of strict genealogical descent. In this context, the Turk–Tajik distinction often referred to the contrast between steppe nomad and sedentary settled populations, not to fixed biological ancestry.

== History ==
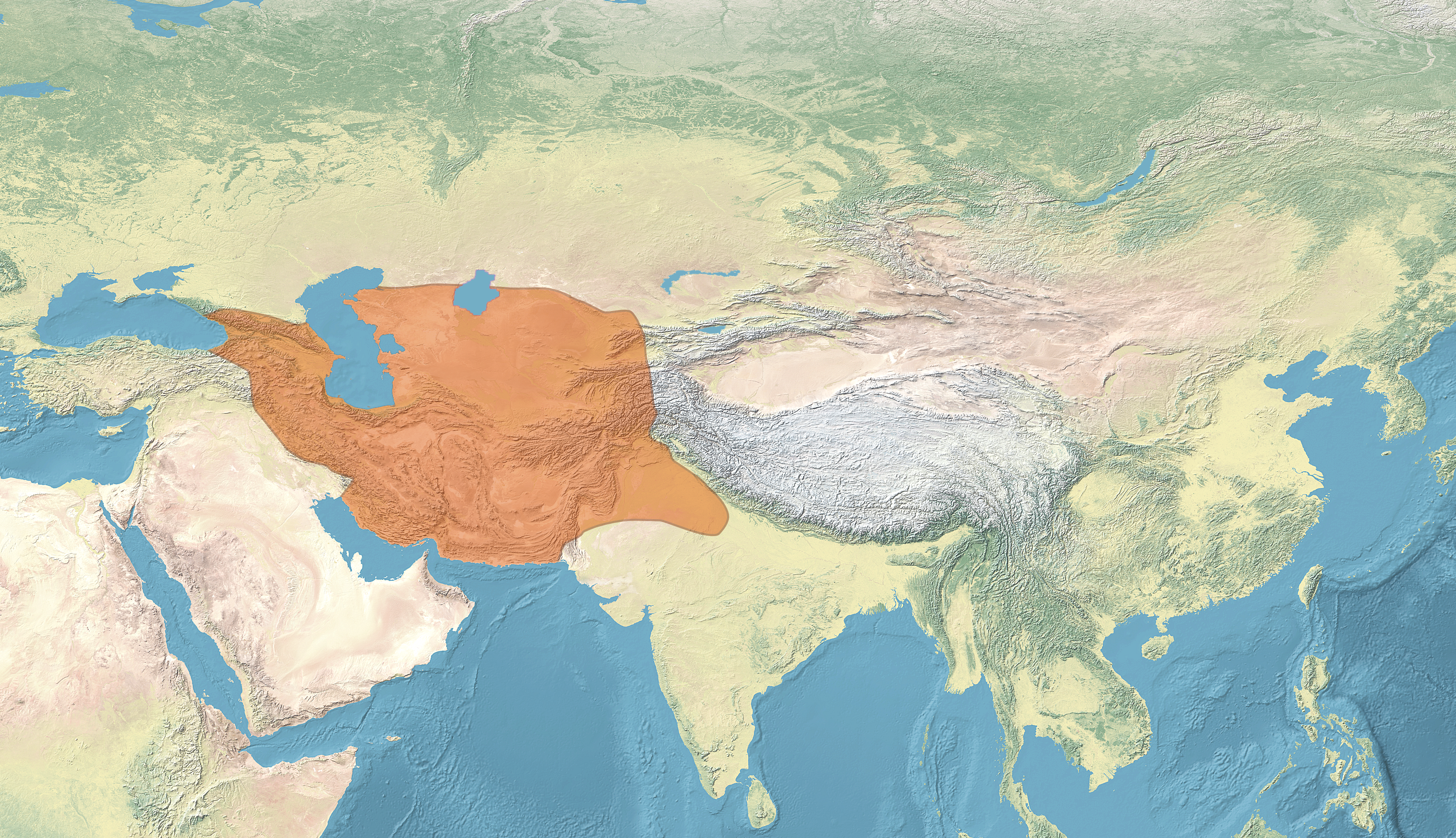
The Timurid Empire and contemporary polities, c. 1400

Timur conquered large parts of the greater Persian territories in Central Asia, primarily Transoxiana and Khorasan, from 1363 onwards with various alliances. He took Samarkand in 1366 and Balkh in 1369. He was recognized as ruler over them in 1370. Acting officially in the name of Suurgatmish, the Chagatai khan, he subjugated Transoxiana and Khwarazm in the years that followed. Already in the 1360s, he had gained control of the western Chagatai Khanate. While as emir he was nominally subordinate to the khan, in reality it was now Timur who picked the khans. These became mere puppet rulers. The western Chagatai khans were continually dominated by Timurid princes in the 15th and 16th centuries, and their figurehead importance was eventually reduced into total insignificance.

=== Rise ===
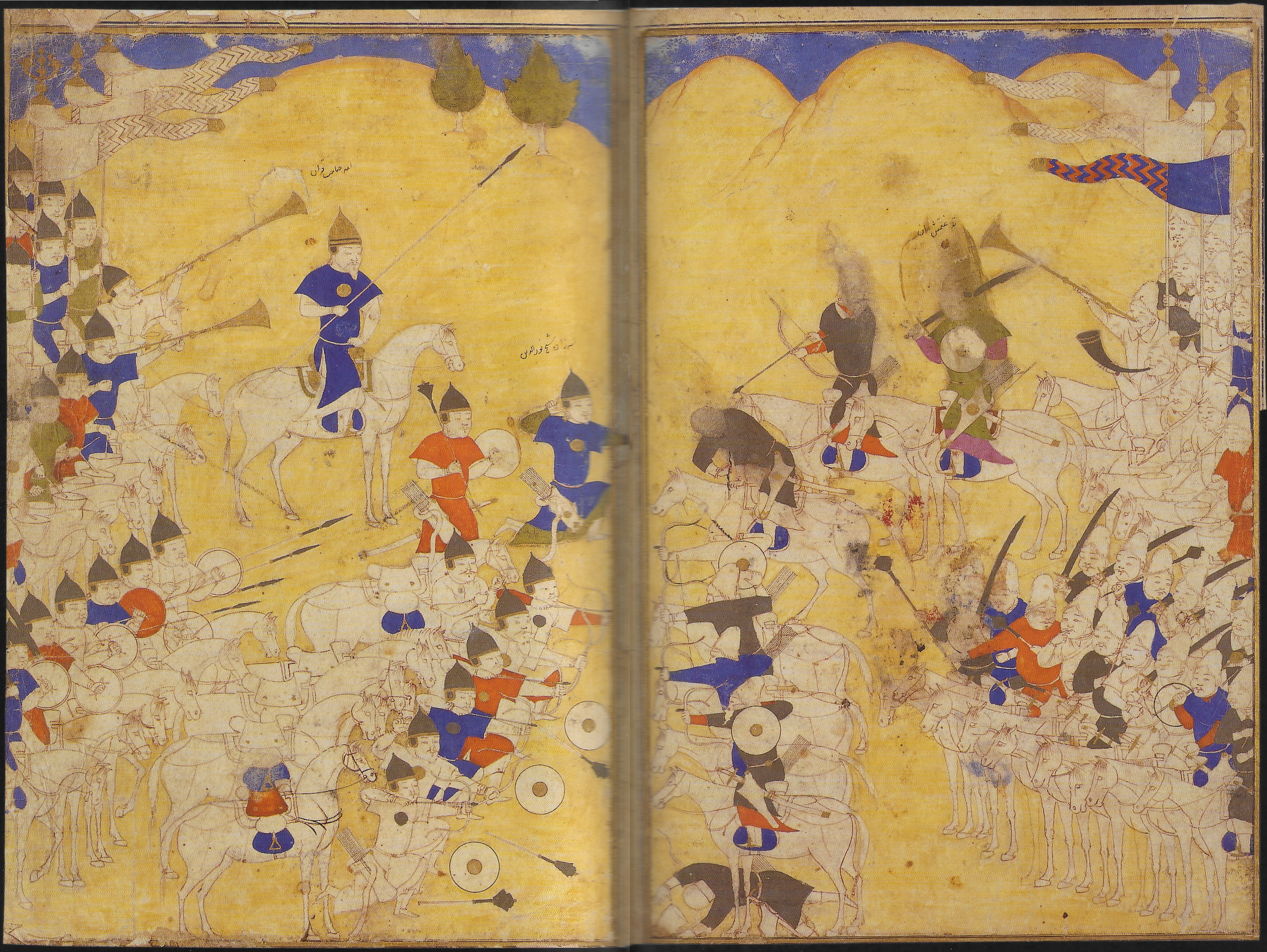
Battle between Timur (left) and Tokhtamysh (right). Topkapi H.2153, 1420–1440, possibly Herat.

Timur began a campaign westwards in 1380, invading the various successor states of the Ilkhanate. By 1389, he had removed the Kartids from Herat and advanced into mainland Persia where he enjoyed many successes. This included the capture of Isfahan in 1387, the removal of the Muzaffarids from Shiraz after the Battle of Shiraz (1393), and the expulsion of the Jalayirids from Baghdad. Tokhtamysh, the khan of the Golden Horde, was a major rival to Timur in the region. In 1394–1395, he triumphed over the Golden Horde, following his successful campaign in Georgia, after which he enforced his sovereignty in the Caucasus.

In 1398, the anarchy prevailing in the Delhi Sultanate had drawn Timur's attention. At the beginning of 1398, Timur sent an army led by his grandson Pir Muhammad to cross the Indus and attack Multan; the successful siege lasted six months. Later in the same year, Timur himself marched the main army across the Indus, and after destroying Tulamba joined Pir Muhammad. At Sutlej, he defeated the Khokhar chief Jasrat and then took the Loni and Bhatnair forts, seven miles northeast of Delhi. In December 1398, Timur engaged with the armies of Sultan Mahmud Shah and won. This led to his triumphal entry into Delhi, where he conducted a massacre but spared the craftsmen to be sent to Samarkand. He left Delhi in January 1399. During Timur's entry into India, he was faced by a sultanate that was already in decline due to the secession of its richest provinces.

Later in 1400–1401 he conquered Aleppo, Damascus and eastern Anatolia. He destroyed Baghdad in 1401, and in 1402 he defeated the Ottomans in the Battle of Ankara. This made Timur the most preeminent Muslim ruler of the time, as the Ottoman Empire plunged into civil war. Meanwhile, he transformed Samarkand into a major capital and seat of his realm.

=== Stagnation and decline ===
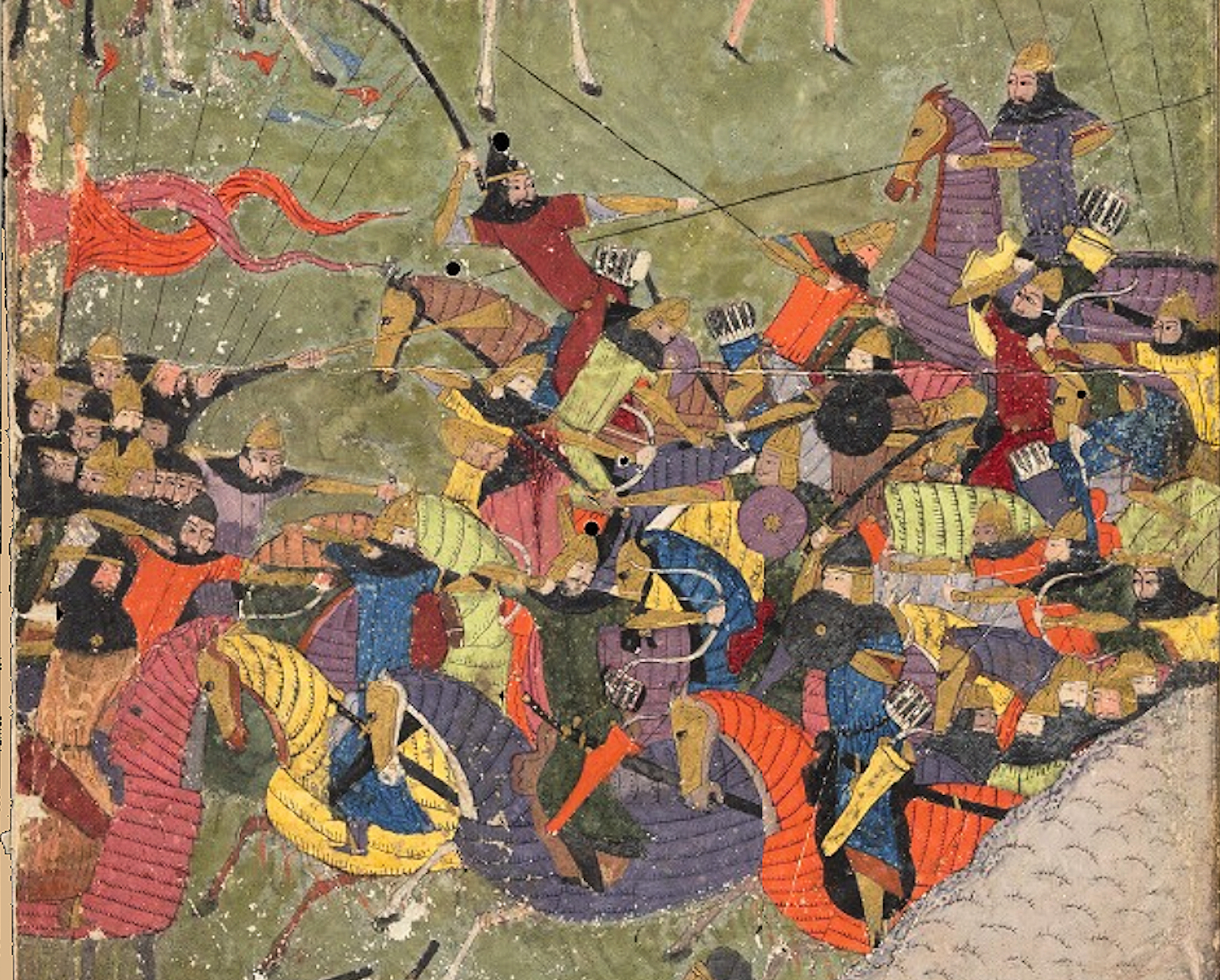
Contemporary depiction of the Qara Qoyunlu forces of Qara Iskandar (left) in battle against the Timurid forces of Ibrahim Sultan (right) in April 1429. Shahnama of Ibrahim Sultan (c.1430) frontispiece.

Timur appointed his sons and grandsons to the main governorships of the different parts of his empire, and outsiders to some others. After his death in 1405, the dynasty quickly fell into disputes and civil wars, effectively weakening themselves, and many of the governors became conclusively independent. Due to the fact that the Persian cities were desolated by wars, the seats of Persian culture were now in Samarkand and Herat, cities that became the centre of the Timurid Renaissance. The costs of Timur's conquests included the deaths of possibly 17 million people.

Shahrukh Mirza (r. 1405–1447), who eventually emerged victorious from the first civil war, ruled from Herat and dealt with the Qara Qoyunlu, who aimed to expand into Iran. But in the wake of Shahrukh's death, the Qara Qoyunlu under Jahan Shah drove the Timurids out to eastern Iran after 1447 and also briefly occupied Herat in 1458. Shahrukh was succeeded by his son Ulugh Beg, who was based in Samarkand and a famed patron of science being an astronomer and mathematician himself; his execution in 1449 after a revolt by his son Abdal-Latif Mirza plunged the empire into a civil war. Abu Sa'id Mirza (r. 1451–1469) briefly reunited most of the empire but after his defeat and execution in 1469 by Uzun Hasan, bey of the Aq Qoyunlu, the Timurid possessions were permanently divided. Mirza's sons, most notably Ahmad Mirza (r. 1469–1494), retained most of Transoxiana, while in Herat Husayn Bayqara (r. 1469–1506) proved to be the last of the great Timurids.

=== Fall ===
The power of Timurids declined rapidly during the second half of the 15th century, largely due to the Timurid-Mongol tradition of partitioning the empire as well as several civil wars. The Aq Qoyunlu conquered most of Iran from the Timurids, and by 1500, the divided and war-torn Timurid principalities had lost most of the former territory, and in the following years they were effectively pushed back on all fronts. Persia, the Caucasus, Mesopotamia, and Eastern Anatolia fell quickly to the Shi'ite Safavid Empire, secured by Shah Ismail I in the following decade. Much of the Central Asian lands was overrun by the Uzbeks under Shaybani Khan who conquered the key cities of Samarkand and Herat in 1501 and 1507 respectively, founding the Khanate of Bukhara, and bringing an end to the rule of the main Timurid branches.

=== Babur and the Mughal Empire ===
Babur, a Timurid prince exiled from Fergana after repeated conflicts with Shaybani Khan, established a new base at Kabul in 1504 which previously had been under the rule of his uncle Ulugh Beg II (r. 1461–1502). From Kabul, he invaded the declining Delhi Sultanate in 1526, and by the reign of his grandson Akbar, the Mughal Empire was firmly established in South Asia. The dynasty Babur founded is commonly known as the Mughal dynasty, although it was directly inherited from the Timurids. By the 17th century, the Mughal Empire ruled most of India but eventually declined during the following century. The Timurid dynasty finally came to an end when the remaining nominal rule of the Mughals was abolished by the British Empire following the Indian Rebellion of 1857.

== Culture ==
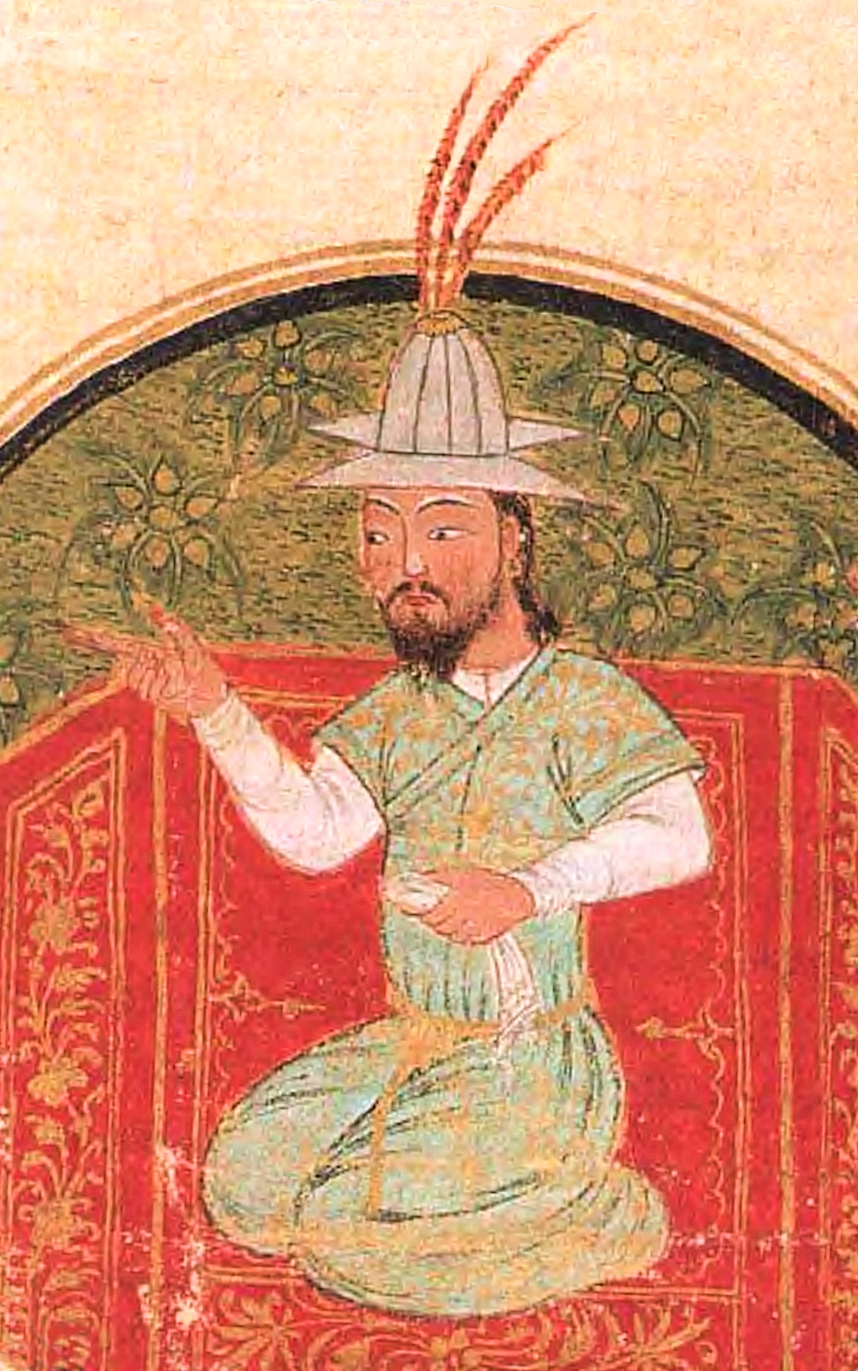
Earliest known portrait of Timur, commissioned right after his death in 1405–1409, by his grandson Khalil Sultan.

Although the Timurids hailed from the Barlas tribe, which was of Turkicized Mongol origin, they converted to Islam, and resided in Turkestan and Khorasan. Thus, the Timurid era had a dual character, reflecting both its Turco-Mongol origins and the Persian literary, artistic, and courtly high culture of the dynasty.

=== Language ===
During the Timurid era, Central Asian society was bifurcated, with the responsibilities of government and rule divided into military and civilian spheres along ethnic lines. At least in the early stages, the military was almost exclusively Turco-Mongolian, while the civilian and administrative element was almost exclusively Persian. The spoken language shared by all the Turko-Mongolians throughout the area was Chaghatay. The political organization hearkened back to the steppe-nomadic system of patronage introduced by Genghis Khan. The major language of the period, however, was Persian, the native language of the Tājīk (Persian) component of society and the language of learning acquired by all literate or urban people. Timur was already steeped in Persian culture and in most of the territories he incorporated, Persian was the primary language of administration and literary culture. Thus the language of the settled "diwan" was Persian, and its scribes had to be thoroughly adept in Persian culture, whatever their ethnic origin. Persian became the official state language of the Timurid Empire and served as the language of administration, history, belles lettres, and poetry. The Timurid variety of Persian also served as the language of diplomacy between the Timurids and the Ming dynasty, as evidenced by Huihuiguan zazi, a Persian-Chinese glossary compiled in Ming China. The Chaghatay language was the native and "home language" of the Timurid family, while Arabic served as the language par excellence of science, philosophy, theology and the religious sciences.

=== Literature ===
==== Persian ====
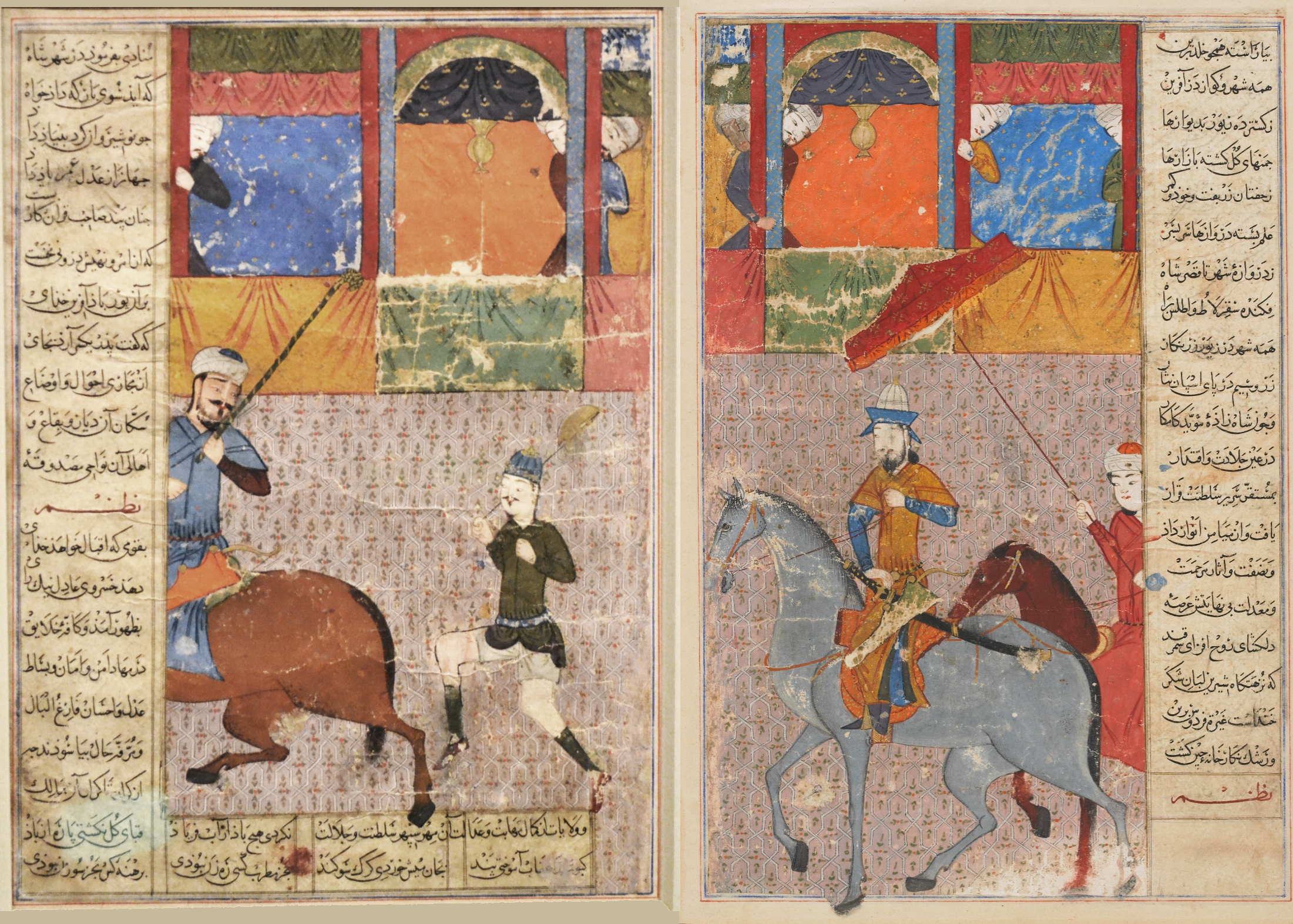
Shah Rukh (right) makes a triumphal entrance in Samarkand in September 1394, after Timur names him Governor of the city, Zafarnama (1436)

Persian literature, especially Persian poetry, occupied a central place in the process of assimilation of the Timurid elite to the Perso-Islamic courtly culture. The Timurid sultans, especially Shah Rukh and his son Ulugh Beg, patronized Persian culture. Among the most important literary works of the Timurid era is the Persian biography of Timur, known as Zafarnāmeh (Persian: ظفرنامه), written by Sharaf al-Din Ali Yazdi, which itself is based on an older Zafarnāmeh by Nizam al-Din Shami, the official biographer of Timur during his lifetime. The most famous poet of the Timurid era was Nūr ud-Dīn Jāmī, the last great medieval Sufi mystic of Persia and one of the greatest figures in Persian poetry. Hearing of the Persian culture of the Timurid empire, the Ottoman sultan Mehmed II encouraged those under his patronage to engage with the models provided by Persian cultural centers like Shiraz and Tabriz, and in particular by the Timurid court of Husayn Bayqara (r. 1469–1506) in Herat. Mehmed II was determined to foster the creation of a new language and literary-artistic culture for his burgeoning court in Istanbul.

In addition, some of the astronomical works of the Timurid sultan Ulugh Beg were written in Persian, although the bulk of it was published in Arabic. The Timurid prince Baysunghur also commissioned a new edition of the Persian national epic Shāhnāmeh, known as Shāhnāmeh of Baysunghur, and wrote an introduction to it. The Persian poet 'Ismat Allah Bukhari taught poetry to Khalil Sultan, grandson of Timur. According to T. Lenz:

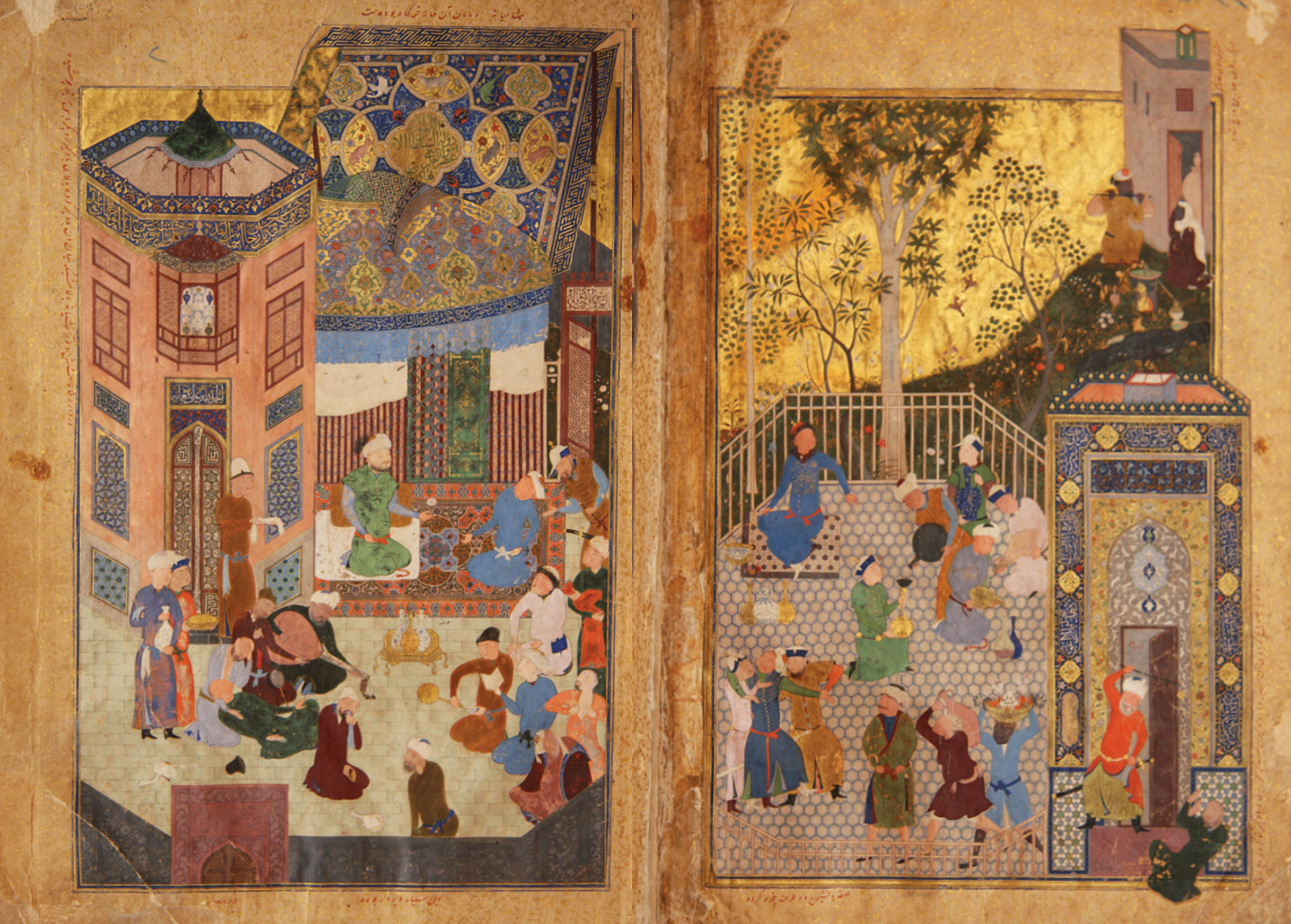
Frontispiece from the Cairo Bustan, depicting Sultan Husayn Bayqara and his court. Herat, c. 1488

It can be viewed as a specific reaction in the wake of Timur's death in 807/1405 to the new cultural demands facing Shahhrokh and his sons, a Turkic military elite no longer deriving their power and influence solely from a charismatic steppe leader with a carefully cultivated linkage to Mongol aristocracy. Now centered in Khorasan, the ruling house regarded the increased assimilation and patronage of Persian culture as an integral component of efforts to secure the legitimacy and authority of the dynasty within the context of the Islamic Iranian monarchical tradition, and the Baysanghur Shahnameh, as much a precious object as it is a manuscript to be read, powerfully symbolizes the Timurid conception of their own place in that tradition. A valuable documentary source for Timurid decorative arts that have all but disappeared for the period, the manuscript still awaits a comprehensive monographic study.

Following the publication of Mukhtar al-Ikhtiyar, a legal manual that was used until the twentieth century, by the head magistrate of Bayqara in Herat, Persian was used as a language of jurisprudence (fiqh) under the late Timurids.

During the reign of sultan Husayn Bayqara, the Irshad al-zira'a, a Persian agricultural treatise, was written by Qasim b. Yusuf Abu Nasiri. Based on in-depth, first-hand conversations with farmers, the Irshad al-zira'a, covered the agricultural development of Herat and included minor architectural suggestions for gardens.

==== Chagatai ====
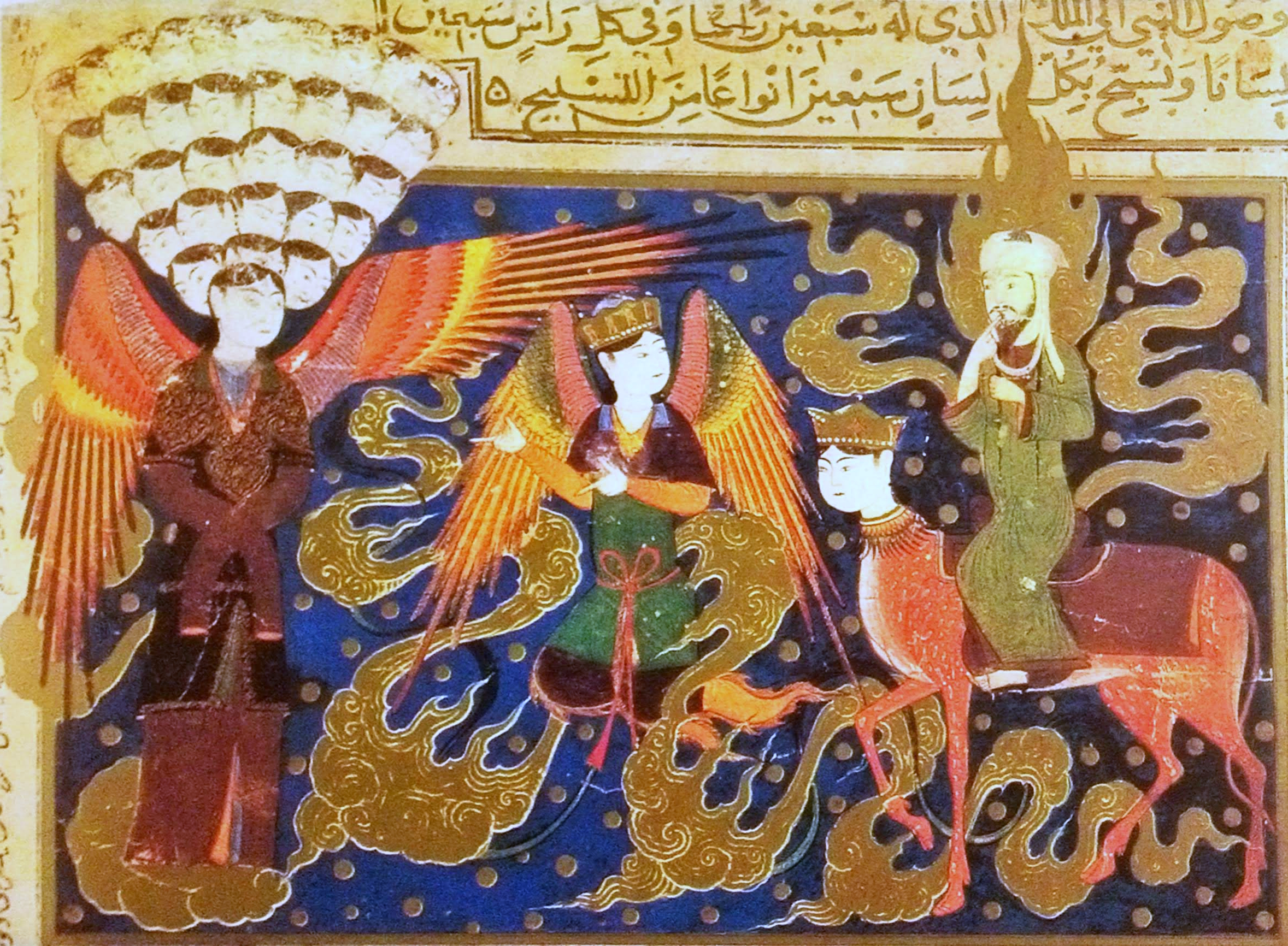
The Mira‘j nama was commissioned by Shahrukh and composed in 1436 in Chaghatai Turkic using the Uighur script, c.1436 in Herat. The multi-headed deity is inspired from the Chinese Buddhist Avalokitesvara.

The Timurids also played a very important role in the history of Turkic literature. Based on the established Persian literary tradition, a national Turkic literature was developed in the Chagatai language. Chagatai poets such as Mīr Alī Sher Nawā'ī, Husayn Bayqara, and Zāhiruddīn Bābur encouraged other Turkic-speaking poets to write in their own vernacular in addition to Arabic and Persian. Nawa’i's work, predominantly based on Persian designs, was an attempt to create a culture that was specific to the Turkophone audience. The Bāburnāma, the autobiography of Bābur (although being highly Persianized in its sentence structure, morphology, and vocabulary), as well as Mīr Alī Sher Nawā'ī's Chagatai poetry are among the best-known Turkic literary works and have influenced many others.

Despite being spread throughout Central and South Asia, Chaghatai Turkic remained the junior partner to Persian, and was not promoted systemically in the Timurid Empire to replace Persian. Chaghatai texts were found at Sultan Husayn Bayqara's court, but the Timurid chancery and court continued to use Persian. Although the body of Turkic literature produced in Central Asia increased during the Timurid era of the fifteenth century—partially as a result of Mir 'Ali Shir Nawa'i's independent efforts toward the end of the Timurid century—it was still dwarfed by the Persian literary output that the Timurid elite supported. There are no surviving Turkic historical work from the Timurids, although two Turkic histories seem to have been written during the Timurid period before the flowering of the Timurid historiography in Persian.

=== Art ===
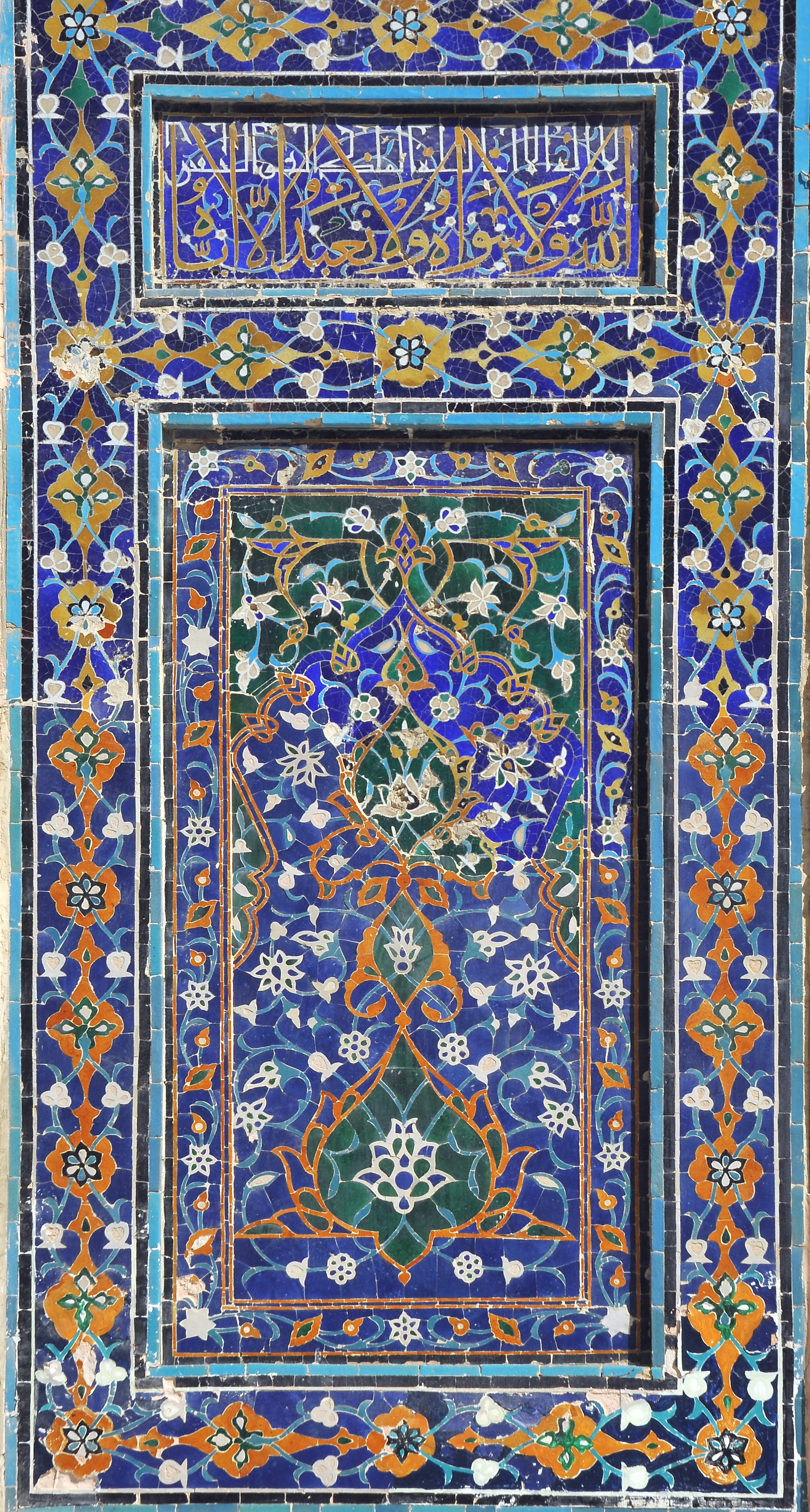
Tumurid mo'araq mosaic. Ulugh Beg Madrasa, Samarkand, 1417-1421

The golden age of Persian painting began during the reign of the Timurids. During this period – and analogous to the developments in Safavid Iran – Chinese art and artists had a significant influence on Persian art. Timurid artists refined the Persian art of the book, which combines paper, calligraphy, illumination, illustration and binding in a brilliant and colourful whole. The Mongol ethnicity of the Chaghatayid and Timurid khans was the source of the stylistic depiction of Persian art during the Middle Ages. These same Mongols intermarried with the Persians and Turks of Central Asia, even adopting their religion and languages. Yet their simple control of the world at that time, particularly in the 13th–15th centuries, reflected itself in the idealised appearance of Persians as Mongols. Though the ethnic make-up gradually blended into the Iranian and Mesopotamian local populations, the Mongol stylism continued well after and crossed into Asia Minor and even North Africa.

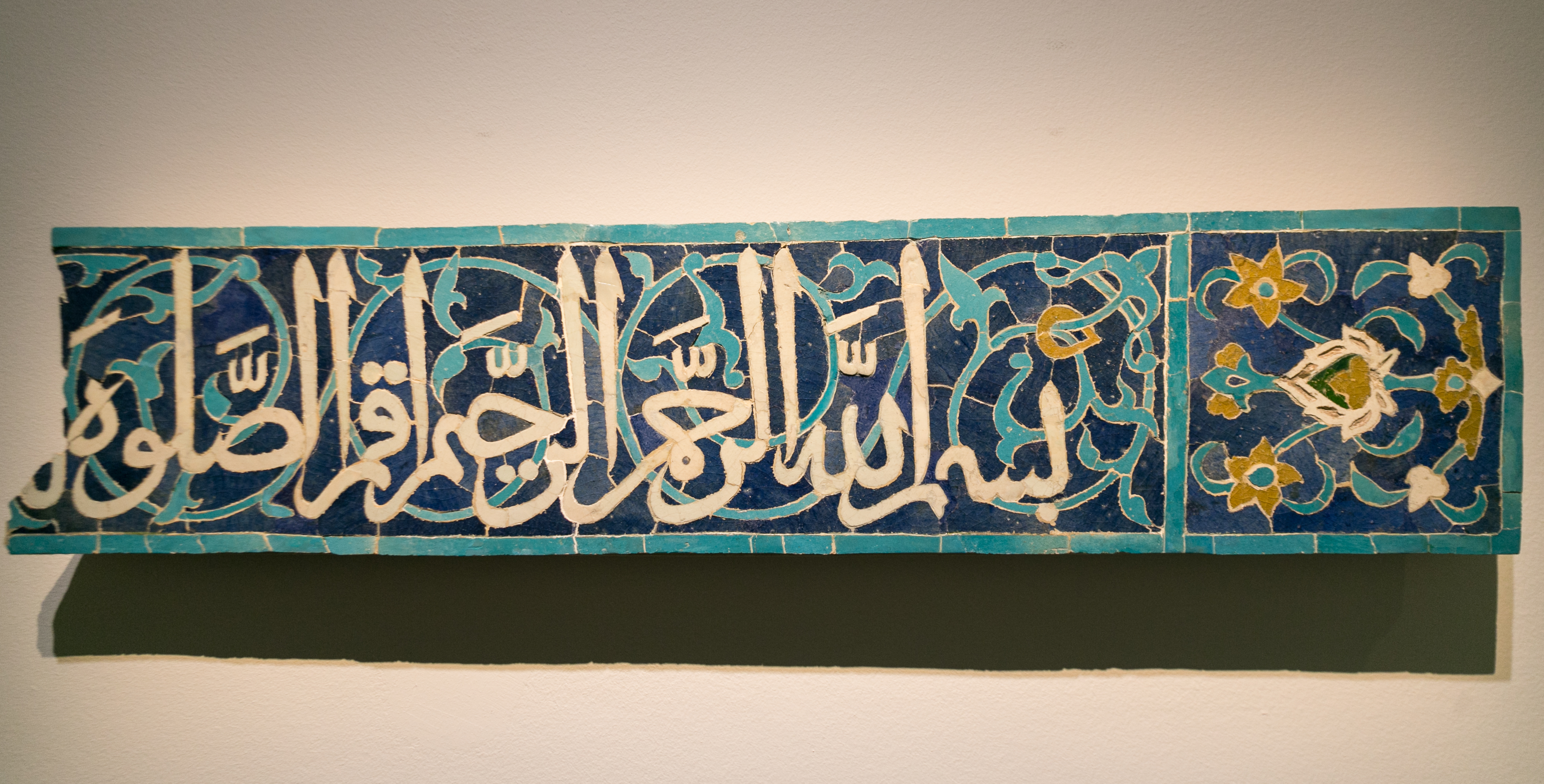
Timurid deocrative element, Central Asia or Iran, 1375–1400

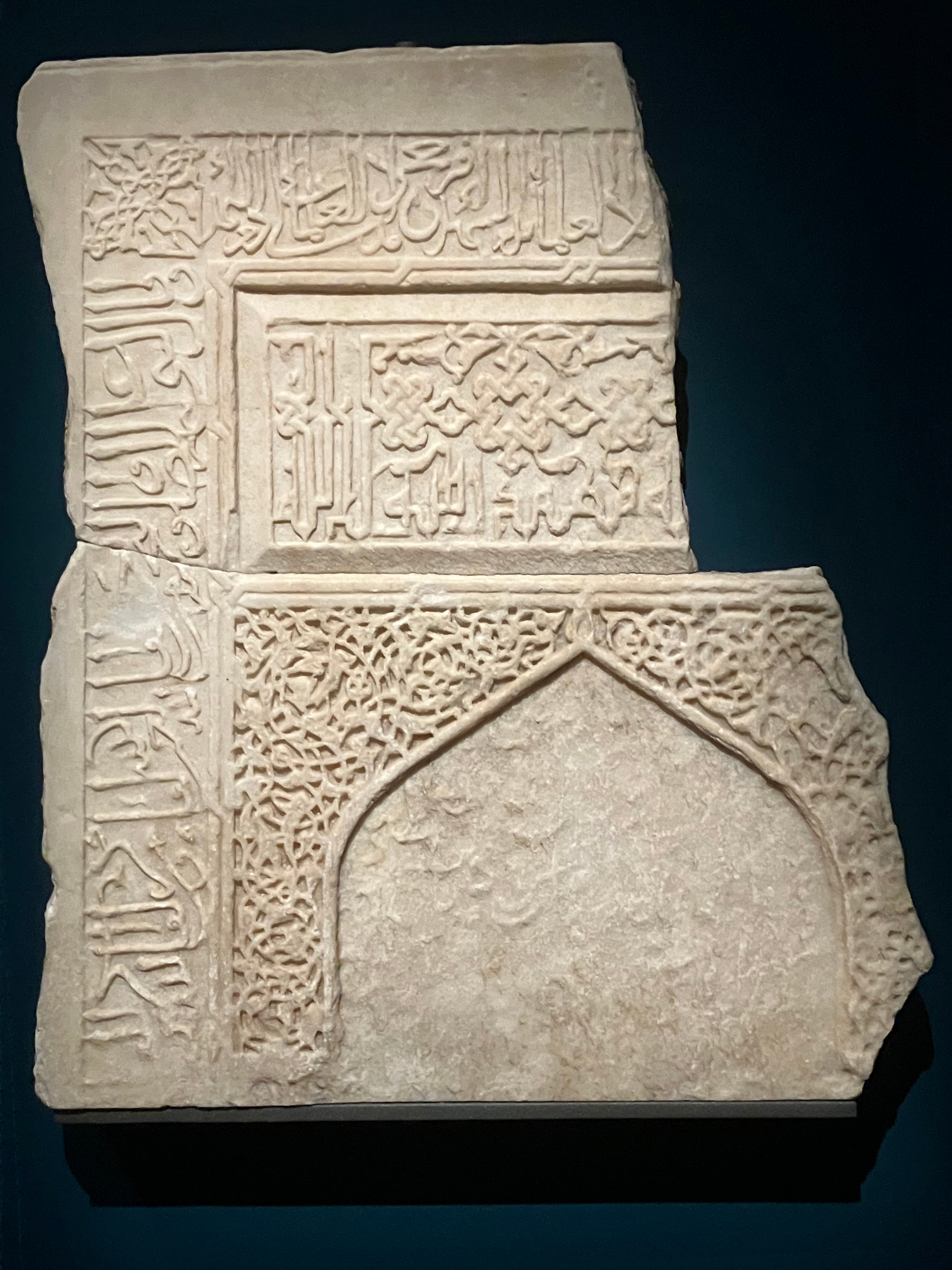
Fragmentary tombstone in the shape of a mihrab. Samarkand, 1385–1400. Louvre Museum OA 4080.

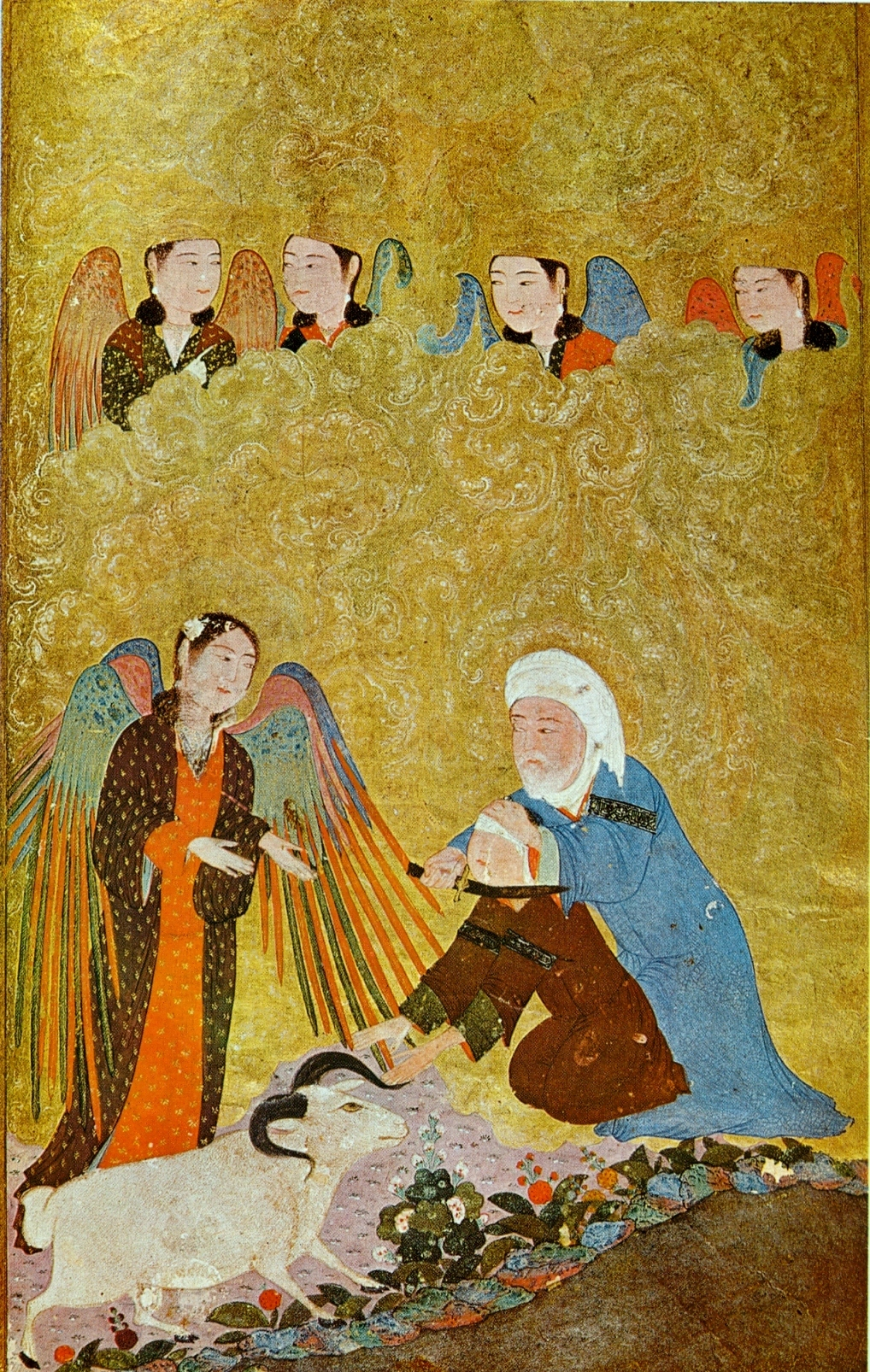
The Angel Hinders the Offering of Isaac. Anthology of Sultan Iskandar, Shiraz 1410.

=== Architecture ===
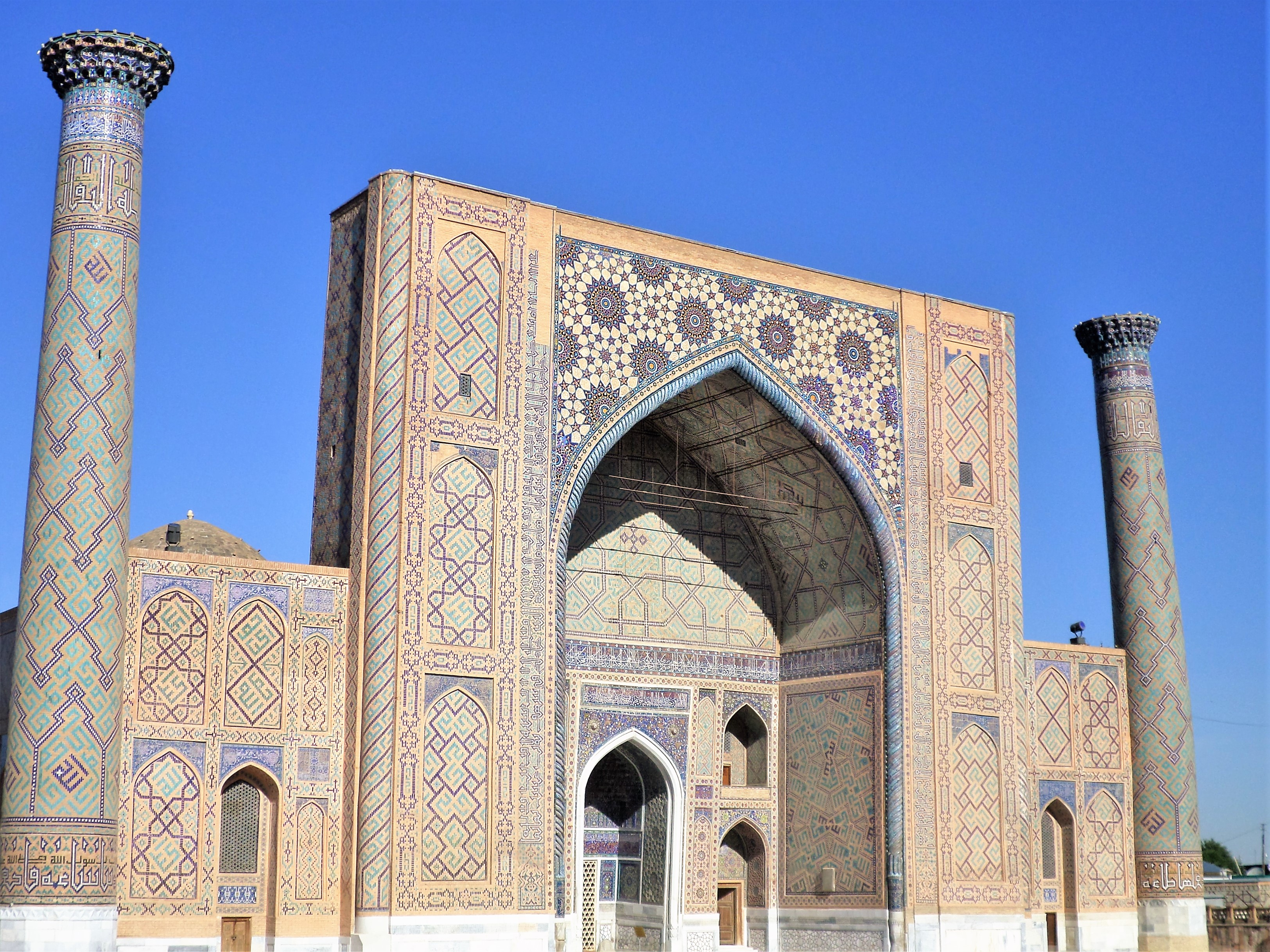
Façade of the Ulugh Beg Madrasa at the Registan in Samarkand (1417–1420). The two other buildings of the Registan date from the Khanate of Bukhara in the 17th century.

Timurid architecture elaborated on the existing tradition of Iranian and Central Asian architecture that had grown up to the preceding Ilkhanid period. The Timurid style is distinguished by large-scale buildings, layouts with strong axial symmetry, prominent double-shelled domes in bulbous form, rich exterior tile decoration (in both tile mosaic and banna'i techniques), and sophisticated interior vaulting. Timur used various tools for legitimisation, including urban planning in his capital, Samarkand. One of the earliest surviving Timurid monuments is the Mausoleum of Khoja Ahmed Yasawi in present-day Kazakhstan (1389–1399). Many of the major imperial monuments of the era are found in Samarkand, including the Gur-i Amir Mausoleum (completed c. 1404), the Bibi-Khanym Mosque (1399–1404), the Shah-i Zinda necropolis (late 14th to early 15th centuries), and the Ulugh Beg Madrasa (1417–1420). The most important patron of architecture in the 15th century was Gawhar Shad, whose constructions demonstrate a high quality of decoration and increasingly elaborate structural elements, with important examples being her religious and funerary complex in Herat and the mosque of Gawhar Shad in Mashhad. The power and prestige of the empire, along with the scale of its patronage, ensured that its architectural style was a major subsequent influence in many regions. In Iran, it was inherited by the Safavids, while in the east it was inherited by the Mughals (of Timurid origin) on the Indian subcontinent, where it was blended with Indo-Islamic influences to create the Mughal style. Further west, it also influenced early Ottoman architecture.

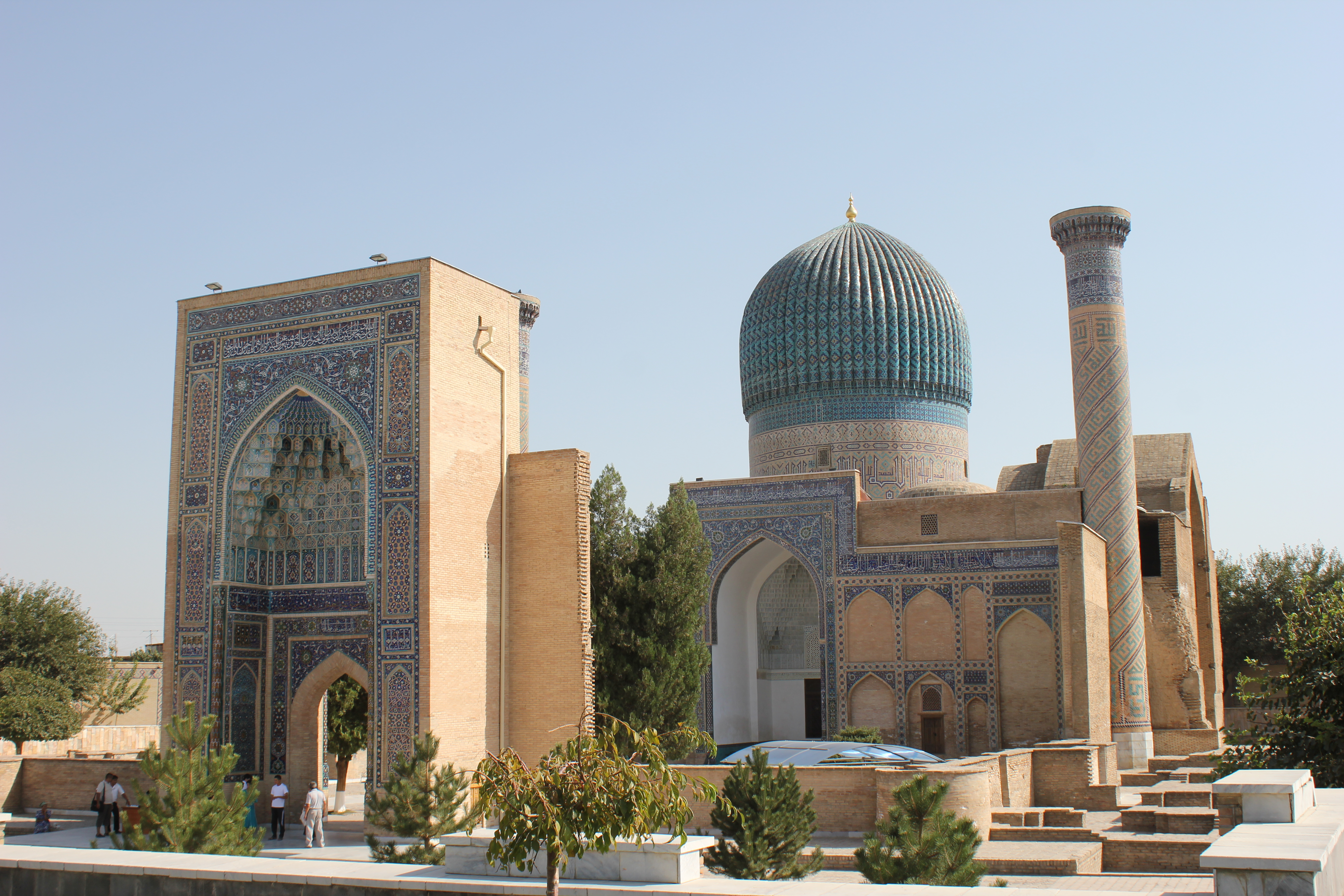
Gur-e Amir, "Tomb of the King": Timur's tomb in Samarkand

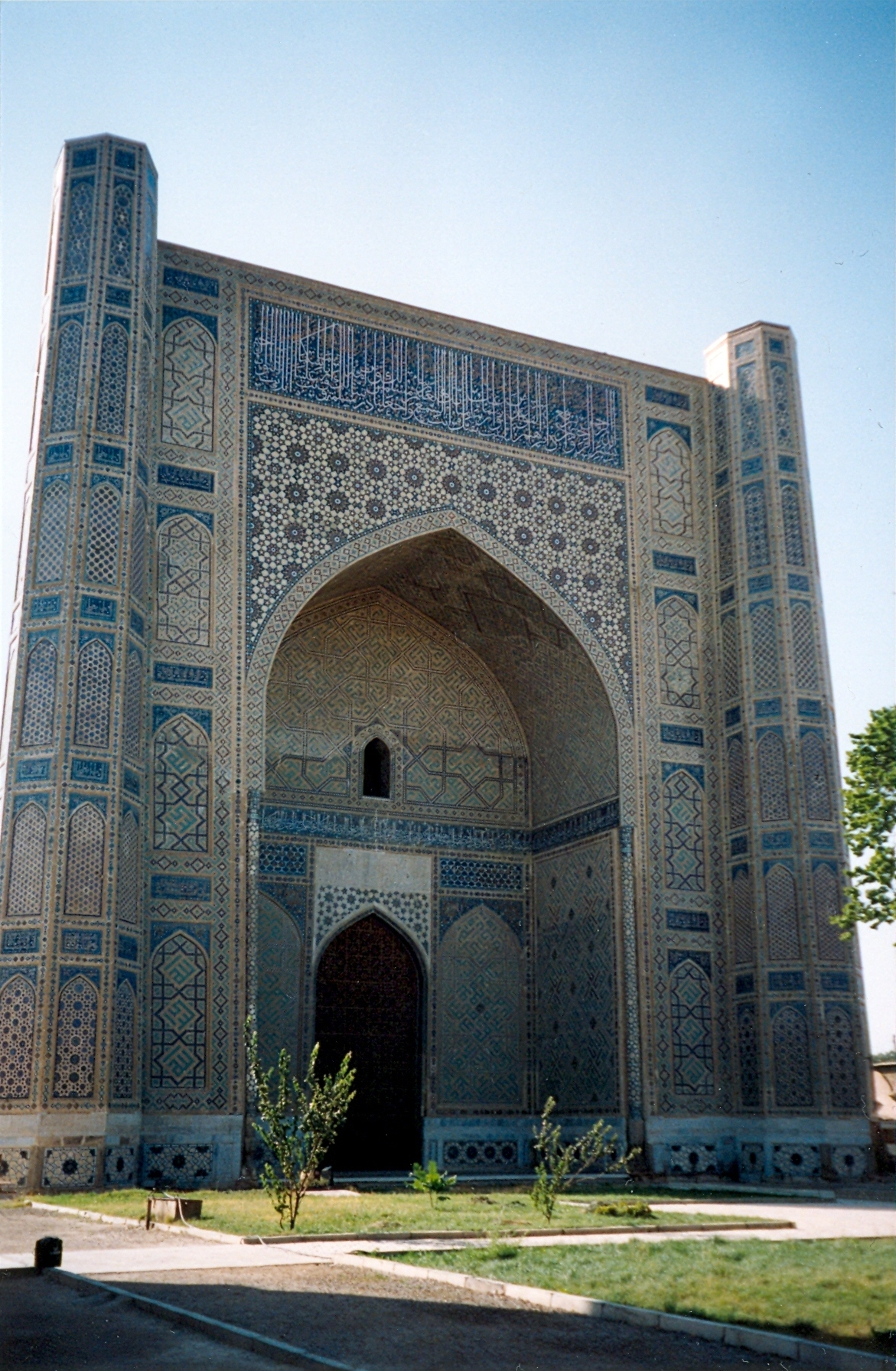
Façade of the Bibi Khanum Mosque in Samarkand

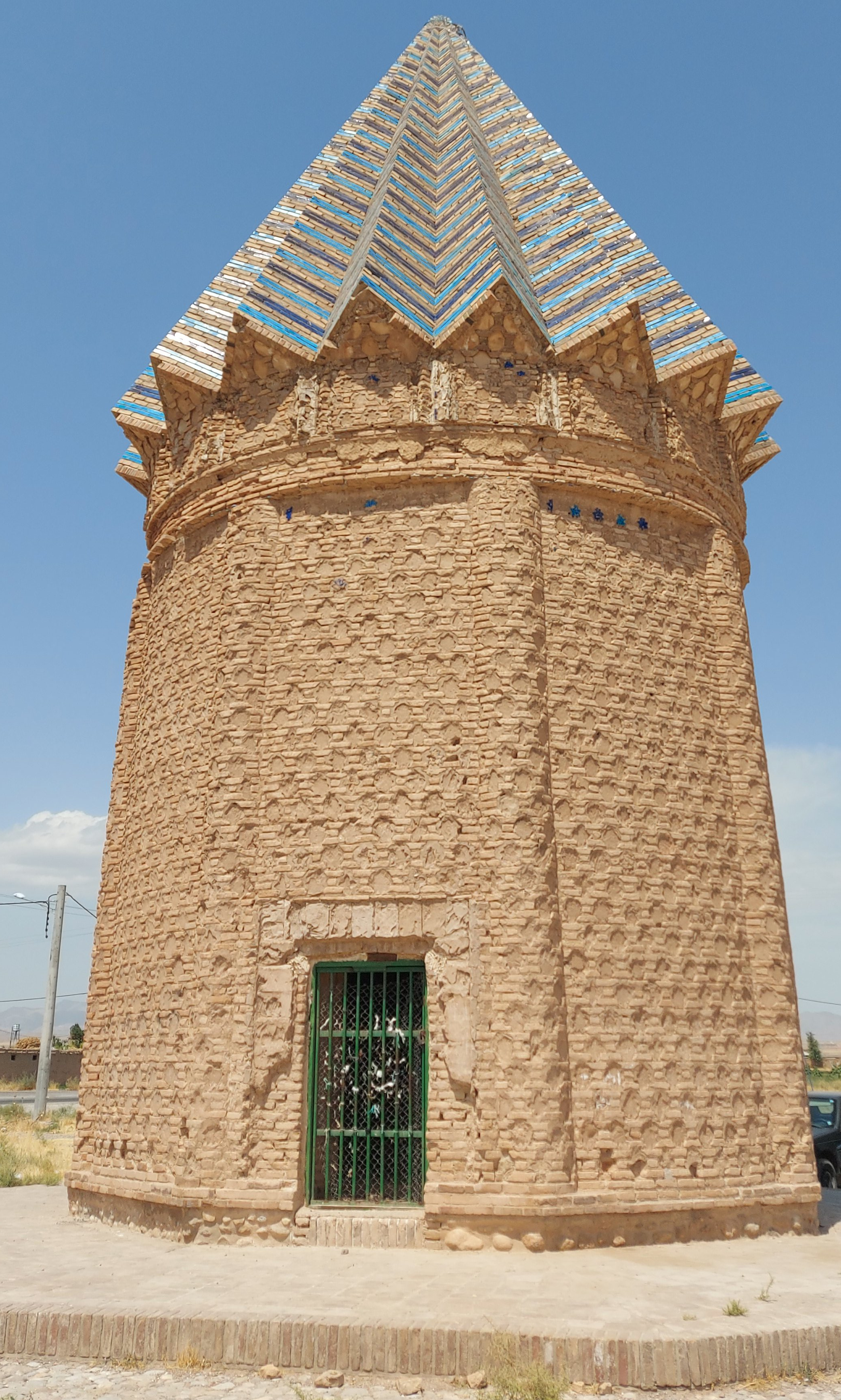
Akhangan Tower, the tomb of Gawhar Shad's sister Gowhartāj, in Akhangan (northeastern Iran)

== Military ==
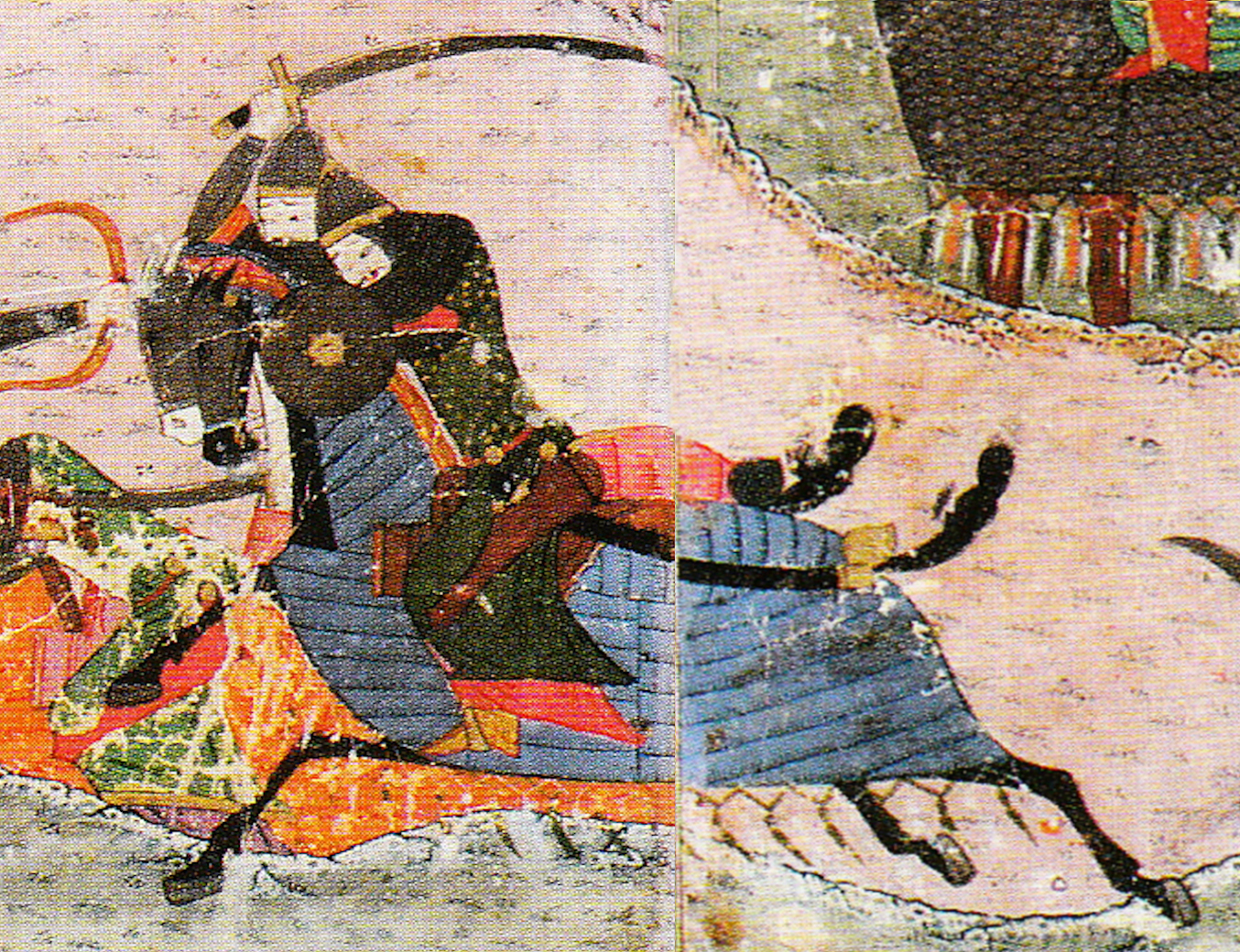
Timurid cavalry. Zafarnama of 1436

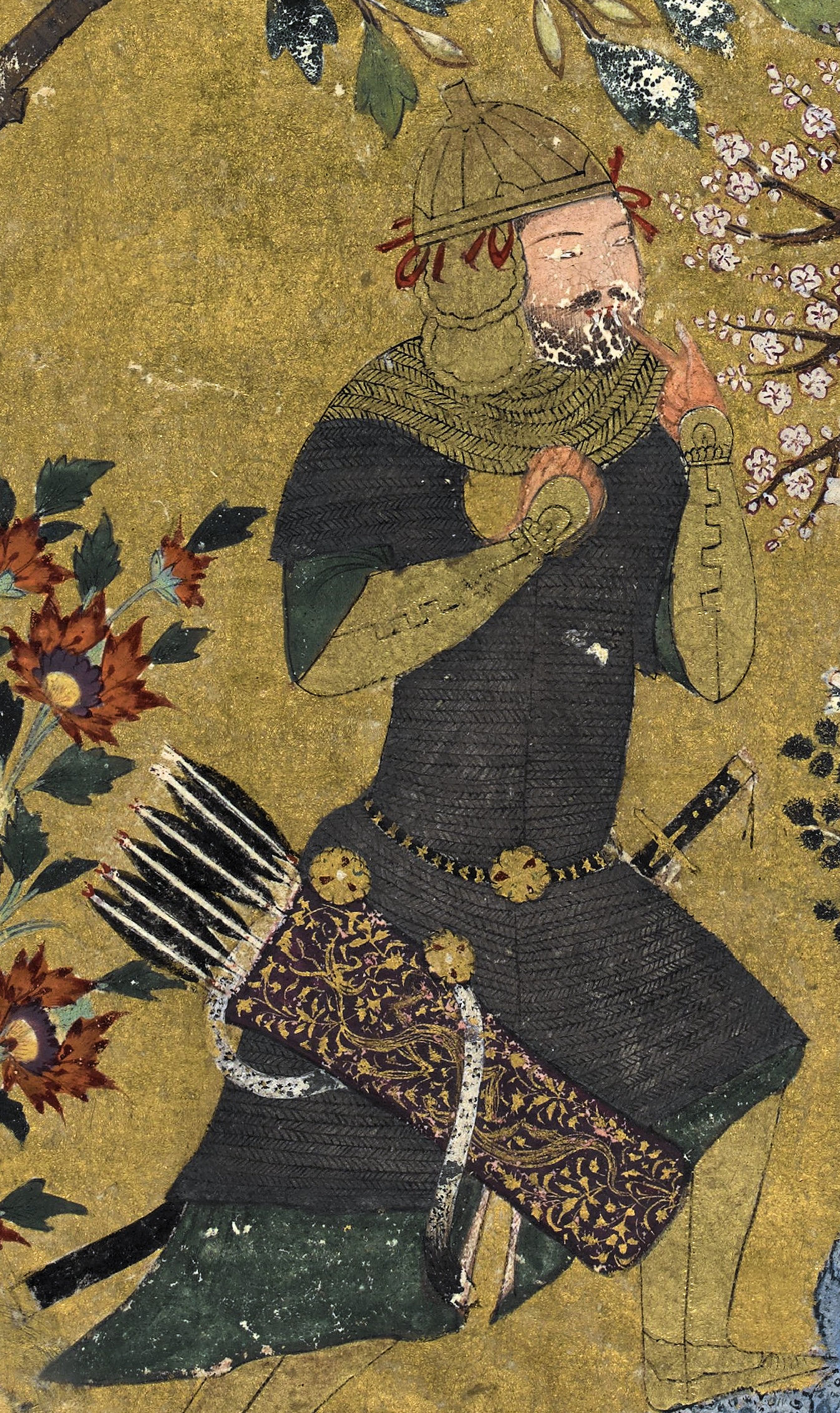
Timurid soldier (Epic poems, 1410)

In the Chagatay translation of Ali Yazdi's Zafarnama, Timur's army is called a "Chagatay army" (Čaġatāy čerigi). Potentially a reference to the Chagatai Khanate.

Timur’s army consisted almost entirely of cavalry, and its main military force was the Chagatai people. The Chagatais were descendants of Turkicized Mongol tribes that had belonged to the Chagatai ulus of the Mongol Empire and originated from the troops assigned to Chagatai by his father Genghis Khan. By the mid-14th century, this ulus included tribes of Mongol and Mongolic origin such as the Barlas, Arlat, Suldus, Jalayir, and Dughlat, as well as later formations such as the Qara'unas. Over time, the ulus split into eastern and western parts. The latter, located in Transoxiana, became the primary environment for the formation of Timur’s military and political support. Timur was able to reconcile the Chagatai tribes and transform them into a highly disciplined military force, devoted to their charismatic leader.

The Timurids relied on the conscription of troops from settled populations. They were unable to fully subjugate many other nomadic tribes. This was not because of lack of military power as Timur succeeded in defeating them, but rather because he was unwilling to integrate autonomous tribes into his power structure due to his centralised governance. The tribes were too mobile to effectively suppress and the potential loss of their autonomy was unattractive to them. Hence, Timur was unable to secure the loyalty of the tribes, and his hold over them did not survive his death.

The role of slave soldiers such as the ghilman and mamluks was considerably smaller in Mongol-based armies like the Timurids, as compared to other Islamic societies.

The Timurids had a contingent called the nambardar levy, which mostly consisted of native Iranians, and occasionally scholars and fiscal administrators. The nambardar were used to bolster the size of the army for large expeditions.

== Society ==
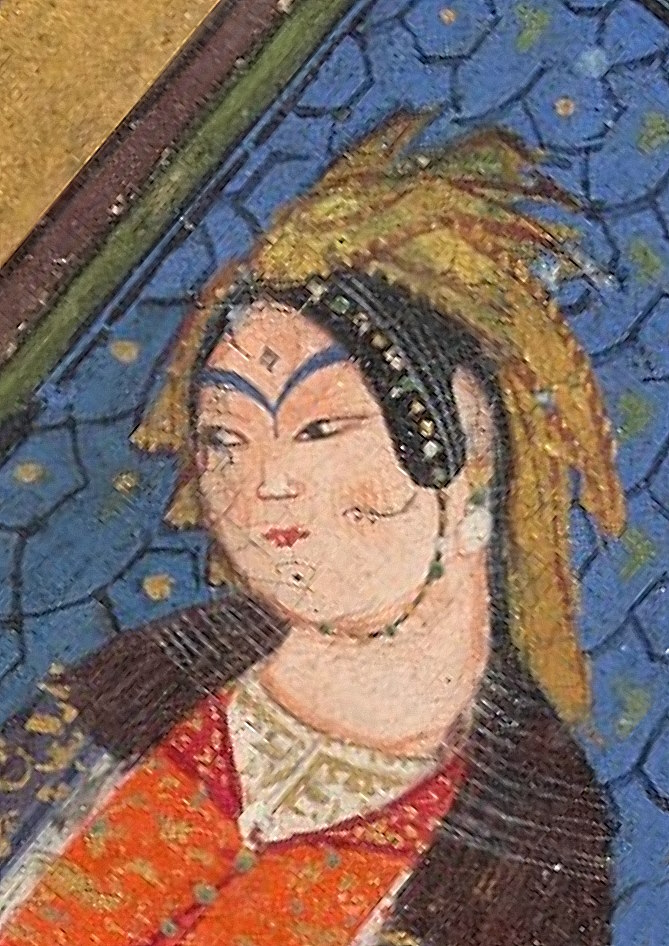
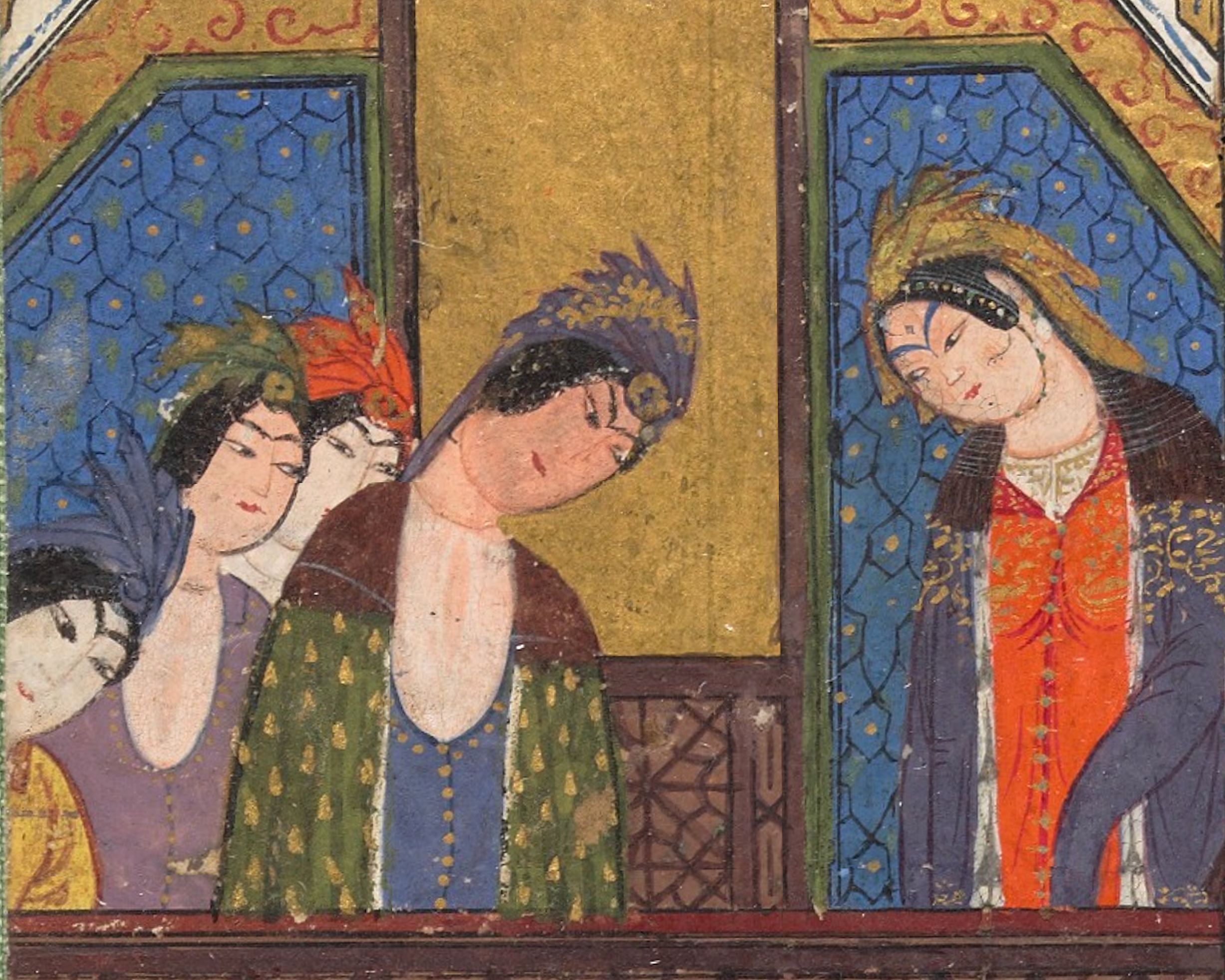
The Queen of Ibrahim Sultan, on a balcony with her ladies (Bodleian Library MS. Ouseley Add. 176 f.240a), painted 1430-1435.

Queens and ladies of the court appear to have had a rather prominent role in Timurid society. Several depictions of them are known in Timurid miniatures. Timur's Queen Saray Mulk Khanum, by birth a princess of Moghulistan, daughter of Qazan Khan ibn Yasaur and a direct descendant of Genghis Khan, appears to have had a prominent role. She was Timur's confidante and one of his closest advisers, and she apparently wielded great influence over her husband and in the Empire. Saray Mulk Khanum also sometimes acted as regent during Timur's absences from Samarkand as a result of his western campaigns and wielded great authority at Court. As Timur's chief consort, Saray additionally held the title of "Great Empress" similar to the title held by Genghis Khan's chief wife, Börte. The Spanish ambassador, Ruy Gonzáles de Clavijo, who was sent by Henry III of Castile to visit Timur's court in 1405, called Saray, "The Grand Khanum". Saray Mulk Khanum also sometimes joined military campaigns. In May 1394, Saray, along with Timur's other wives, joined her husband with the ughruq in the Armenia and Transcaucasia camapigns. During the Indian campaign, Saray Mulk Khanum and her son Ulugh Beg accompanied Timur as far as Kabul, from which they returned to Samarkand in August 1398.

Two generations later, the queen of Ibrahim Sultan, son of Shah Rukh, was prominently depicted in a palace scene, appearing on a balcony with her ladies in a Shahnamah (Bodleian Library MS. Ouseley Add. 176), painted in 1430–1435.

== Symbols of the state ==
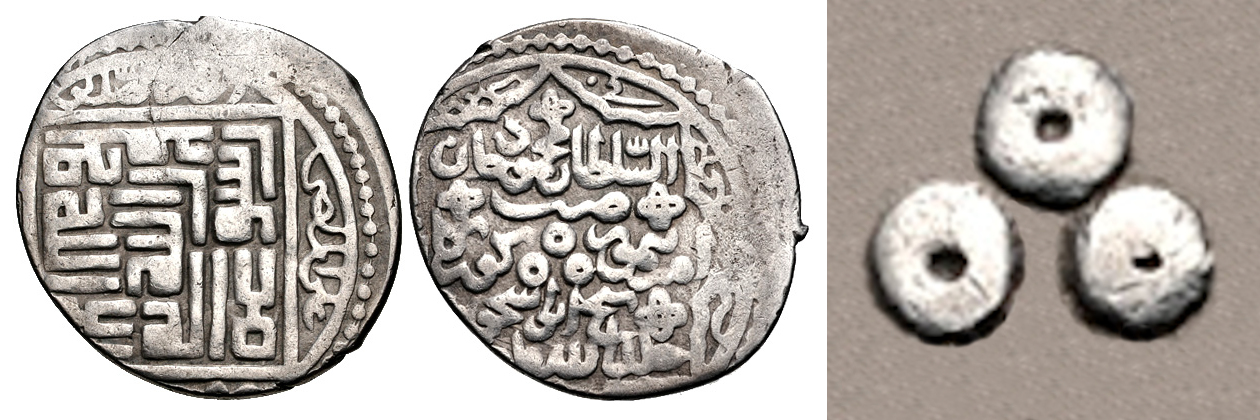
Coinage of Timur with "three annulets" symbol (at the center of the reverse side). Shaykh abu-Ishaq (Kazerun) mint. Undated, c. AH 795–807; AD 1393–1405.

The main symbol of the Timurids is thought to have been the so-called "sign of Timur", which is three equal circles (or rings) arranged in the form of an equilateral triangle. Ruy de Clavijo (d. 1412), the ambassador of the king of Castile to the court of Timur in 1403, and the Arab historian, Ibn Arabshah described the sign, which was encountered on the seal of the Amir, as well as on Timurid coins. Timur himself issued several coins bearing the "three annulets" tamgha on the reverse.

It is not known for certain what meaning the triangular sign had, but according to Clavijo, each circle meant a part of the world (of which there were three before 1492), and the owner of the symbol was their ruler. The sign consisting of circles perhaps tried to illustrate Timur's nickname of "Sahib-Qiran" (the ruler of three benevolent planets). According to Ruy de Clavijo, the emblem adopted by Timur was composed of "three circlets" arranged into the shape of a triangle:

The special armorial bearing of Timur is the three circlets set thus to shape a triangle, which same it is said signifies that he Timur is lord of all three quarters of the world. This device Timur has ordered to be set on the coins that he has stuck, and on all buildings that he has erected (…) These three circlets which, as said, are like the letter O thrice repeated to form a triangle, further are the imprint of Timur's seal, and again by his special order are added so as to be seen patent on all the coins stuck by those princes who are become tributary to his government.

— Ruy González de Clavijo (d. 1412)

Often images of abstract symbols (tamga) on coins were accompanied by the Persian expression "Rāstī rustī" (Persian: راستى رستى), which can be translated as "In rectitude lies salvation". It is also known that the same expression was used in flags as well.

=== Flag ===
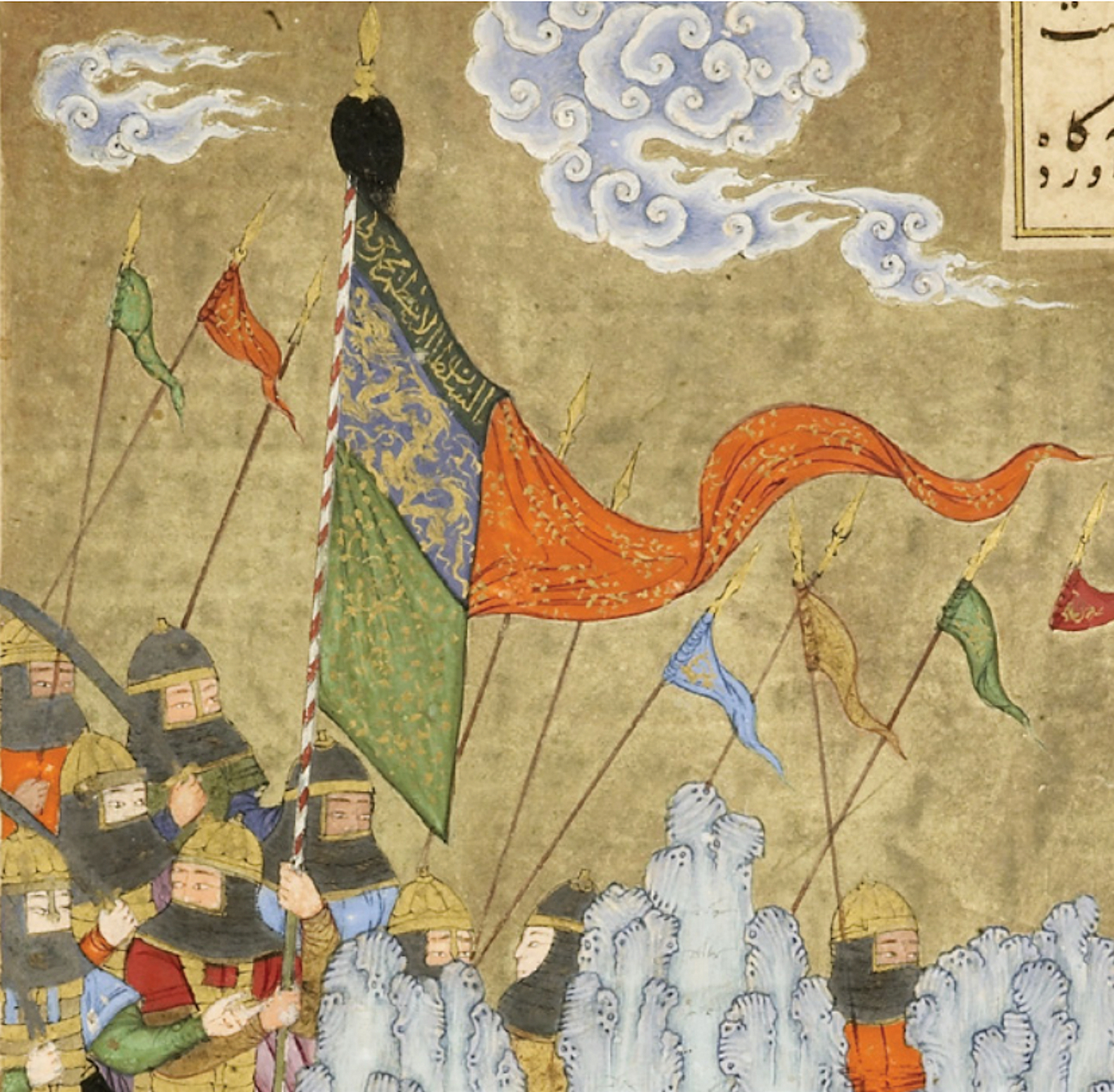
Flag in the name of Timurid prince Muhammad Juki, from a copy of the Shahnama of Firdawsi, probably Herat, c. 1440.

Standards with a golden crescent are mentioned in different historical sources. Some miniatures depict the red banners of Timur's army, and it is thought that Timur generally used red banners, probably for visibility, with variable cut-outs, to which may have been added the tail of a horse or yak (the Mongol tugh), topped with the crescent of Islam. During the Indian campaign, a black banner with a silver dragon was used. Before the campaign to China, however, Timur ordered the depiction of a golden dragon on the army's banners.

There is little certainty about the actual flag of the Timurid Empire. Yuka Kadoi studied the possibility that the "brown or originally silver flag with three circles or balls" in the Catalan Atlas could be associated with the "earlier dominions of the Timurid Empire", specifically referencing a flag raised over the city of Camull (the modern city of Khamil in Xinjiang).

Yuka Kadoi also noted the existence of Timur's umbrella detail with three-dots decorative motif, as well as some contemporary coins from Samarkand which also have the three circles as a motif. Beyond that, the evidence remains scant and ambiguous, but according to Kadoi "one can reasonably conclude that the flag with a tri-partite motif had a certain iconographic association with the Timurid Empire". For other authors, the grey, silver or black flag with the three red crescent moons, which is seen all over Mongol dominions in eastern Asia in the Catalan Atlas (dated to 1375), is simply intended as the flag of the Empire of the Great Khan (Yuan China).

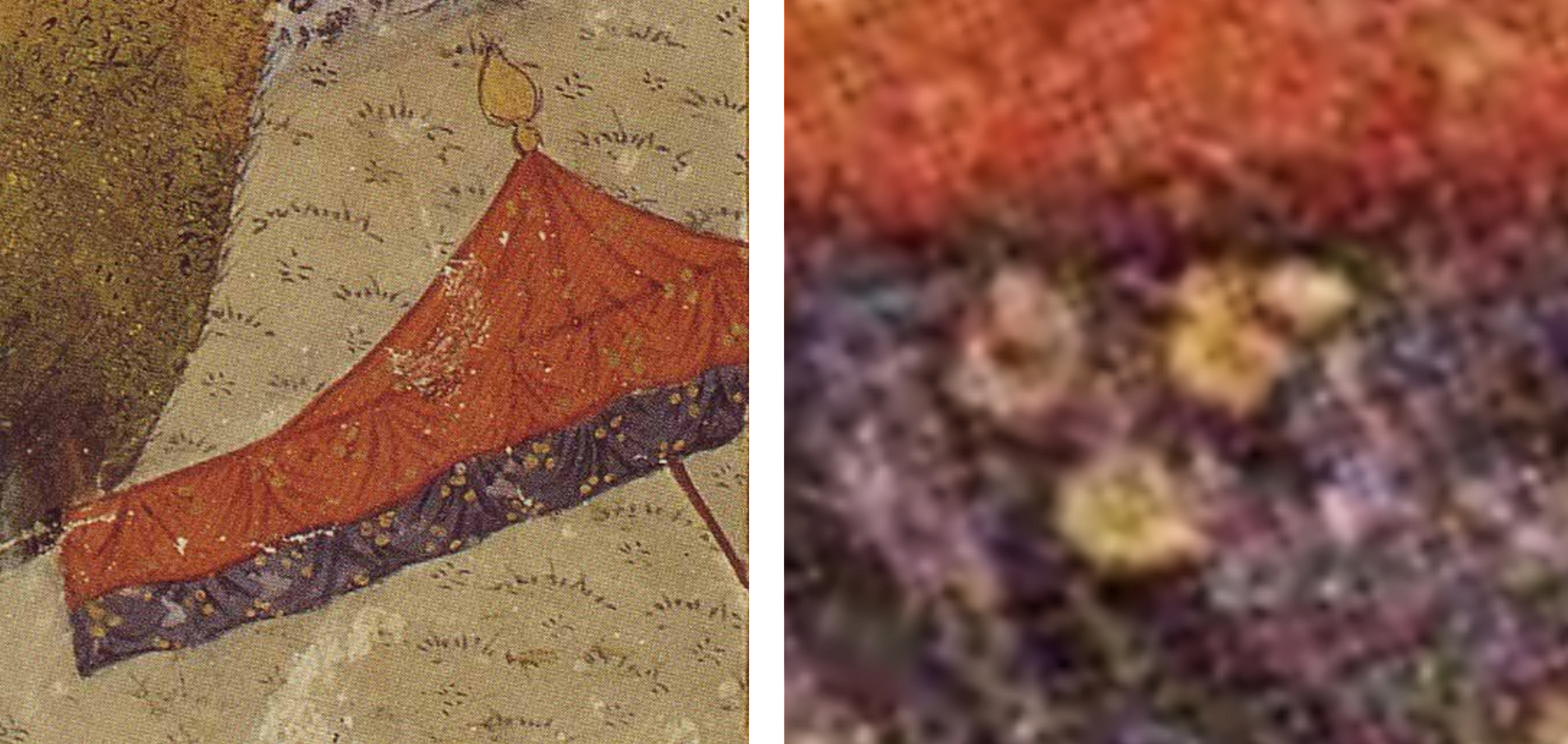
Timur's umbrella, with three golden dots symbols. Zafarnama of Sharaf al-Din ‘Ali, Yazdi. Shiraz, AH 839, 1436 CE (detail)

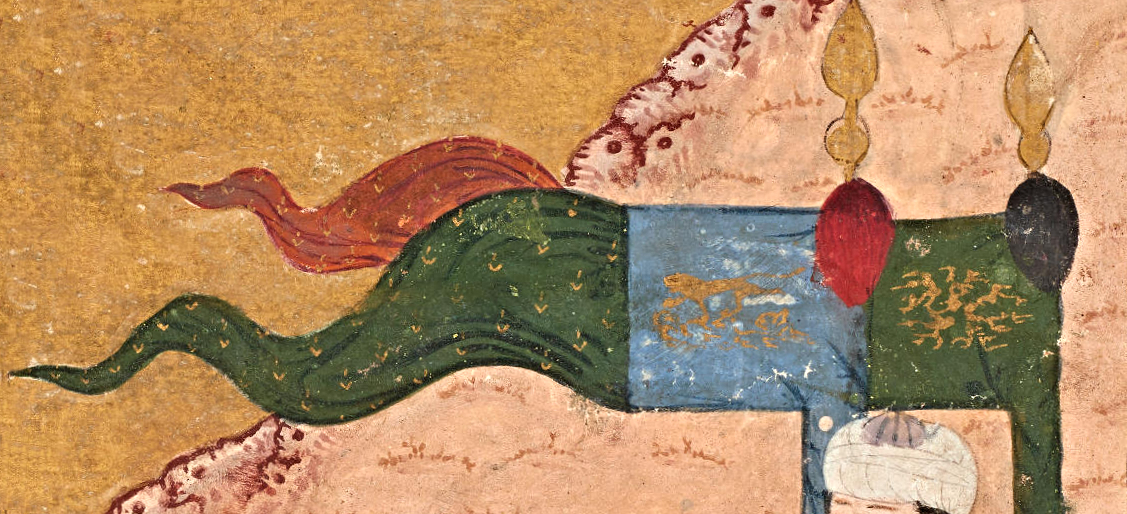
Timurid flags in the Campaign against China after Timur's death in 1405. Zafarnama of Ibrahim Sultan (1436)

Banner type used by Timur during his campaigns, according to Pierre Lux-Wurm

== See also ==
- Hazara people
- History of Iran
- List of Mongol states
- List of Sunni Muslim dynasties

== Sources ==
- Aka, Ismail (1996). "The Agricultural and Commercial Activities of the Timurids in the First Half of the 15th Century". Oriente Moderno. 15 (76/2). Istituto per l'Oriente C. A. Nallino: 9–21. doi:10.1163/22138617-07602003. JSTOR 25817400.
- Ashraf, Ahmad (2006). "Iranian identity iii. Medieval Islamic Period". In Yarshater, Ehsan (ed.). Encyclopædia Iranica. Vol. XIII/5: Iran X. Religions in Iran–Iraq V. Safavid period. London and New York: Routledge & Kegan Paul. pp. 507–522. ISBN 978-0-933273-93-1.
- Beckwith, Christopher I. (2009). "Chinggis Khan and the Mongol Conquests". Empires of the Silk Road: A History of Central Eurasia From the Bronze Age to the Present. Princeton University Press. ISBN 978-0-691-15034-5.
- Bosworth, C. Edmund (1996). "Persia After the Mongols". The New Islamic Dynasties: A Chronological and Genealogical Manual. Columbia University Press. ISBN 978-0748621378.
- Golden, P. Benjamin (2011). "The Later Chinggisids, Temür, and the Timurid Renaissance". Central Asia in World History. Oxford University Press. ISBN 978-0-19-533819-5.
- Green, Nile (2019). The Persianate World: The Frontiers of a Eurasian Lingua Franca. University of California Press.
- Findley, C. Vaughn (2005). "Islamic Empires from Temür to the "Gunpowder Era"". The Turks in the World History. Oxford University Press. ISBN 978-0195177268.
- Manz, B. Forbes (2020). "The Local and the Universal in Turko-Iranian Ideology". In Melville, Charles (ed.). The Timurid Century: The Idea of Iran Vol. 9. Bloomsbury Publishing. ISBN 978-1838606886.
- Manz, B. Forbes (1989). "Introduction". The Rise and Rule of Tamerlane. Cambridge University Press. ISBN 9780521633840.
- Subtelny, Maria Eva (1988). "Centralizing Reform and Its Opponents in the Late Timurid Period". Iranian Studies. 21 (1/2): 123–51. doi:10.1080/00210868808701712. JSTOR 4310597.
- Paul, Juergen (2020). "Armies, lords, and subjects in medieval Iran". The Cambridge World History of Violence, Vol. 2, Edited by Matthew Gordon, Richard Kaeuper, Harriet Zurndorfer: 58–78.
- Subtelny, M. Eva (2007). Timurids in Transition: Turko-Persian Politics and Acculturation in Medieval Iran. Brill. ISBN 978-9004160316.
- Ruggles, D. Fairchild (2011). Islamic Gardens and Landscapes. University of Pennsylvania Press.
- Lee, Joo-Yup (2024). "The Turko-Mongols (or "Mongol Turks") of the Qipchaq Steppe and Central Asia". The Turkic Peoples in World History. New York: Routledge. p. 224. doi:10.4324/9781003256496-5. ISBN 9781032170015.
