= Agra =

Metropolis in Uttar Pradesh, India

Agra Āgarā (Hindi)
- Metropolis
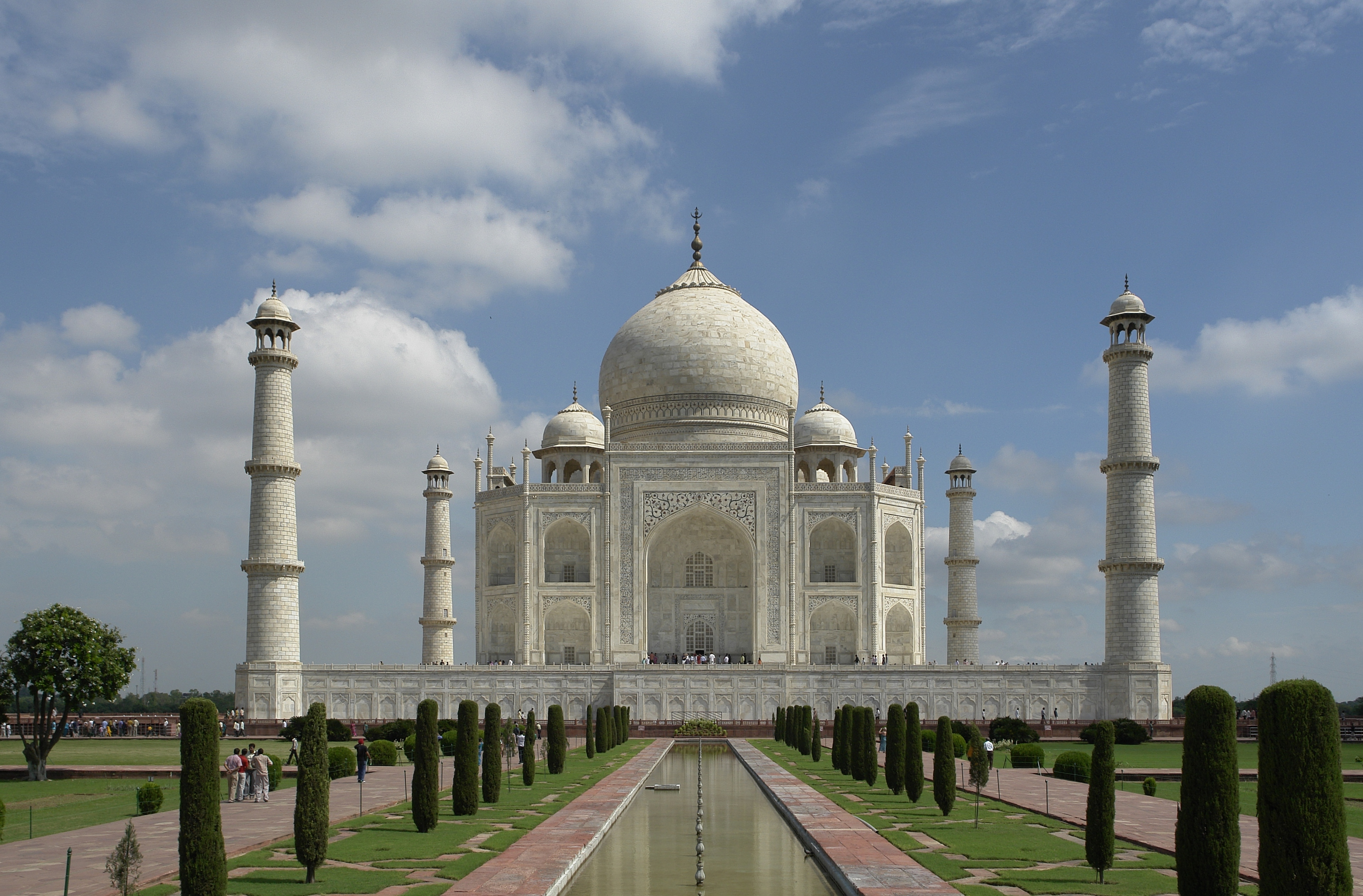
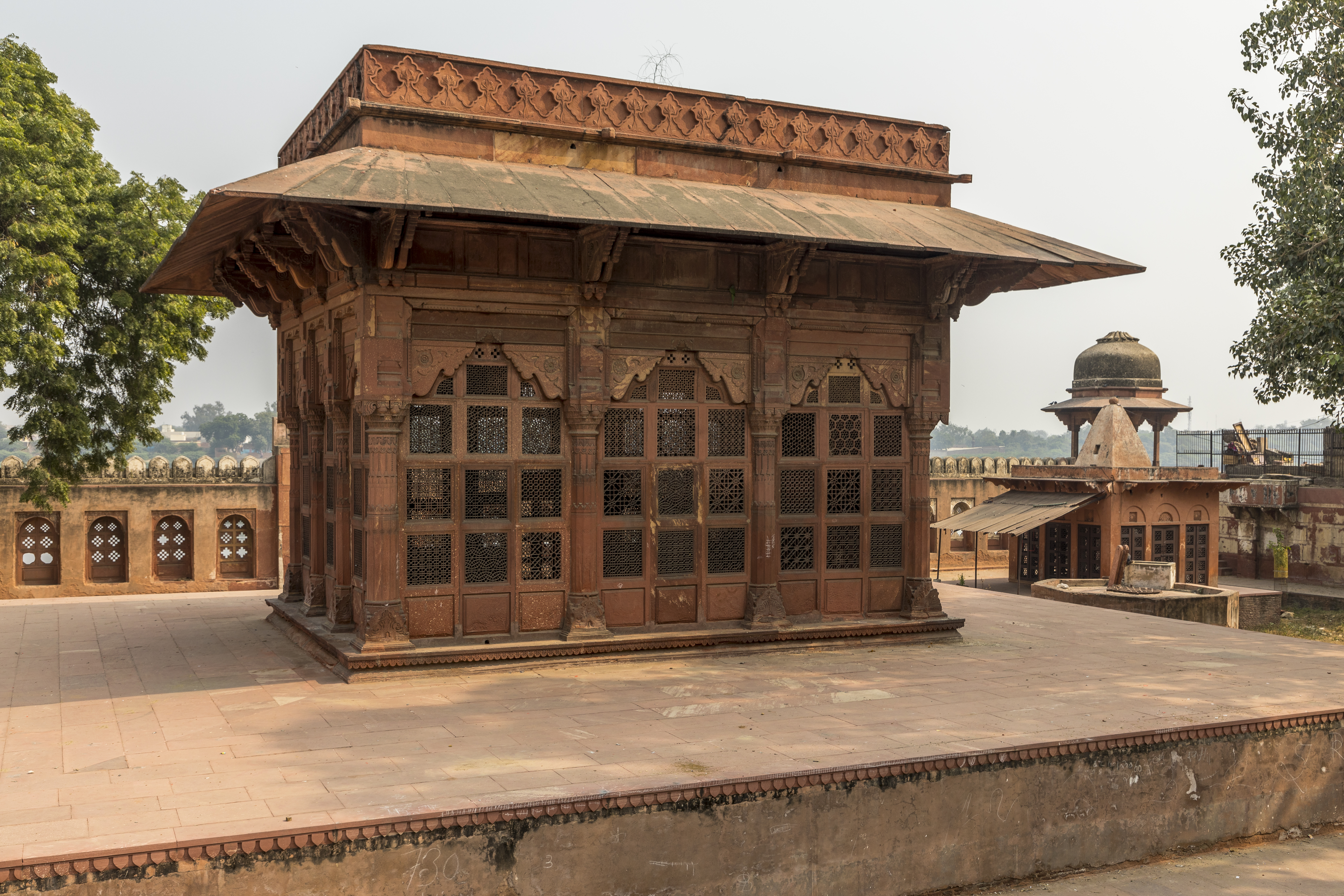
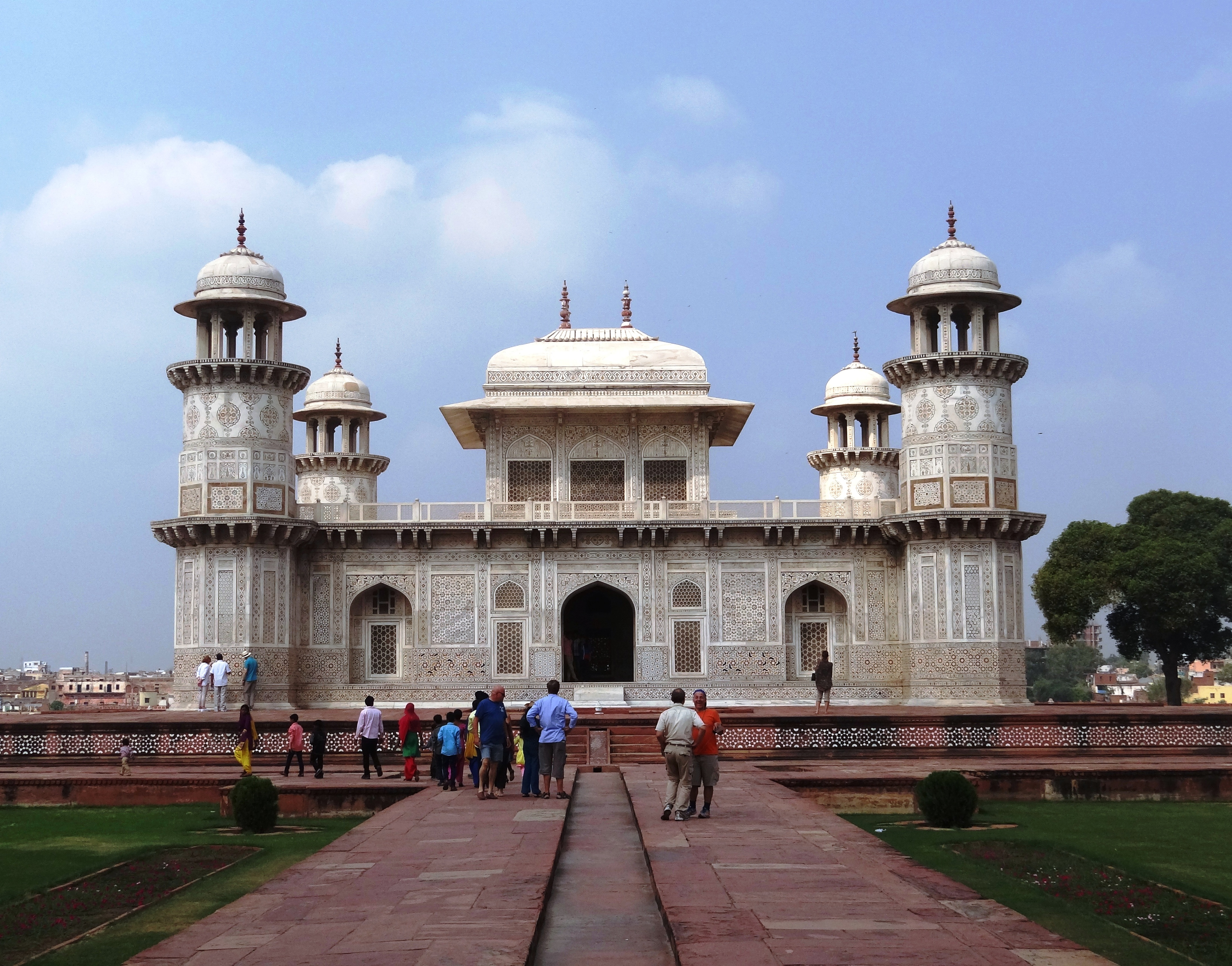
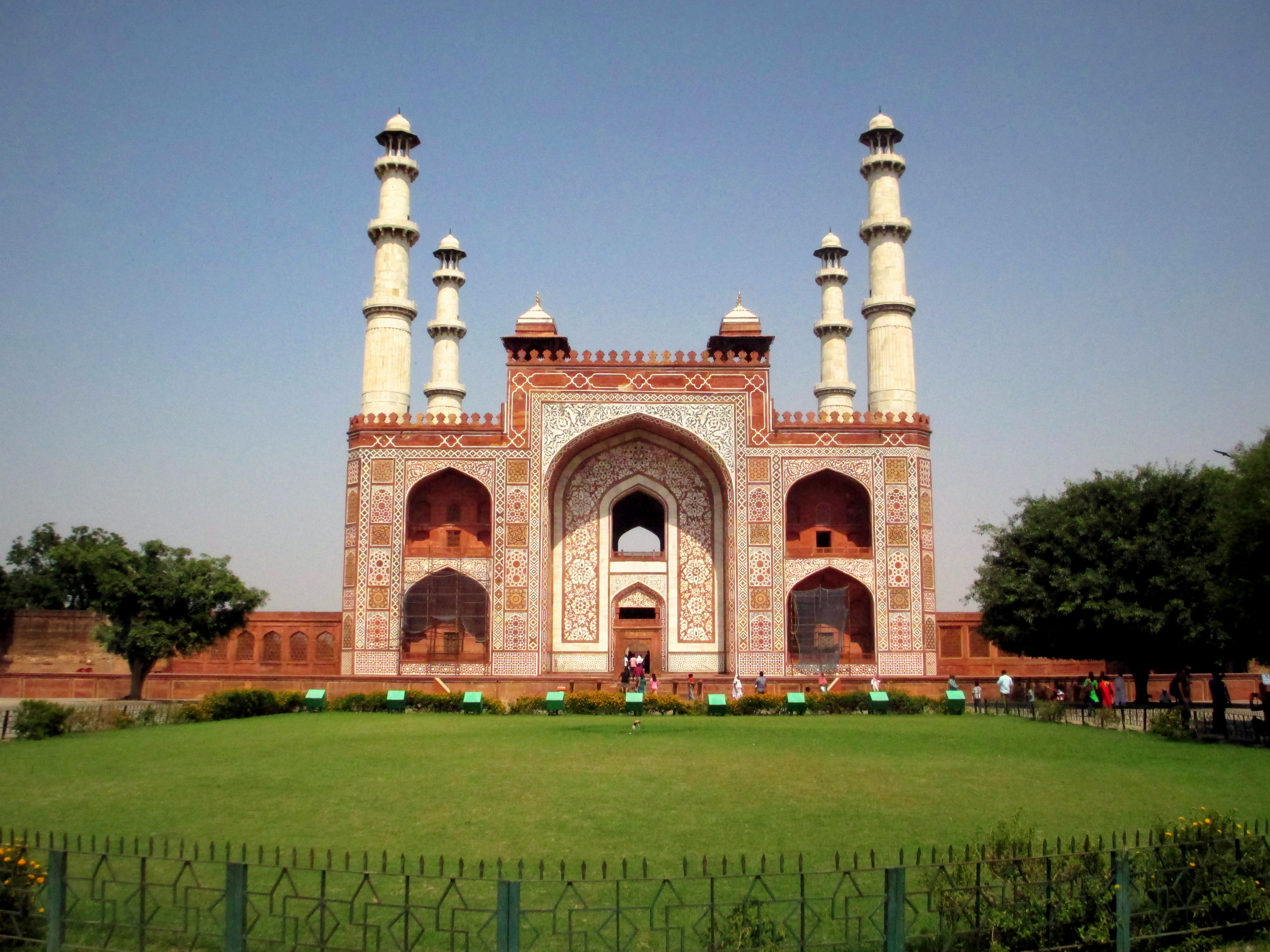
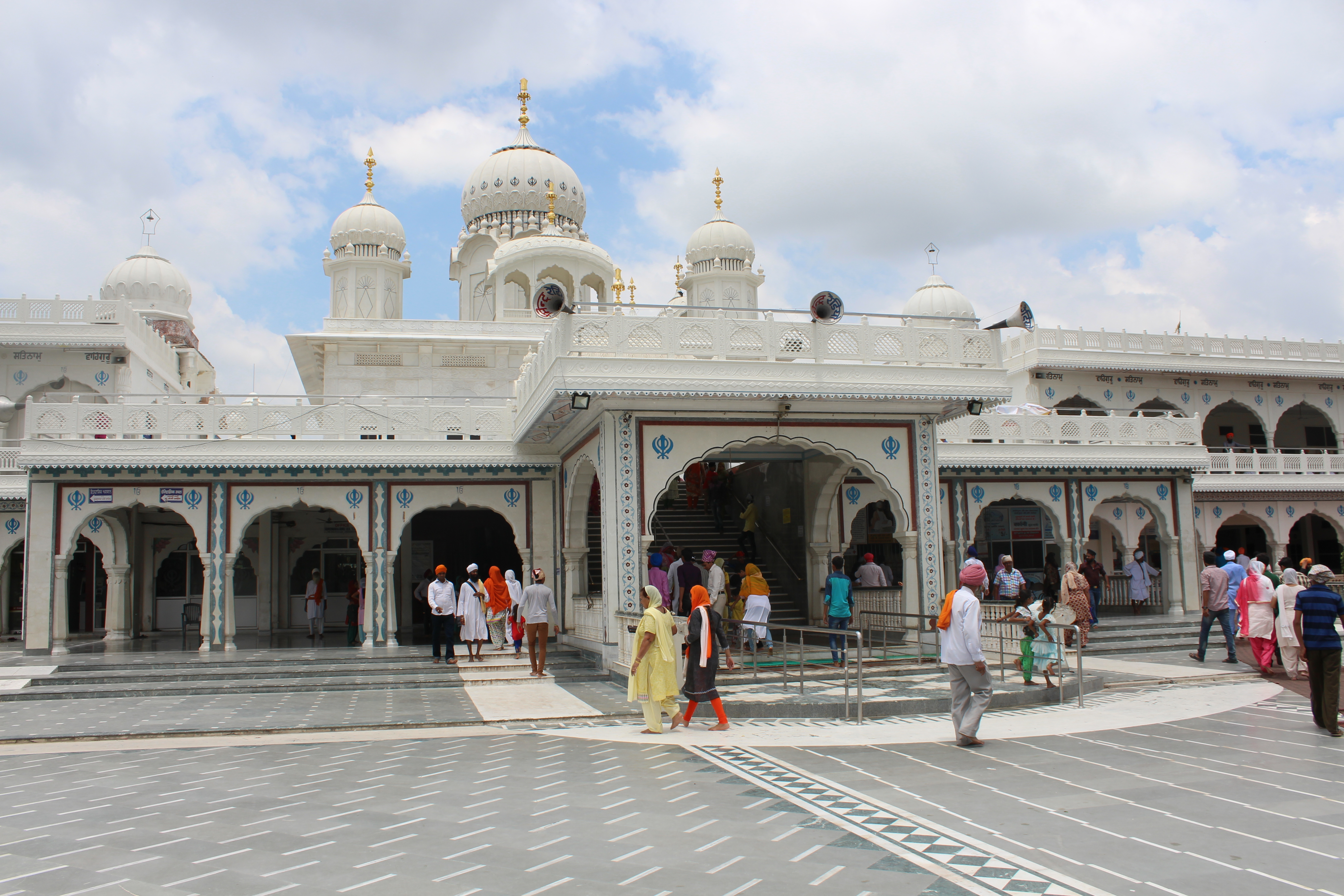
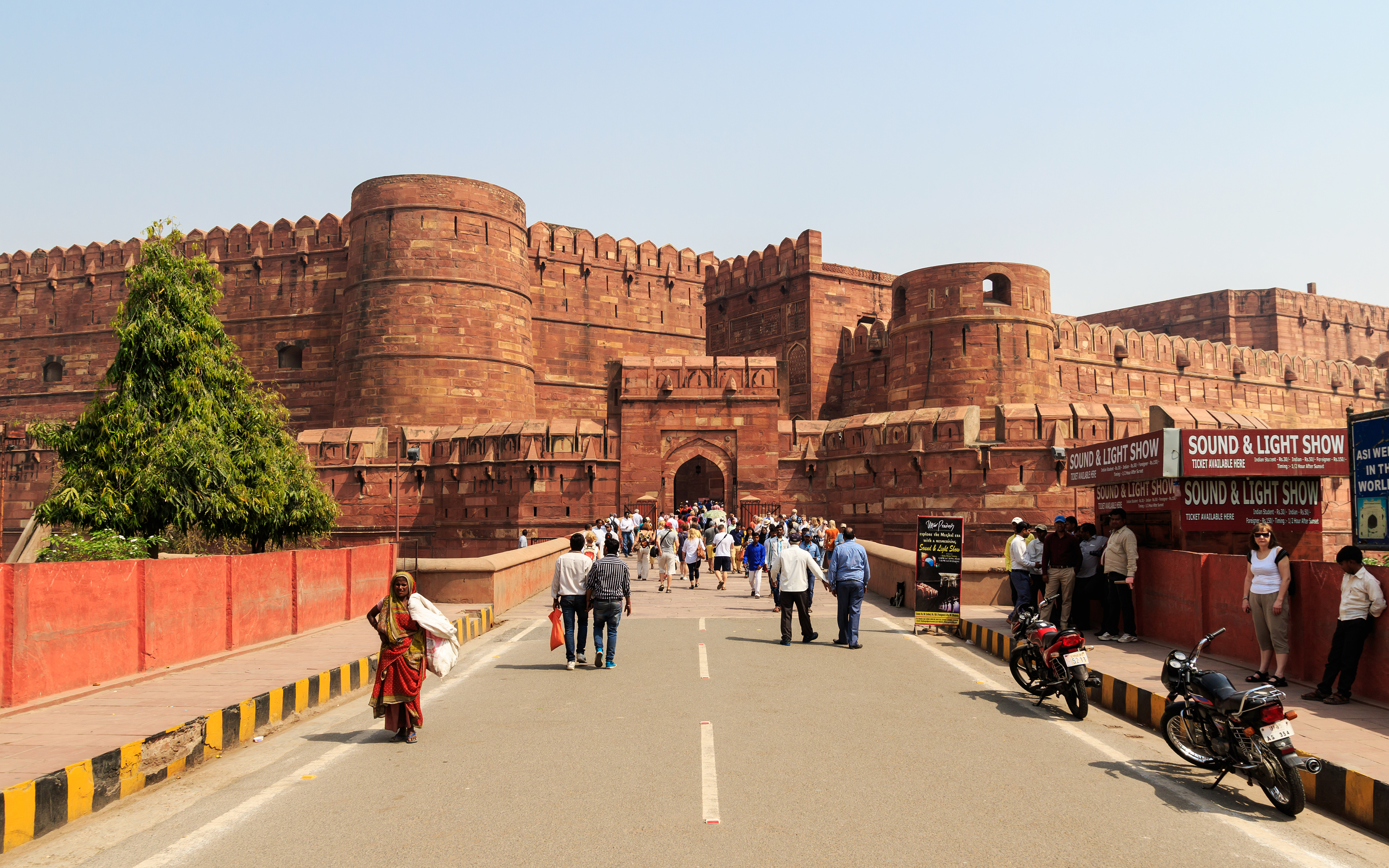
- Taj Mahal Jaswant Ki Chhatri Tomb of I'timād-ud-Daulah Akbar's tomb Guru ka Tal Gurdwara Agra Fort
- Nickname: The Taj City (Taj Nagari)
- Location within Uttar Pradesh Location within India Location within Asia
- Coordinates: 27.18°N 78.02°E
- Country: India
- State: Uttar Pradesh
- Division: Agra
- District: Agra
- Founder: Sikandar II

Government
  - Type: Municipal Corporation
  - Body: Agra Municipal Corporation
  - Mayor: Hemlata Divakar (BJP)
  - Municipal Commissioner: Ankit Khandelwal, IAS

Area
  - Metropolis: 121 km^{2} (47 sq mi)
- Elevation: 170 m (560 ft)

Population (2011)
  - Metropolis: 1,585,704
  - Rank: 23rd
  - Density: 13,000/km^{2} (34,000/sq mi)
  - Metro: 1,760,285

Language
  - Official: Hindi
  - Additional official: Urdu
  - Regional: Braj Bhasha
- Time zone: UTC+5:30 (IST)
- Pincode: 282001-282009
- Telephone code: 0562
- Vehicle registration: UP-80
- GDP Nominal: $ 1.53 Billion (2019-20)
- Sex ratio: 875 ♀ / 1000 ♂
- Literacy: 73.11%
- Website: Official District Website

Agra (/ˈɑːɡrə/; Hindi: Āgarā, pronounced [ˈaːɡɾaː]) is a city on the banks of the Yamuna river in the Indian state of Uttar Pradesh. It is a part of Western Uttar Pradesh, about 230 kilometres (140 mi) south-east of the national capital Delhi and 330 km west of the state capital Lucknow. It is also part of the Braj region. With a population of roughly 1.6 million, Agra is the fourth-most populous city in Uttar Pradesh and twenty-third most populous city in India.

Agra's notable historical period began during Sikandar Khan Lodi's reign, but the golden age of the city began with the Mughals in the early 16th century. Agra was the foremost city of the Indian subcontinent and the capital of the Mughal Empire under Mughal emperors Babur, Humayun, Akbar, Jahangir and Shah Jahan. Under Mughal rule, Agra became a centre for learning, arts, commerce, and religion, and saw the construction of the Agra Fort, Sikandra and Agra's most prized monument, the Taj Mahal, constructed between 1632 and 1648 by Shah Jahan in remembrance of his wife Mumtaz Mahal. With the decline of the Mughal empire in the late 18th century, the city fell first to Marathas and later to the East India Company. After Independence, Agra has developed into an industrial town, with a booming tourism industry, along with footwear, leather and other manufacturing. The Taj Mahal and the Agra Fort are UNESCO World Heritage Sites. The city features mild winters, hot and dry summers and a monsoon season, and is famous for its Mughlai cuisine. Agra is part of the Golden Triangle tourist circuit, along with Delhi and Jaipur; and the Uttar Pradesh Heritage Arc, a tourist circuit of Uttar Pradesh, along with Lucknow and Varanasi.

== Name ==
There are several proposed derivations for the name Agra, none of which is very satisfactory. The most accepted etymon is the Hindi word agar (salt pan), a name given to it due to the region's brackish soil; salt was once made in the area by evaporation. Others derive it from Hindu mythology, claiming that the Sanskrit word agra (अग्र) (literally 'front') means in this case the first of the many small forests where Krishna frolicked with the gopis of Vrindavan. The term Agravana hence means grove forest.

In the Mughal era, Agra was also known as Akbarabad, a name coined by emperor Shah Jahan in honour of his grandfather Akbar.

== History ==
=== Pre-Mughal era ===
Agra has two histories: one of the ancient city on the east, or left, bank of the river Yamuna, going back so far as to be lost in the legends of Krishna and Mahabharata and reestablished by Sikandar Khan Lodi in 1504–1505; the other of the modern city, founded by Akbar in 1558, on the right bank of the river which is associated with the Mughals, and known throughout the world as the city of the Taj.

Little now remains of ancient Agra except few traces of its foundations. It was a place of importance under various Hindu dynasties before the Muslim invasions of India, but its history is unclear, and possess little historical interest. The 17th century chronicler named Abdullah said it was a village before the reign of Sikandar Lodi. The king of Mathura had used the Agra fort as a jail. The degradation in the status of the site was a result of the destruction brought upon it by Mahmud of Ghazni. Masud Sa'd Salman claims to have been there when Mahmud assaulted Agra, claiming the Raja Japal surrendered after seeing a nightmare. Mahmud however proceeds to pillage the city.

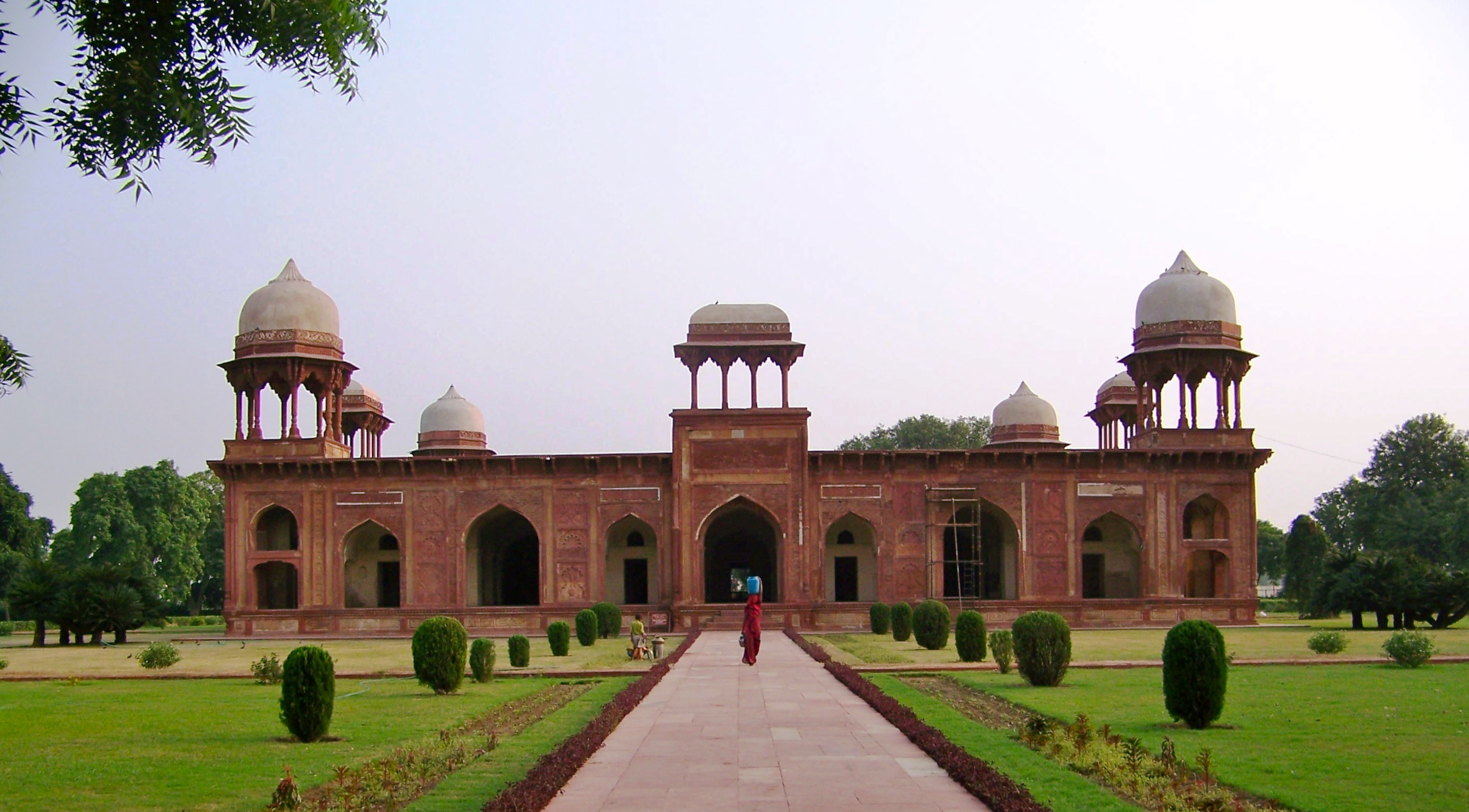
The Tomb of Mariam-uz-Zamani in Sikandra was originally built as a Baradari by Sultan Sikandar Khan Lodi in 1495.

Agra's period of historical importance began during Sikandar Lodi's reign. In 1504–1505, Sultan Sikandar Lodi (reigned 1489–1517), the Afghan ruler of the Delhi Sultanate, rebuilt Agra and made it the seat of government. Sikandar Lodi appointed a commission which inspected and surveyed both sides of the Yamuna from Delhi to Etawah and finally chose a place on the left bank, or the east side of the Yamuna, as the site for the city. Agra on the left bank of the Yamuna grew into a large flourishing town with royal presence, officials, merchants, scholars, theologians and artists. The city became one of the most important centres of Islamic learning in India. The sultan founded the village of Sikandra in the northern suburbs of the city and built there a Baradari of red sandstone in 1495, which was converted into a tomb by Jahangir, and now stands as the Tomb of Mariam-uz-Zamani, Akbar's empress.

After the Sultan's death in 1517, the city passed on to his son, Sultan Ibrahim Lodi (reigned 1517–26). He ruled his sultanate from Agra until he was defeated and killed by Mughal Emperor Babur in the First battle of Panipat, fought in 1526.

=== Mughal era ===
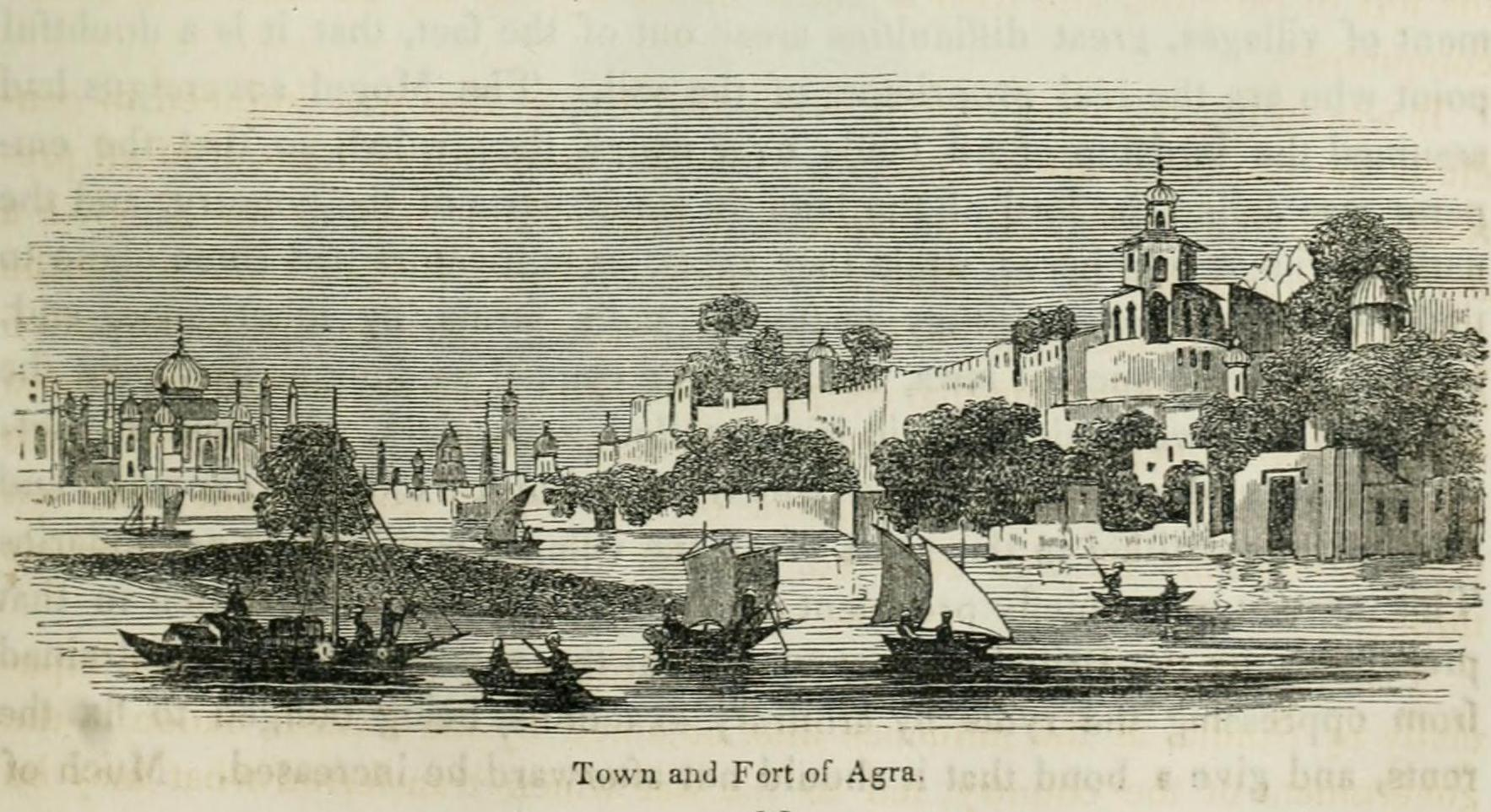
The Town and Fort of Agra, an engraving

The golden age of the city began with the Mughals. Agra was the foremost city of the subcontinent and the capital of the Mughal Empire until 1658, when Aurangzeb shifted the entire court to Delhi.

Babur (reigned 1526–30), the founder of the Mughal dynasty, acquired Agra after defeating the Lodis and the Tomaras of Gwalior in the First Battle of Panipat in 1526. Babur's connection with Agra began immediately after the battle of Panipat. He sent forward his son Humayun, who occupied the town without opposition. The Raja of Gwalior, slain at Panipat, had left his family and the heads of his clan at Agra. In gratitude to Humayun, who treated them magnanimously, and protected them from plunder, they presented to him a quantity of jewels and precious stones as a token of homage. Among these was the famous diamond Koh-i-nur. Babur went on to lay out the first formal Mughal garden in India, the Aram Bagh (or Garden of Relaxation) on the banks of the river Yamuna. Babur was determined to establish the seat of his government at Agra, but was almost dissuaded by the desolate appearance of the region, as clear from this quote from his memoir Baburnama:

It always appears to me, that one of the chief defects of Hindustan is the want of artificial watercourses. I had intended, wherever I might fix my residence, to construct water-wheels, to produce an artificial stream, and to lay out an elegant and regularly planned pleasure ground. Shortly after coming to Agra I passed the Jumna with this object in view, and examined the country to pitch upon a fit spot for a garden. The whole was so ugly and detestable that I repassed the river quite repulsed and disgusted. In consequence of the want of beauty and of the disagreeable aspect of the country, I gave up my intention of making a charbagh (garden house); but as no better situation presented itself near Agra, I was finally compelled to make the best of this same spot.... In every corner I planted suitable gardens, in every garden I sowed roses and narcissus regularly, and in beds corresponding to each other. We were annoyed by three things in Hindustan; one was its heat, another the strong winds, and the third its dust. Baths were the means of removing all three inconveniences.

— Babur, Baburnama

Very few vestiges remain of Babur's city, of his fruit and flower gardens, palaces, baths, tanks, wells and watercourses. The remnants of Babur's Charbagh can be seen today at Aram Bagh, on the east side of Yamuna. Babur was followed by his son Humayun (reigned 1530–40 and 1555–56), but he was completely defeated at Kanauj in 1539, just nine years after his ascension, by Sher Shah Suri, an Afghan nobleman, who had submitted to Babur, but revolted against his son. In this brief interruption in Mughal rule between 1540 and 1556, Sher Shah Suri, established the short lived Sur Empire, and the region was eventually reconquered by Akbar in the Second Battle of Panipat in 1556.

Under Akbar (reigned 1556–1605), and followed by his grandson Shah Jahan, Agra was immortalised in the history of the world. Akbar built the modern city of Agra on the right bank of Yamuna, where the majority of its part still lies. He converted the city into a great centre of political, cultural and economic importance, connecting it with the various parts of his vast empire. Akbar raised the towering ramparts of the Agra Fort, besides making Agra a centre for learning, arts, commerce, and religion. Akbar also built a new capital city of Fatehpur Sikri, around 35 km from Agra. The new capital city was later abandoned. Before his death, Agra had become probably one of the biggest cities in the east, with huge amounts of trade and commerce happening through its bazaars. The English traveller Ralph Fitch who visited Agra in September 1585 in the life-time of Akbar, writes about the town:

Agra is a very great city, and populous, built with stone, having fair and large streets with a fair river running by it . . . . Agra and Fatehpur Sikri are two very great cities, either of them much greater than London, and very populous. Between Agra and Fatehpur are twelve miles (kos in reality) and all the way is a market of victuals and other things as full as though a man were still in a town, and so many people as if a man were in a market.

These impressions of Fitch are corroborated by another European traveller, William Finch, who remarked about Agra:

It is spacious, large, populous beyond measure, that you can hardly pass the street . . . .

Agra continued to expand and flourish during Akbar's successor Jahangir's reign as he wrote in his autobiography Tuzuk-e-Jahangiri:

The habitable part of Agra extends on both sides of the river. On its west side, which has the greater population, its circumference is seven kos, and its breadth is one kos. The circumference of the inhabited part on the other side of the river, the side towards the east, is 2 1/2 kos, its length being one kos and its breadth half a kos. But in the number of its buildings it is equal to several cities of Iraq, Khurasan and Trans-Oxiana put together. Many persons have erected buildings of three or four storeys in it. The mass of the people is so great that moving about in the lanes and bazars is difficult.

Akbar's successor Jahangir (reigned 1605–27) had a love of flora and fauna and laid many gardens inside the Red Fort. Akbar's mausoleum at Sikandra was completed during Jahangir's reign. The Jahangiri Mahal in Agra fort and the tomb of Itmad-ud-daulah were also constructed during the reign of Jahangir. Jahangir loved Lahore and Kashmir more than Agra, but the latter continued to be the first city of the realm. It was, however, Shah Jahan (reigned 1628–58) whose building activity raised Agra to the pinnacle of its glory. Shah Jahan, known for his keen interest in architecture, gave Agra its most prized monument, the Taj Mahal. Built in loving memory of his wife Mumtaz Mahal, the mausoleum was completed in 1653. The Jama Masjid and several other notable buildings like the Diwan-i-Am, the Diwan-i-Khas, the Moti Masjid, etc., inside the fort were planned and executed under his orders.

Shah Jahan later shifted the capital to Shahjahanabad (now known as Delhi) in the year 1648, followed by his son Aurangzeb (reigned 1658–1707) moving the entire court to Delhi in 1658. With this Agra began rapidly declining. Nevertheless, the cultural and strategic importance of Agra remained unaffected and in official correspondence it continued to be referred to as the second capital of the empire.

=== Later periods ===
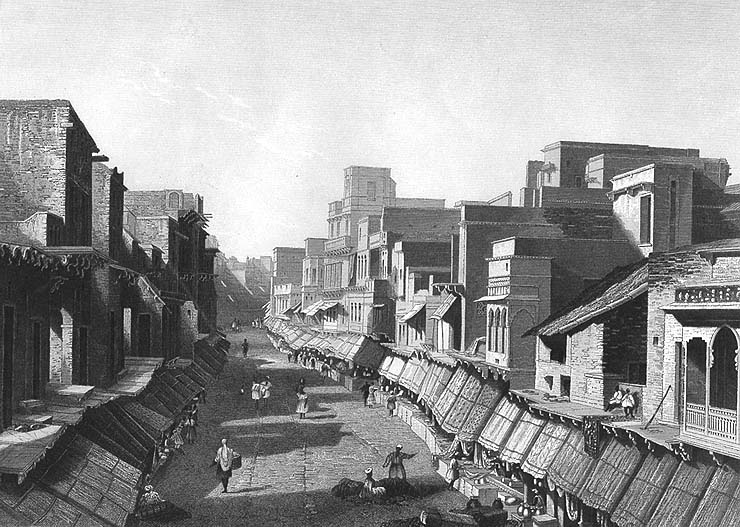
Agra, Main Street, c. 1858

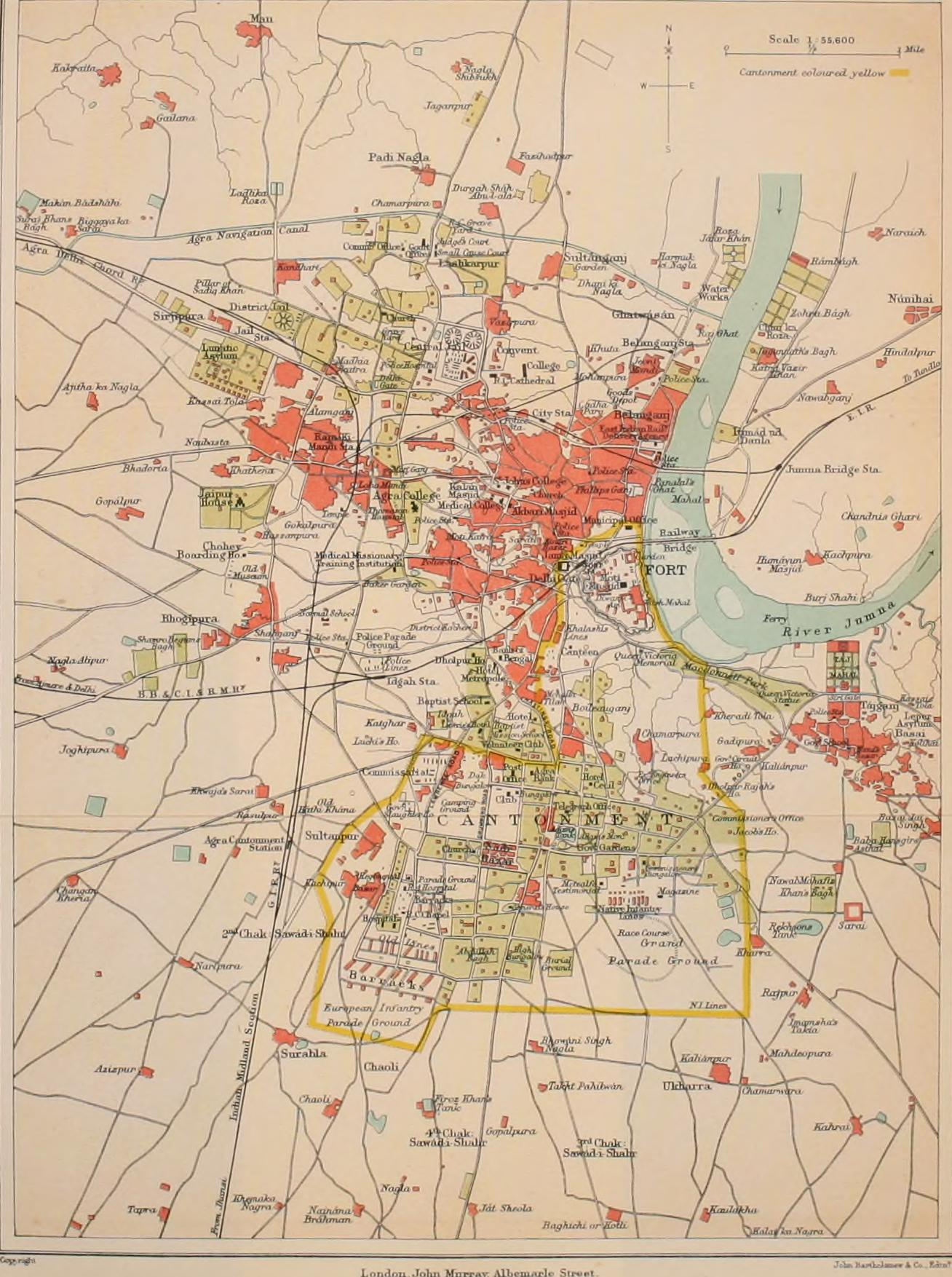
Map of the city, 1911

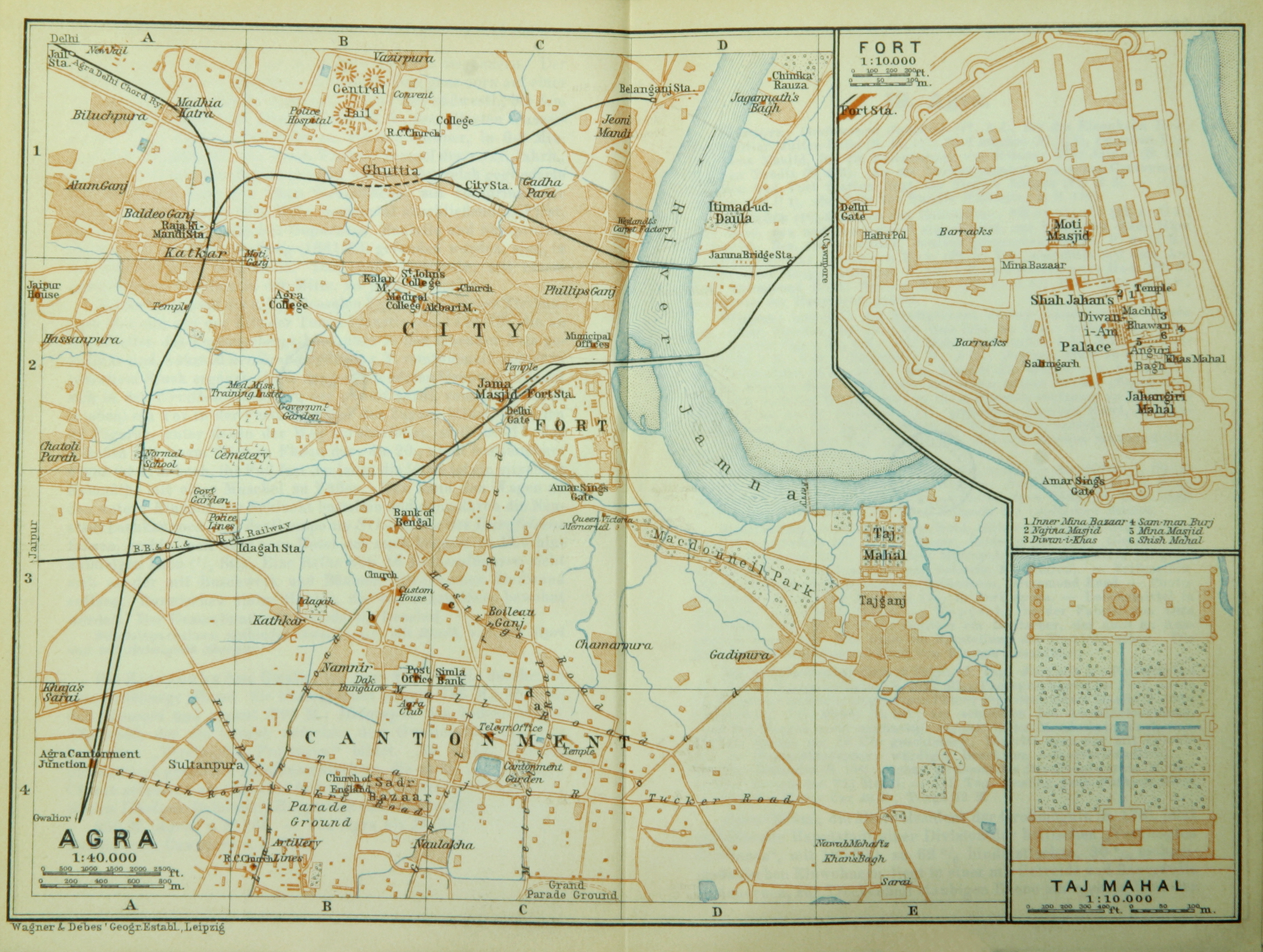
Map of the city, c. 1914

The decline of the Mughal empire caused the emergence of several regional kingdoms, and in the late 18th century the control of the city fell successively to the Jats, the Marathas, the Mughals, the ruler of Gwalior, and finally the British East India Company. The Hindu Jats of Bharatpur waged many wars against the Mughal Empire and in the 17th and 18th century carried out numerous campaigns in Mughal territories. The Jats under Maharaja Suraj Mal conquered Agra on 12 June 1761, after a month-long siege culminating in the Mughals surrendering to the Jat army. After this victory, the Jats melted the silver doors of the Taj Mahal. Agra remained under Jat control until 1774, when the Mughal Commander Mirza Najaf Khan recaptured it. 11 years after the Mughals reclaimed Agra, the city was conquered in 1785 by another post-Mughal Empire power, the Marathas, before falling into the hands of the British East India Company in 1803 after the Second Anglo-Maratha War. In the years 1834–1836, Agra was the capital of the short-lived Presidency of Agra, administered by a Governor. It was then the capital of the North-Western Province from 1836 to 1858, governed by a Lieutenant-Governor. Agra was one of the centres of the Indian rebellion of 1857.

During the Indian rebellion of 1857, when East India Company rule across many parts of India was threatened, the news of the mutiny at Meerut reached Agra on 14 May. On 30 May some companies of the 44th and 67th Native Infantry sent to Mathura to bring in the treasury mutinied and carried off the treasury to the rebels in Delhi. With the fear of the rebellion spreading to Agra as well, the rest of these native infantry battalions, which were part of the garrison at Agra, were successfully disarmed by the British on 31 May. However, when the Gwalior contingent mutinied on 15 June, all other native units followed. On 2 July the rebel force of the Nimach and Nasirabad contingents reached Fatehpur Sikri. Fearing advance of the mutineers to Agra, some 6000 Europeans and associated people moved into the Agra Fort for safety on 3 July. On 5 July, the British force stationed there attempted to attack an approaching force of Mutineers, but was defeated, and the British retreated back into the fort. The Lieutenant-Governor, J.R. Colvin, died there, and was later buried in front of the Diwan-i-am. The mutineers, however, moved over to Delhi, it being a more important attraction for the rebels. Despite an uprising by a mob and extreme disorder in the city, the British managed to restore partial order by 8 July. Delhi, in turn, fell to the British in September, following which an infantry brigade led by Brigadier Edward Greathed arrived in Agra on 11 October without any opposition from rebels. But shortly after their arrival another force of mutineers attacked the brigade by surprise, but was defeated and routed. This minor victory for the British was named the Battle of Agra. It is to be said that, the uprising in Agra was relatively minor compared to Delhi, Jhansi, Meerut and other major rebellious cities and regions. After this British rule was again secured, and the British Raj ruled the city till the independence of India in 1947. The capital of the North Western Provinces was shifted from Agra to Allahabad in 1858. Gradually, Agra declined to the position of a mere provincial town, and its prosperity declined:

But in the economy of the administration of British India Agra is nothing more than a district town; its size, proportions and manifold activities have come down to its present requirements, and continued life in this city does not come above the average of that monotonous muffasil life in India which has been so often and so vividly described by many gifted Anglo-Indian writers. Agra has become of late years a large railway centre, and its commercial prosperity seems to be reviving.

— Agra by 1892, as described by S.C. Mukerji, Traveller's Guide to Agra, pp 55-56

Agra's role in the Indian Independence movement is not well documented. However, in the years between the mutiny and independence Agra was a major centre of Hindi and Urdu journalism. Paliwal park(formerly Hewitt park) in Agra is named after S.K.D Paliwal, who brought out the Hindi daily Sainik.

=== Post Independence and Mughal legacy ===
Post India's independence, Agra has been a part of Uttar Pradesh and has gradually developed into an industrial city, with a significant contribution to Uttar Pradesh's economy. The city is now a popular tourist destination and hosts tourists from across the world. The Taj Mahal and Agra Fort received UNESCO World Heritage Sites status in 1983. The Taj Mahal witnesses tourists, photographers, historians and archaeologists in massive numbers all around the year. The Taj Mahal has become a symbol of India. Post Independence, Taj Mahal has been visited by world leaders like US Presidents Dwight D. Eisenhower (1959), Bill Clinton (2000), and Donald Trump (2020). Queen Elizabeth II of the United Kingdom had visited Taj Mahal in 1961 on her India visit. Taj Mahal has also been visited by Russian President Vladimir Putin (1999), Chinese President Hu Jintao (2006), Israeli Prime Minister Benjamin Netanyahu (2018) and Canadian Prime Minister Justin Trudeau (2018). Agra is the birthplace of the now extinct religion known as Din-i-Ilahi, which was founded by Akbar and also of the Radhaswami Faith, which has around two million followers worldwide. Agra is included on both the Golden Triangle tourist circuit, along with Delhi and Jaipur, as well as the Uttar Pradesh Heritage Arc, a tourist circuit of Uttar Pradesh, along with Lucknow and Varanasi.

== Geography and climate ==
=== Geography ===
The region around Agra consists almost entirely of a level plain, with hills in the extreme southwest. The rivers in the region include Yamuna and Chambal. The region is also watered by the Agra Canal. Millet, barley, wheat, and cotton are among the crops grown in the surrounding countryside. Both Rabi and Kharif crops are cultivated. The deserted city of Fatehpur Sikri is about 40 km southwest of Agra. The sandstone hills near Fatehpur Sikri and on the south-eastern borders of the district are offshoots from the Vindhya range of Central India. Agra is about 210 km away from the National capital of New Delhi (via Yamuna Expressway), about 336 km from state capital Lucknow (via Agra-Lucknow Expressway), and about 227 km from Kanpur (via Agra-Lucknow Expressway). The city has an average elevation of 170 metres above sea level.

=== Climate ===
Broadly speaking, the climate of Agra is classified as BSh by the Köppen-Geiger climate classification system. This is the tropical and subtropical steppe climate, a major climate type of the Köppen classification that occurs primarily on the periphery of the true deserts in low-latitude regions, forming a transition between the desert climate (BW), and the more humid subtropical and tropical climates.

The city features warm winters, sweltering and dry summers and a monsoon season. The Agra district, from its proximity to the sandy Thar Desert to the west, is relatively dry, and has greater extremes of temperature than districts further east. The hot west wind, Loo blows mainly during April, May, and June with great force and can cause fatal heatstrokes. The highest temperature ever registered in Agra was 48.6 °C, on 28 May 2024. The monsoon rains usually begin in the first week in July; and generally end in mid-September. However, the monsoons, though substantial in Agra, are not quite as heavy as the monsoon in other parts of India. The weather moderates by the middle of October. The region around Agra, the northwest Indo-Gangetic plain is prone to extreme fog in the winter months, which is caused due to natural factors like low winds, low temperatures, availability of moisture apart from air pollution. This phenomenon often leads to big delays and sometimes cancellation of trains due to poor visibility. Agra has high levels of air pollution and one of the worst AQIs in India. In a study conducted by WHO using data from years 2010–2016, Agra ranked as the 8th most polluted city in India, along with other nearby cities including Delhi, Kanpur and Faridabad.

Agra has been ranked 3rd best “National Clean Air City” (under Category 1>10L Population cities) in India according to 'Swachh Vayu Survekshan 2024 Results'

Climate data for Agra (1991–2020, extremes 1901–2002)
Month	Jan	Feb	Mar	Apr	May	Jun	Jul	Aug	Sep	Oct	Nov	Dec	Year
Record high °C (°F)	33.0 (91.4)	35.6 (96.1)	42.8 (109.0)	47.3 (117.1)	48.6 (119.5)	48.5 (119.3)	46.5 (115.7)	43.0 (109.4)	41.4 (106.5)	41.1 (106.0)	36.5 (97.7)	31.0 (87.8)	48.6 (119.5)
Mean daily maximum °C (°F)	22.2 (72.0)	26.2 (79.2)	32.1 (89.8)	38.4 (101.1)	41.9 (107.4)	41.1 (106.0)	36.0 (96.8)	33.1 (91.6)	34.2 (93.6)	34.7 (94.5)	29.2 (84.6)	23.7 (74.7)	32.7 (90.9)
Mean daily minimum °C (°F)	7.4 (45.3)	10.4 (50.7)	14.2 (57.6)	20.0 (68.0)	24.4 (75.9)	25.5 (77.9)	24.7 (76.5)	23.9 (75.0)	23.5 (74.3)	18.7 (65.7)	13.2 (55.8)	8.1 (46.6)	17.9 (64.2)
Record low °C (°F)	−2.2 (28.0)	−1.7 (28.9)	5.5 (41.9)	10.0 (50.0)	14.0 (57.2)	12.0 (53.6)	14.5 (58.1)	12.0 (53.6)	13.0 (55.4)	9.4 (48.9)	2.8 (37.0)	−0.6 (30.9)	−2.2 (28.0)
Average rainfall mm (inches)	12.5 (0.49)	10.8 (0.43)	8.3 (0.33)	8.5 (0.33)	21.4 (0.84)	46.4 (1.83)	245.8 (9.68)	198.6 (7.82)	110.8 (4.36)	24.7 (0.97)	2.5 (0.10)	3.2 (0.13)	693.6 (27.31)
Average rainy days	1.2	0.8	1.2	0.9	1.8	3.2	10.3	10.1	5.8	1.2	0.2	0.5	37.2
Average relative humidity (%) (at 17:30 IST)	63	52	44	40	39	45	69	78	69	53	63	65	57
Average dew point °C (°F)	8 (46)	11 (52)	13 (55)	14 (57)	17 (63)	21 (70)	25 (77)	25 (77)	23 (73)	18 (64)	13 (55)	10 (50)	17 (62)
Average ultraviolet index	5	6	7	9	9	9	7	7	8	7	6	4	7
Source 1: India Meteorological DepartmentTime and Date (dewpoints, 2005-2015)
Source 2: NOAA (1971–1990),Weather Atlas

=== Environment ===
The Taj Mahal has faced significant damage due to air pollution and sewage discharge into the nearby Yamuna river. The white-marble Taj Mahal is turning yellow and green because of filthy air in the world's eighth-most polluted city. The Taj Mahal flanks the garbage-strewn Yamuna river and is often enveloped by dust and smog from smokestacks and vehicles.

The Yamuna River is one of the most polluted rivers in the world. Agra is the second largest contributor to River Yamuna's pollution, after Delhi. The river's pollution has caused several problems for the Taj Mahal such as 'Attacks by Bugs and their Green Slime', foul stench and corrosion of Taj Mahal's foundation. The river has as many as 90 nalas or drains opening into it. Though the municipality has claimed to stop 40 of these drains, the bigger ones, Bhairon, Mantola, Balkeshwar nalas continue to discharge huge quantities of untreated waste water without any check. Activists say that the Yamuna river bed between Itmad-ud-Daula and the Taj Mahal has become a dumping ground for pollutants. Polythene, plastic waste, leather cuttings from shoe factories, construction material, are all thrown into the river.

Less than 7% of the Agra district is under forest cover. The only major wildlife sanctuary near Agra is Keetham Lake, also known as Sur Sarovar Bird Sanctuary. The lake has nearly two dozen varieties of migratory and resident birds. Within the Sur Sarovar Bird Sanctuary is the Agra Bear Rescue Facility, which is India's first sanctuary for 'dancing' bears. Operated by Wildlife SOS, Free the Bears Fund and others, the facility has rehabilitate over 620 sloth bears, which were exploited by a nomadic tribe known as the Kalandars as 'dancing bears', despite the practice being illegal since 1972.

Agra has been ranked 3rd best “National Clean Air City” (under Category 1 >10L Population cities) in India according to 'Swachh Vayu Survekshan 2024 Results' https://prana.cpcb.gov.in/ncapServices/robust/fetchFilesFromDrive/Swachh_Vayu_Survekshan_2024_Result.pdf

== Demographics ==
Historical population

Year	Pop.	±%
1871	142,700	—
1881	160,200	+12.3%
1891	168,700	+5.3%
1901	188,300	+11.6%
1911	185,400	−1.5%
1921	185,500	+0.1%
1931	125,300	−32.5%
1941	284,100	+126.7%

Year	Pop.	±%
1951	375,700	+32.2%
1961	462,000	+23.0%
1971	594,900	+28.8%
1981	723,700	+21.7%
1991	891,800	+23.2%
2001	1,275,000	+43.0%
2011	1,585,000	+24.3%

With a population of roughly 1.6 million, Agra is the fourth-most populous city in Uttar Pradesh and twenty-third most populous city in India. As per the 2011 Census of India, Agra city has a population of 1,585,704; its metropolitan population is 1,760,285. The sex ratio of Agra city is 875 females per 1000 males, while the child sex ratio is 857 girls per 1000 boys. The average literacy rate of Agra city is 73.11% of which male and female literacy rates are 77.81% and 67.74% respectively.

Religion in Agra city (2011)
Religion	Percent
Hinduism	80.68%
Islam	15.37%
Jainism	1.04%
Sikhism	0.62%
Christianity	0.42%
Other or not stated	1.87%
Distribution of religions

Hinduism is the most followed religion in Agra city with 80.68% of its population adhering to it. Islam is second most followed religion in the city of Agra with 15.37% of the population following it. These are followed by Jainism, Sikhism, Christianity and Buddhism at 1.04%, 0.62%, 0.42% and 0.19% respectively. Approximately 1.66% stated 'No Particular Religion'.

Languages of Agra (2011)
1. Hindi (94.8%)
2. Braj Bhasha (2.34%)
3. Urdu (1.86%)
4. Others (1.00%)

At the time of the 2011 Census of India, 94.80% of the population in the district spoke Hindi, 2.34% Braj Bhasha and 1.86% Urdu as their first language.

== Administration and politics ==
=== Administration ===
Local administration as of August 2020
Key posts of local administration	Person
Mayor (elected post)	Hemlata Divakar (BJP)
Municipal commissioner	Nikhil Tikaram Funde
Vice-chairman of ADA	Devendra Kumar Singh Kushwaha
District and divisional administration	Person
Divisional commissioner	Anil Kumar
District magistrate and collector	Aravind Mallappa Bangari, IAS
Police administration	Person
Senior superintendent of police (SSP)	Prabhakar Choudhary IPS
ADG, Agra Zone	Ajay Anand
IG, Agra Range	

==== Police administration ====
Agra district comes under the Agra Police Zone and Agra Police Range, Agra Zone is headed by an additional director general (ADG)-ranked Indian Police Service (IPS) officer, and the Agra Range is headed by a deputy inspector general (DIG)-ranked IPS officer.

The district police is headed by a senior superintendent of police (SSP), who is an IPS officer, and is assisted by six superintendents of police or additional superintendents of police for city, east, west, crime, traffic, and protocol, either from the IPS or the Provincial Police Service. Each of the several police circles is headed by a circle officer in the rank of deputy superintendent of police.

==== Infrastructure and civic administration ====
Agra Municipal Corporation or Agra Nagar Nigam (AMC or ANN) is the Municipal Corporation responsible for the civic infrastructure and administration of the city of Agra. This civic administrative body administers the city's public services. The mayor and municipal councillors are elected to five-year terms. It was formed in 1989. The Agra Municipal Corporation oversees four zones (Hariparvat, Lohamandi, Tajganj and Chhata) which are further subdivided into 100 wards. The AMC boundary encompasses an area of 121 square km. The Agra Development Authority (ADA), is develops new housing, infrastructure and colonies in the city. The departments under the corporation are: Assessment & Collection, Building, Central Records, Education, Electricity, Engineering (Civil), Estate, Health, Information Technology, License, Lighting, Market, Parks & Squares, Planning & Development, Project Management Unit, Sewerage & Drainage, Solid Waste Management, Vigilance, Water Supply.

As per the Ministry of Housing and Urban Affairs, the Agra Municipal Corporation reported a revenue of ₹518.37 crore (US$55 million) and an expenditure of ₹466.27 crore (US$50 million) in 2022–23. Taxes contributed to 23.0% of the revenue, with 77.0% of the income coming from other sources.

There are various national programmes that have been implemented in Agra such as National Mission for Clean Ganga (NMCG), PM Street Vendors AtmaNirbhar Nidhi (2020), Swachh Bharat Mission - Urban, PM Awas Yojana - Urban.

=== Politics ===
Vote share of Parties in 2019 Agra Lok Sabha.
1. BJP (57.0%)
2. BSP (38.0%)
3. INC (4.00%)
4. Others (1.00%)
Incumbent MP Satyapal Singh Baghel of BJP won the Agra Lok Sabha constituency with a margin of 2,11,546 votes by defeating Manoj Kumar Soni of BSP. Satyapal Singh Baghel secured 6,46,875 votes.

Agra district has two Lok Sabha constituencies, Agra and Fatehpur Sikri, and nine Uttar Pradesh Vidhan Sabha (Uttar Pradesh Legislative Assembly) constituencies. The MP for Agra constituency is SP Singh Baghel, from Bharatiya Janata Party. Ahead of the election the for 2022 Uttar Pradesh Legislative Assembly, it was announced that two more districts, including Agra, could become a police commissionerate before the elections.

== Utilities ==
The electricity power distribution and bill collection in Agra is the responsibility of Torrent Power, a private sector company as well as DVVNL (Dakshinanchal Vidhyut Vitran Nigam Limited), a state owned entity of UPPCL. The control of power distribution in Agra was handed over to Torrent Power from the state-owned UP Power Corporation Ltd in 2010, in an effort to move towards power reforms and cutting the massive distribution losses in the state. This was the first time power distribution was privatised in Uttar Pradesh, except for Noida-Greater Noida falling under the NCR.

Agra has three primary sources for municipal water supply: water treatment plants at Sikandra and Jeoni Mandi, and groundwater using tubewells. Since a large portion of the water demand is fulfilled from the Yamuna river, which is a highly polluted river, water quality in Agra is usually poor, with unhealthy levels of chlorine required for purification. The city's groundwater is also unfit for drinking, and is saline and high in fluoride content. Both sources breach CPCB standards. To provide the city with adequate water supply, the Gangajal pipeline project has been initiated. It includes a 130 km long pipeline laid to bring Ganga water from Bulandshahr's Upper Ganga canal to Agra. The project has been launched, but has faced criticism due to frequent pipeline leakages.

Though most of the city uses cylinders for cooking gas, piped natural gas is also available in many localities, including Kamla Nagar, Sikandra and others. The service is provided by Green Gas Limited.

== Economy ==
Due to the presence of the Taj Mahal and other historic monuments, Agra has a booming tourism industry as well as royal crafts like Pietra Dura, marble inlay and carpets.

40% of the population depends largely on agriculture, and others on the leather and footwear business and iron foundries. Agra was the second most self-employed in India in 2007, behind Varanasi, followed by Bhopal, Indore and Patna. According to the National Sample Survey Organization, in 1999–2000, 431 of every 1,000 employed males were self-employed in the city, which grew to 603 per 1,000 in 2004–05.

Tourism has a significant role in the economy of Agra, with upwards of 9.5 million tourists visiting Agra and surrounding monuments in 2019. The city is home to Asia's largest spa called Kaya Kalp – The Royal Spa, at the ITC Hotel Mughal in Agra. Other hotels include Taj Hotel and Convention Centre.

Sanjay Place is the trade centre of Agra. There are about 12 major and medium scale industries, producing electrical goods, pipes, leather goods etc. There are about 7,200 small scale industrial units. Above 1.5 lakh pairs of shoes per day are manufactured in Agra by the various footwear units. Agra city is also known for its leather goods, the oldest and famous leather firm Taj Leather World is in Sadar bazar. The carpets, handicrafts, zari and zardozi (embroidery work), marble and stone carving and inlay work.

Agra amassed a GDP of 40.21 billions / 40,210 crores as per the data released by UP Government for the year 2018–19, thus the 3rd rank in the state.

In the Swachh Survekshan 2020, Agra ranked 16th nation-wide, and 2nd in the state after Lucknow, which was a big jump after 86th in 2019, 102nd in 2018, and 263rd in 2017. In the Smart city Rankings, which are pan-India rankings for 100 cities which is released by the Ministry of Housing and Urban Affairs based on the progress/completion rate of Smart City projects, Agra ranked 1st, based on the rankings released based on work done by department concerned under the Smart City project from 1 October 2019, to 1 March 2020.

As of August 2020, Industrial activity in Agra has been affected as a result of the restrictions imposed due to the COVID-19 pandemic that has forced people to remain confined to their homes. The sectors worst-hit are the iron foundries, tourism, leather shoe industry in Agra. It is estimated that the loss in the tourism industry due to COVID-19 restrictions is approximately ₹ 22 billions / 2,200 crores.

Agra has a mixed economy type. Some major firms in Agra are Adwit Solar Power Private Limited, INDUTECH IT SOLUTIONS PVT LTD, Delta IT Services, U S PHARMACEUTICALS, Jeevan Construction Company, Doneria Engineering Company Limited, IT INDIA INFOTECH.

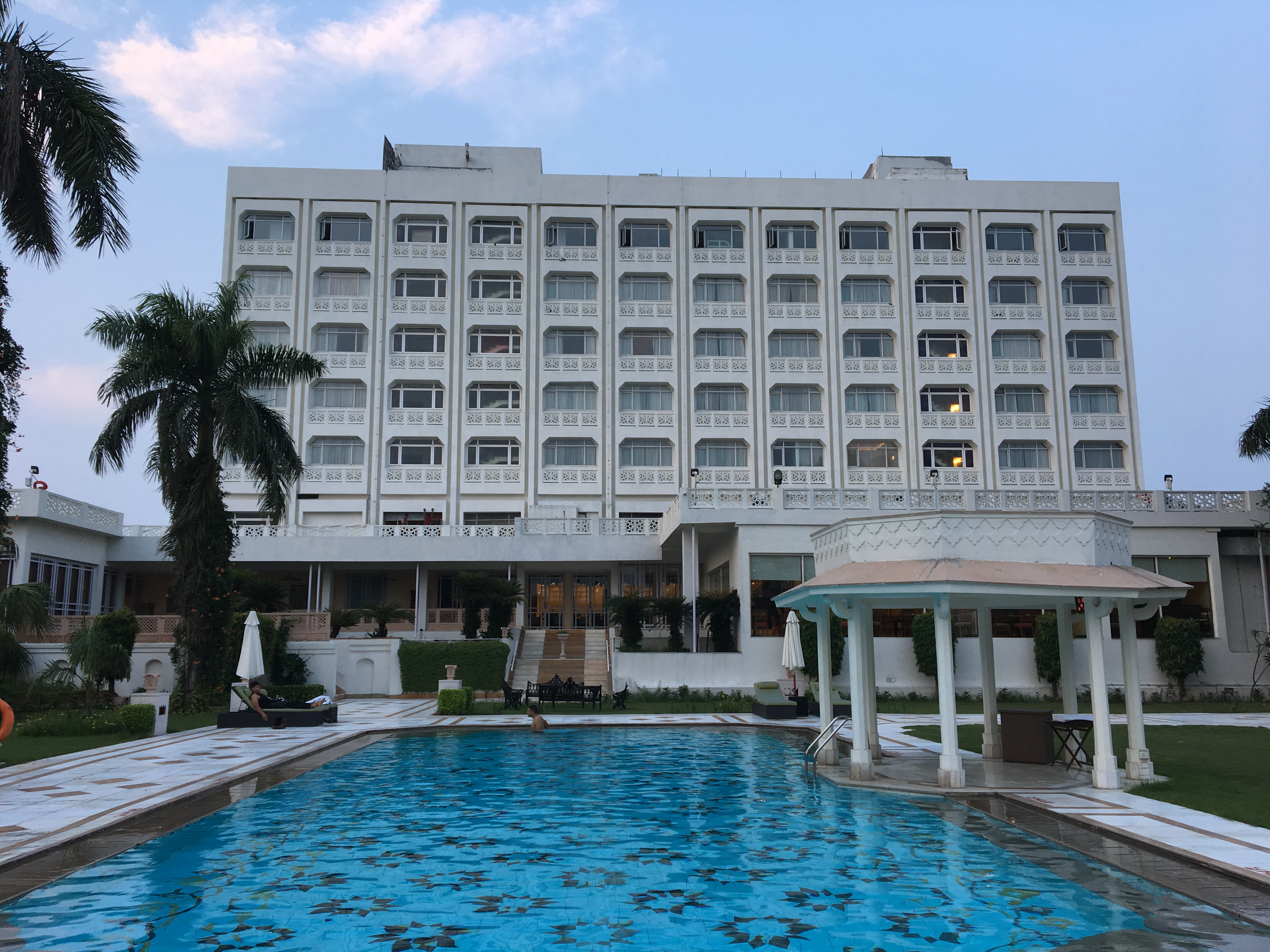
Tajview hotel, the first five-star hotel in Agra, operated by the IHCL group

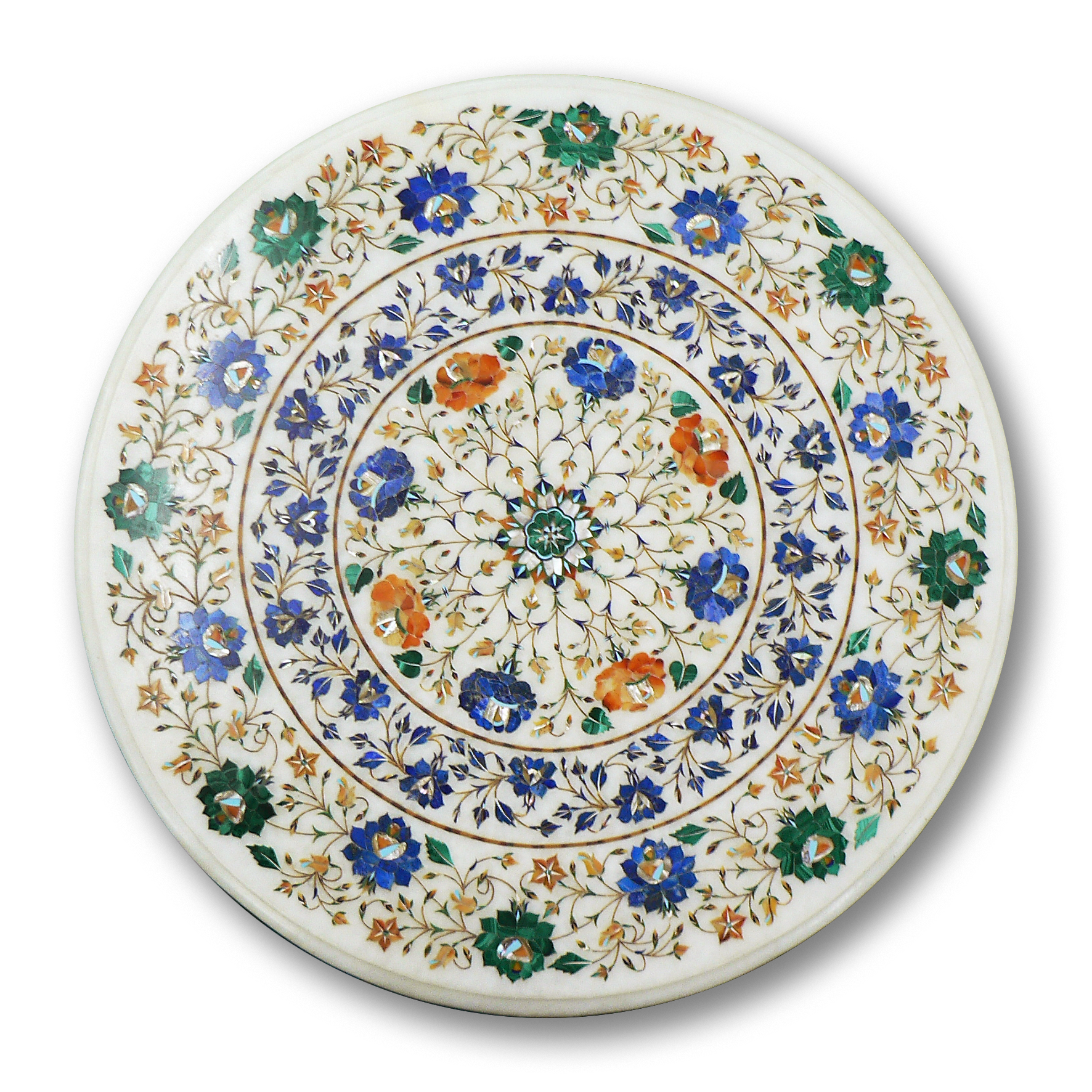
A marble table top in pietra dura, a craft practised since the Mughal era in Agra

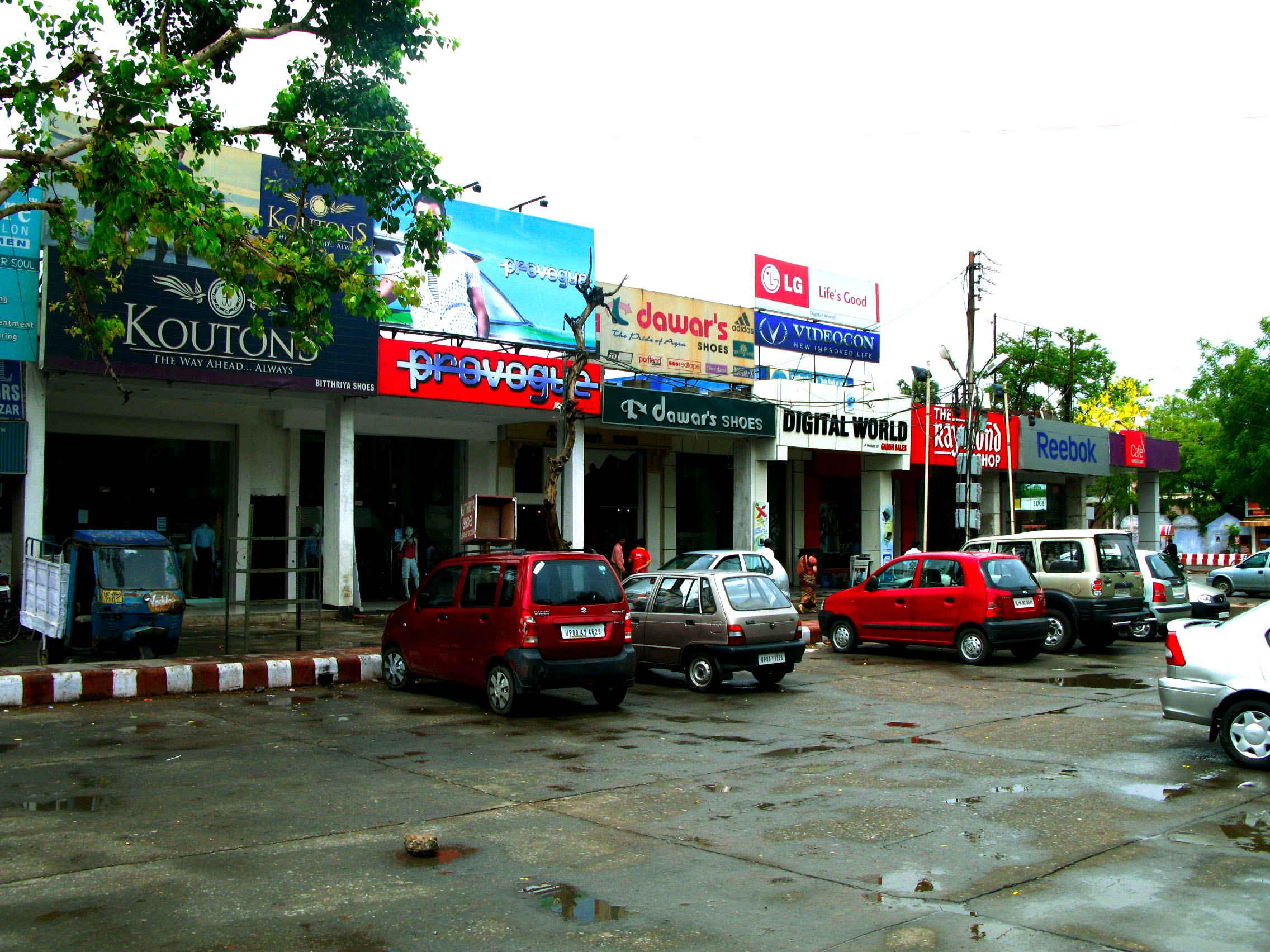
The Sadar Bazar market

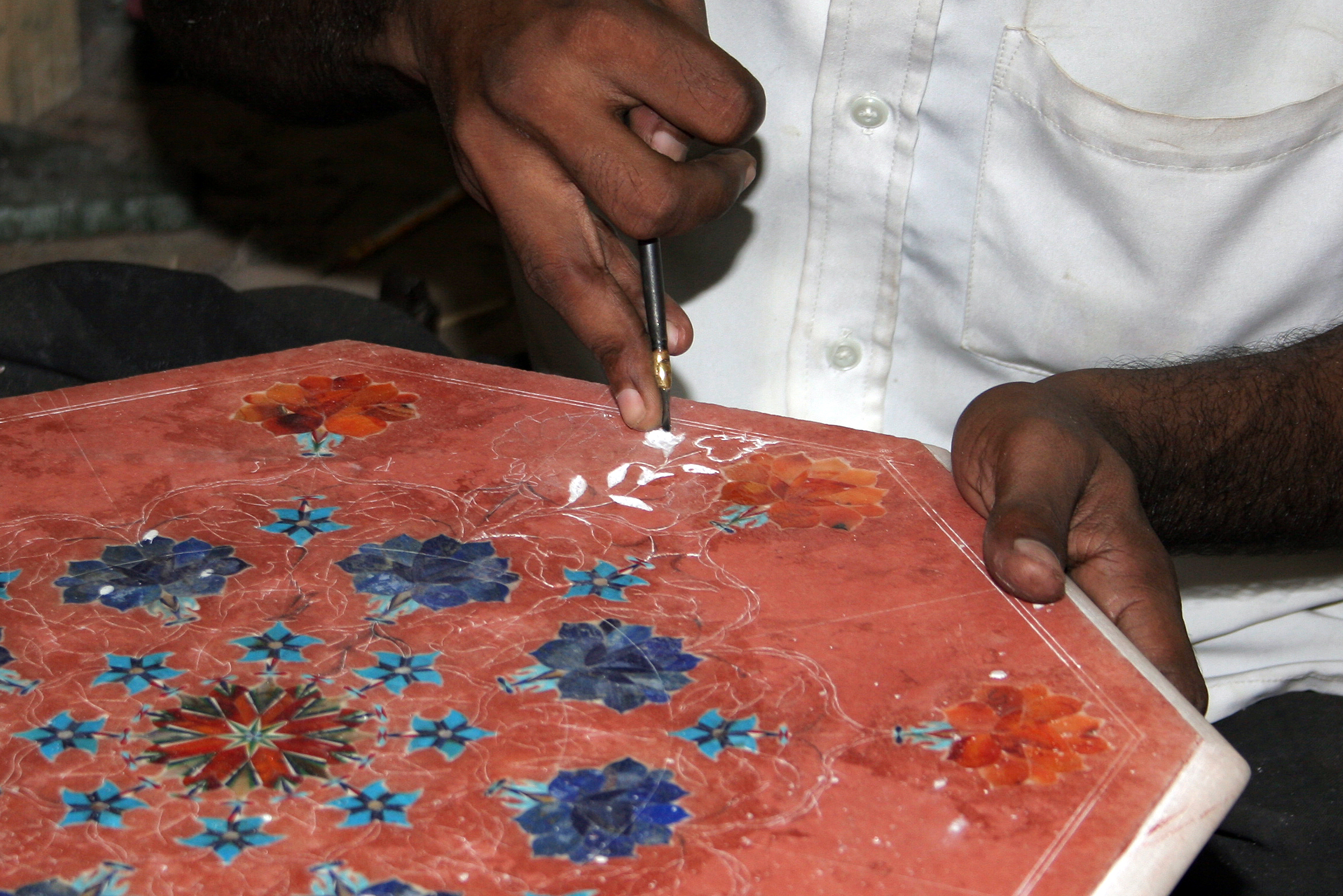
An Agra craftsman working with marble stone inlays. The marble is coloured red to give contrast while working.

== Monuments and architecture ==
=== Taj Mahal ===
The Taj Mahal rises above the banks of the river like a solitary tear suspended on the cheek of time.

— Rabindranath Tagore, (translated by Kshitish Roy) from One Hundred and One Poems by Rabindranath Tagore (pp. 95–96)

Taj Mahal is a mausoleum complex in Agra, built by the Mughal emperor Shah Jahan as a tomb for his wife Mumtaz Mahal ("Chosen One of the Palace"), who died in childbirth in 1631, having been the emperor's inseparable companion since their marriage in 1612. India's most famed building, it is situated in the eastern part of the city on the southern (right) bank of the Yamuna River, about 1.6 km east of the Agra Fort, also on the right bank of the Yamuna. The Taj Mahal is distinguished as the finest example of Mughal architecture, a blend of Indian, Persian, and Islamic styles. Other attractions include twin mosque buildings (placed symmetrically on either side of the mausoleum), pleasant gardens, and a museum. The complex was designated a UNESCO World Heritage site in 1983, and is one of the New Seven Wonders of the world. The Taj Mahal is the most visited tourist spot in the India, attracting nearly 6.9 million visitors in 2018–19.

The chief architect was probably the Persian architect Ustad Ahmad Lahori. Designed as a unified entity according to the principles of Mughal architecture, the five principal elements of the complex were the main gateway, garden, mosque, jawab (literally 'answer', a building mirroring the mosque), and the mausoleum, with its four minarets. The construction commenced in 1632 with upwards of twenty thousand workers from India, Persia, the Ottoman Empire, and Europe working to complete the mausoleum itself by 1639, the adjunct buildings by 1643, with decoration work continuing until at least 1647. In total, construction of the 42 acre (17 hectare) complex spanned 22 years.

It can be observed from Agra Fort from where Emperor Shah Jahan gazed at it for the last eight years of his life, a prisoner of his son Aurangzeb. Verses of the Quran are inscribed on it and at the top of the gate are 22 small domes, signifying the number of years the monument took to build. The Taj Mahal was built on a marble platform that stands above a sandstone one. The most elegant and largest dome of the Taj Mahal has a diameter of 60 feet (18 m), and has a height of 80 feet (24 m); directly under this dome is the tomb of Mumtaz Mahal. Shah Jahan's tomb was erected next to hers by his son Aurangzeb. The interiors are decorated with fine pietra dura inlay work, incorporating semi-precious stones.

However, air pollution caused by emissions from foundries and other nearby factories and exhaust from motor vehicles has damaged the Taj, notably its marble facade. A number of measures have been taken to reduce the threat to the monument, among them the closing of some foundries and the installation of pollution-control equipment at others, the creation of a parkland buffer zone around the complex, and the banning of nearby vehicular traffic, and more recently, use of 'mud pack' therapy. Perhaps most importantly, the 10,400 km^{2} (4,000 sq mi) Taj Trapezium Zone has been created around the Taj Mahal and other nearby monuments where strict pollution restrictions are in place on industries, following a 1996 Supreme Court of India ruling.

Some antique views were published in the Fisher's Drawing Room Scrap Books, namely Tâj-Mahal, Agra. by Samuel Prout from a mid-distant angle (1832) and Ruins about the Taj Mahal. by S. Austin from those said ruins (1836). Both are accompanied by poetical illustrations by Letitia Elizabeth Landon.

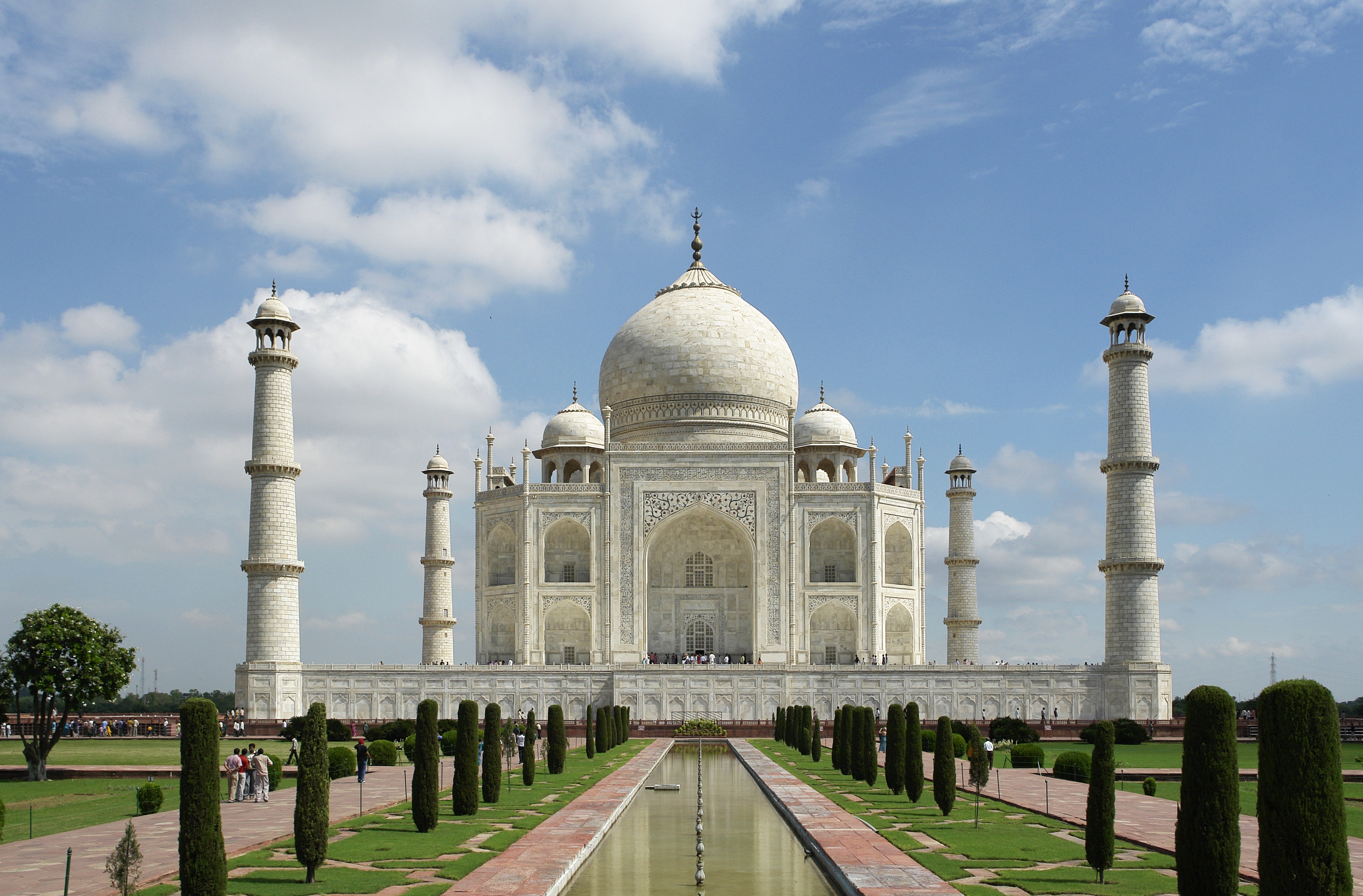
The most common front view of the Taj Mahal

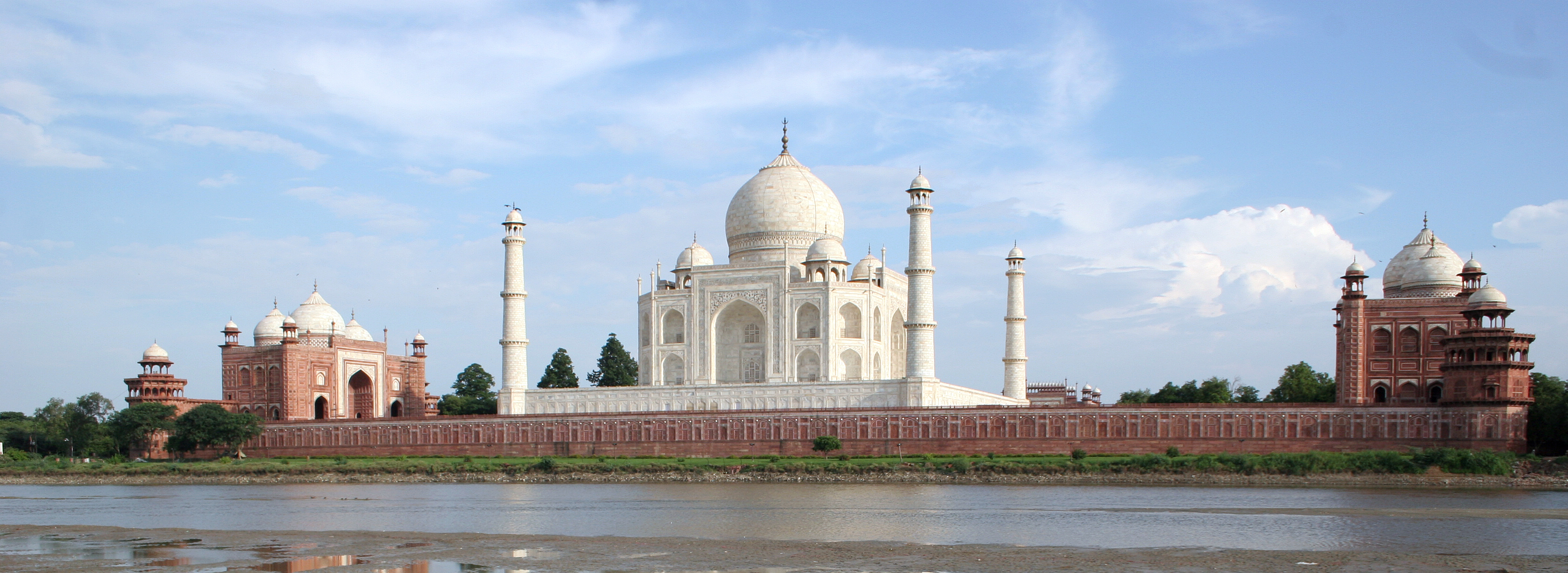
Taj Mahal and outlying buildings as seen from across the Yamuna River (northern view)

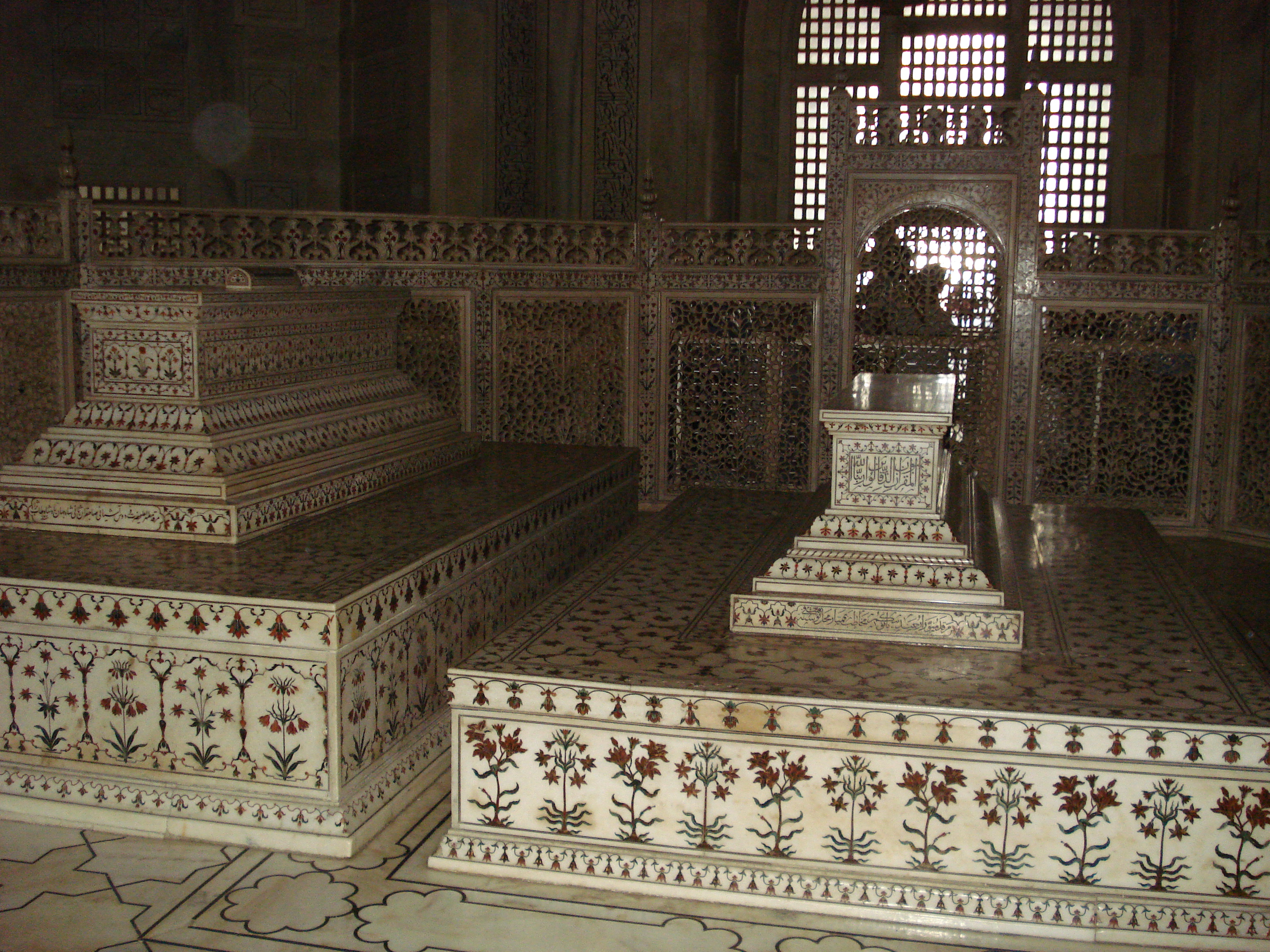
Tombs of Shah Jahan and his beloved wife, Mumtaz Mahal

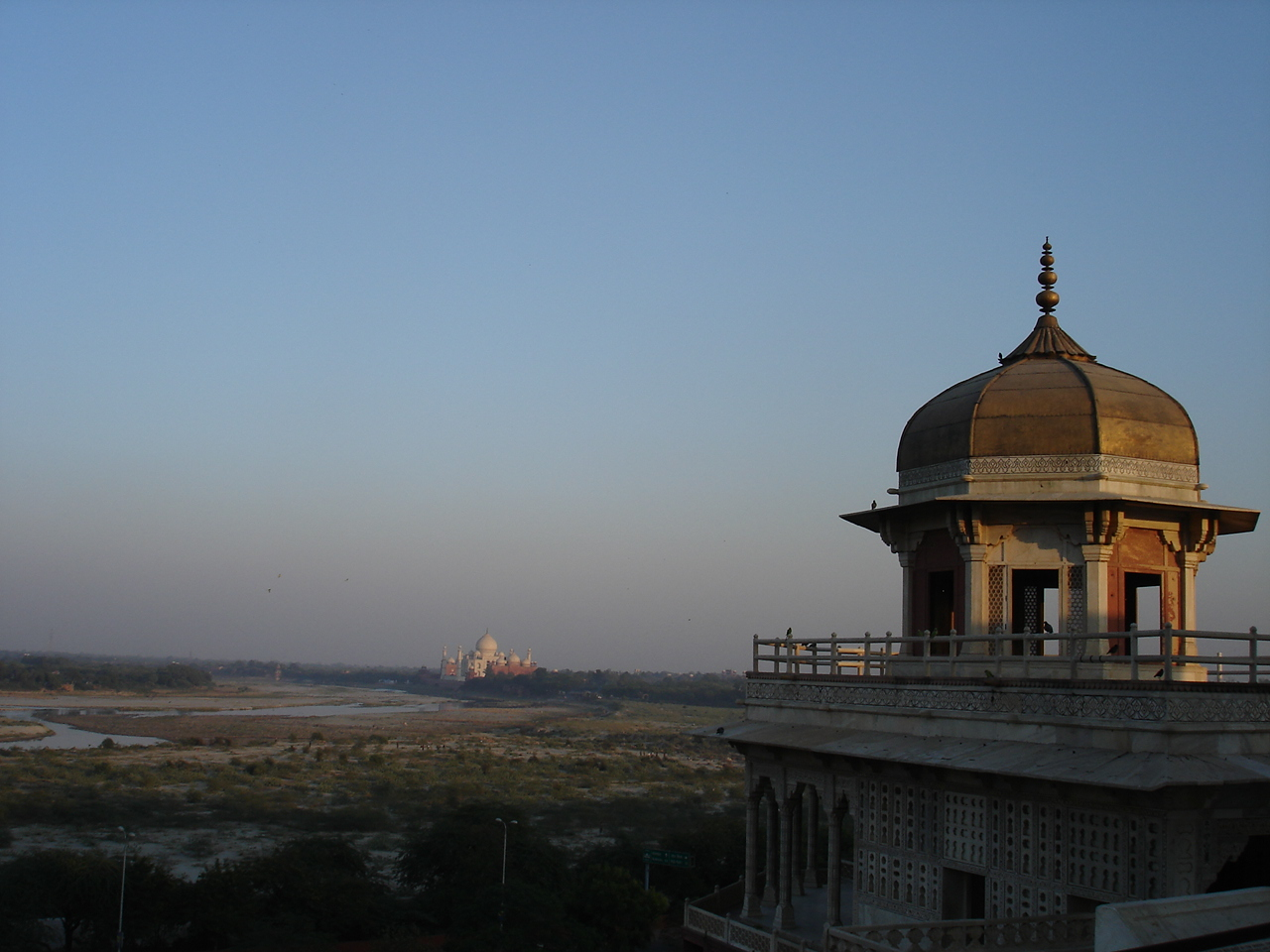
Taj Mahal from Agra fort

=== Agra Fort ===
The Agra Fort is a large 16th-century fortress of red sandstone located by the Yamuna River in Agra. It was first established by the Mughal Emperor Akbar and served as the seat of royal government when Agra was the capital of the Mughal empire in addition to being a military base and a royal residence. Built on the site of earlier fortifications by Islam Shah Suri(son of Sher Shah Suri), the Agra Fort lies on the right bank of the Yamuna River and is connected to the Taj Mahal (downstream, around a bend in the Yamuna), by a stretch of parkland. The fort was commissioned by Akbar in 1565, taking around eight years to build. Though much of the structure of the fort was founded by Akbar, both the interior and exterior underwent considerable changes under his son Jahangir and grandson Shah Jahan, who added many new structures, often of marble. The red sandstone walls of the roughly semi-circular structure have a perimeter of about 2.5 km, rise 21 metres high, and are surrounded by a moat. There are two entrances in the walls: the Delhi Gate facing west, the original entrance, situated nearly opposite to the Agra Fort railway station and Jama Masjid, and decorated with intricate marble inlays; and the Amar Singh Gate(also known as Hathi Pol, or Elephant Gate) facing south, presently the only means in or out of the fort complex. The complex of buildings in the fort—reminiscent of Persian and Timurid architecture, with great inspiration from Jain and Hindu architecture—forms a city within a city.

Among the major attractions in the fort is Jahangiri Mahal, the largest residence in the complex, built by Akbar as a private palace for his Rajput wives. In the Diwan-i-Am (Hall of Public Audience), the emperor would listen to public petitions and meet state officials. The Diwan-i-Khas (Hall of Private Audience) was used for receiving distinguished visitors. The famous Peacock Throne was once kept there, before Aurangzeb took it to Delhi. Near the Diwan-i-Khas stands the Musamman Burj, an octagonal Tower which was the residence of Shah Jahan's favourite empress, Mumtaz Maḥal. The Moti Masjid (Pearl Mosque), constructed by Shah Jahan, is a structure made entirely of white marble. The emperor's private residence was the Khas Mahal, whose marble walls were once adorned with flowers depicted by precious gems. Located to its northeast is the Sheesh Mahal (Palace of Mirrors), its walls and ceilings inlaid with thousands of small mirrors. Numerous other structures are there in the complex, including the Anguri Bagh, the Mina Bazaar etc.

In addition to its other functions, the fort also served as a prison for Shah Jahan when Aurangzeb, his son and successor as emperor, had him confined there from 1658 until his death in 1666.

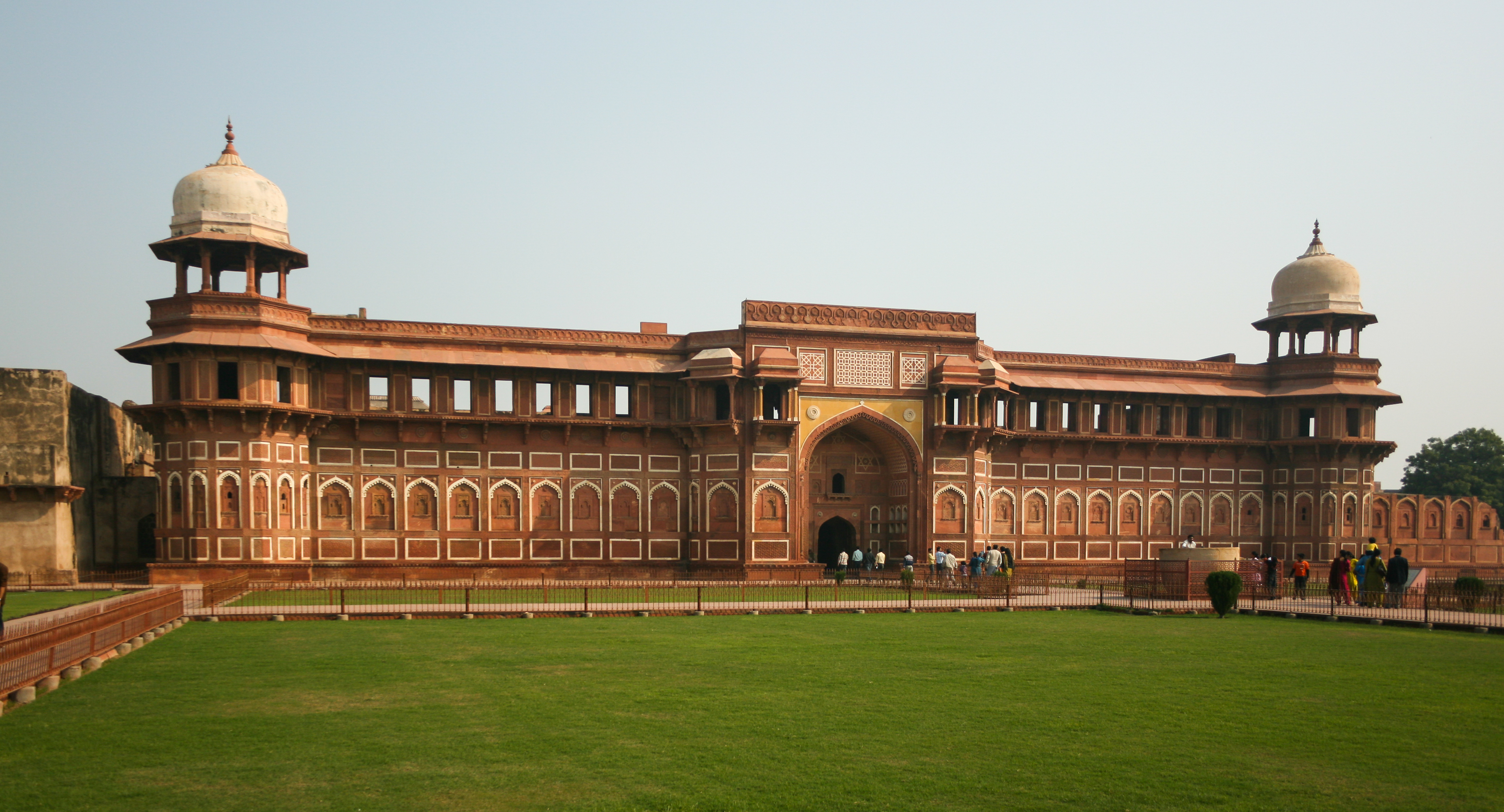
The Jahangiri Mahal, the largest residence in the complex

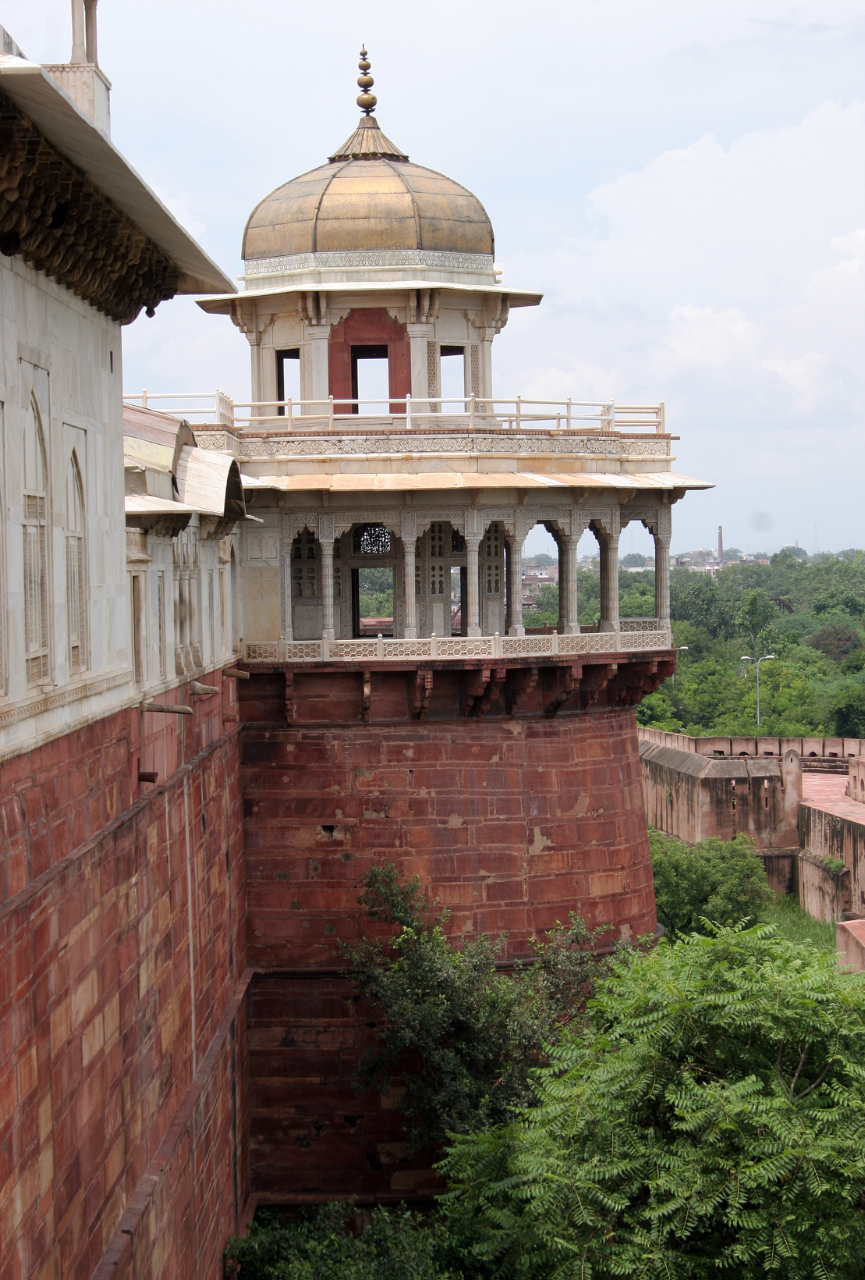
Musamman Burj, an octagonal Tower which was the residence of Shah Jahan's favourite empress, Mumtaz Maḥal

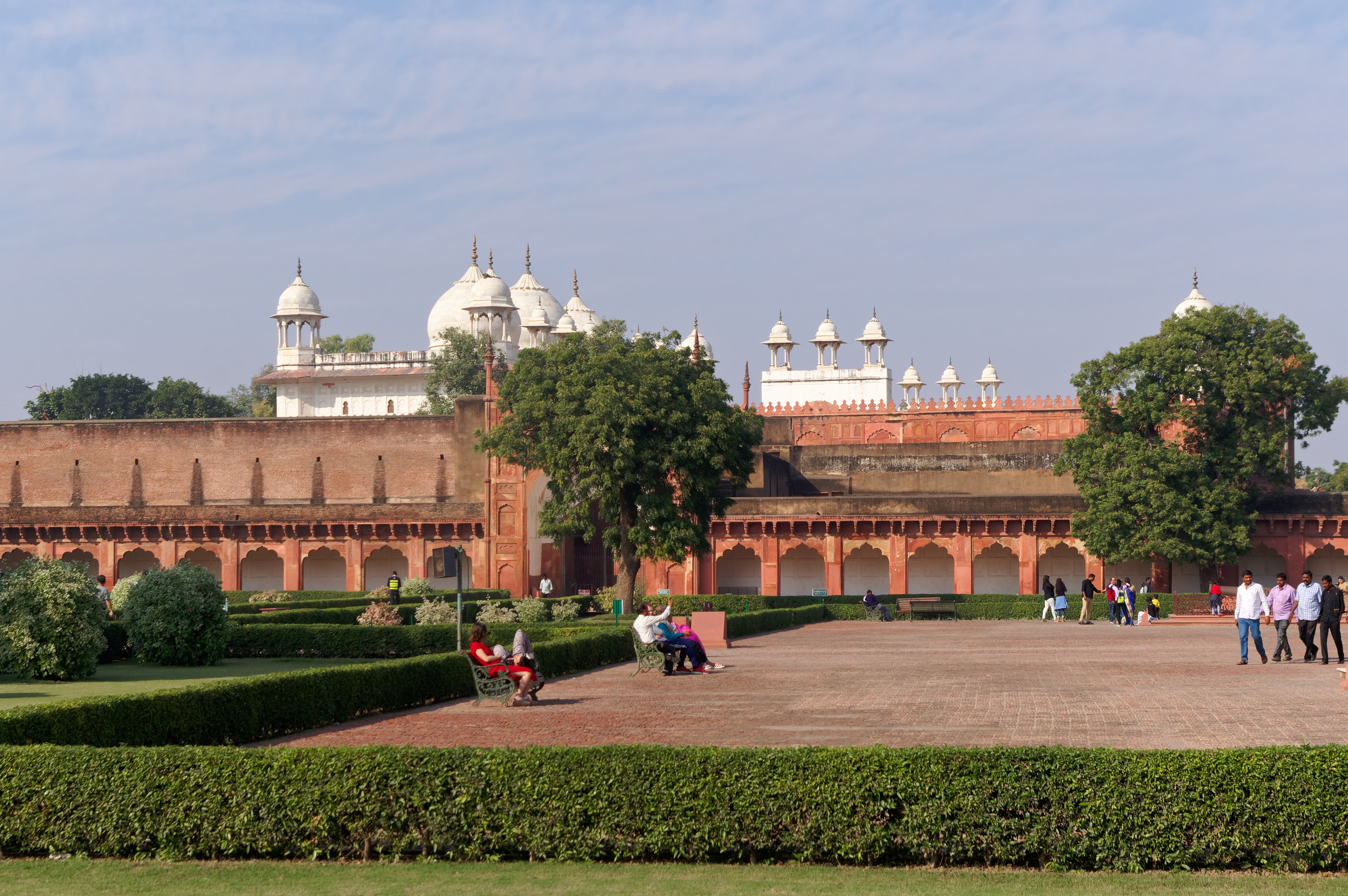
The Moti Masjid or the Pearl Mosque

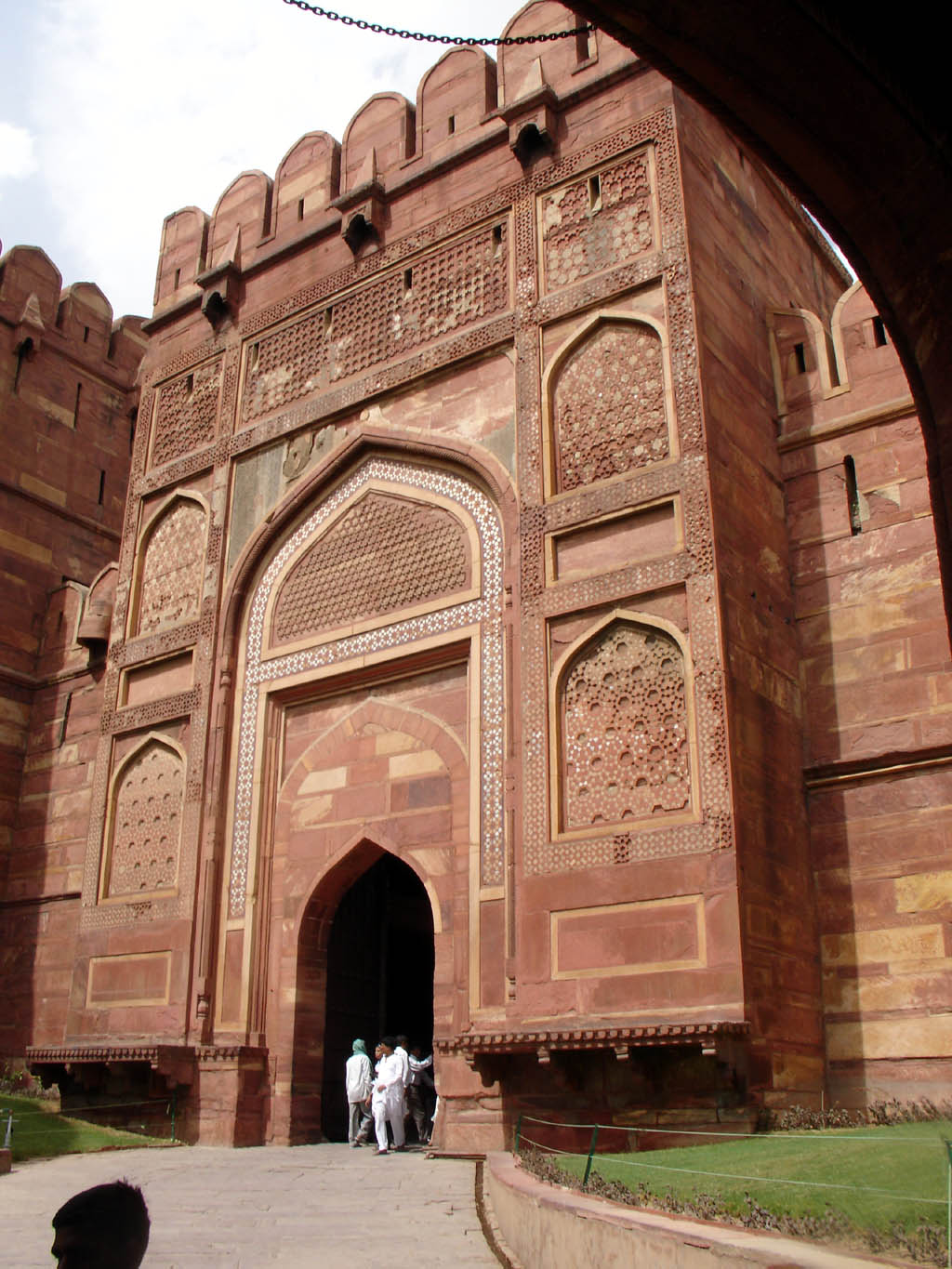
Amar Singh Gate, one of two entrances into Agra's Red Fort

=== I'timād-ud-Daulah's tomb ===
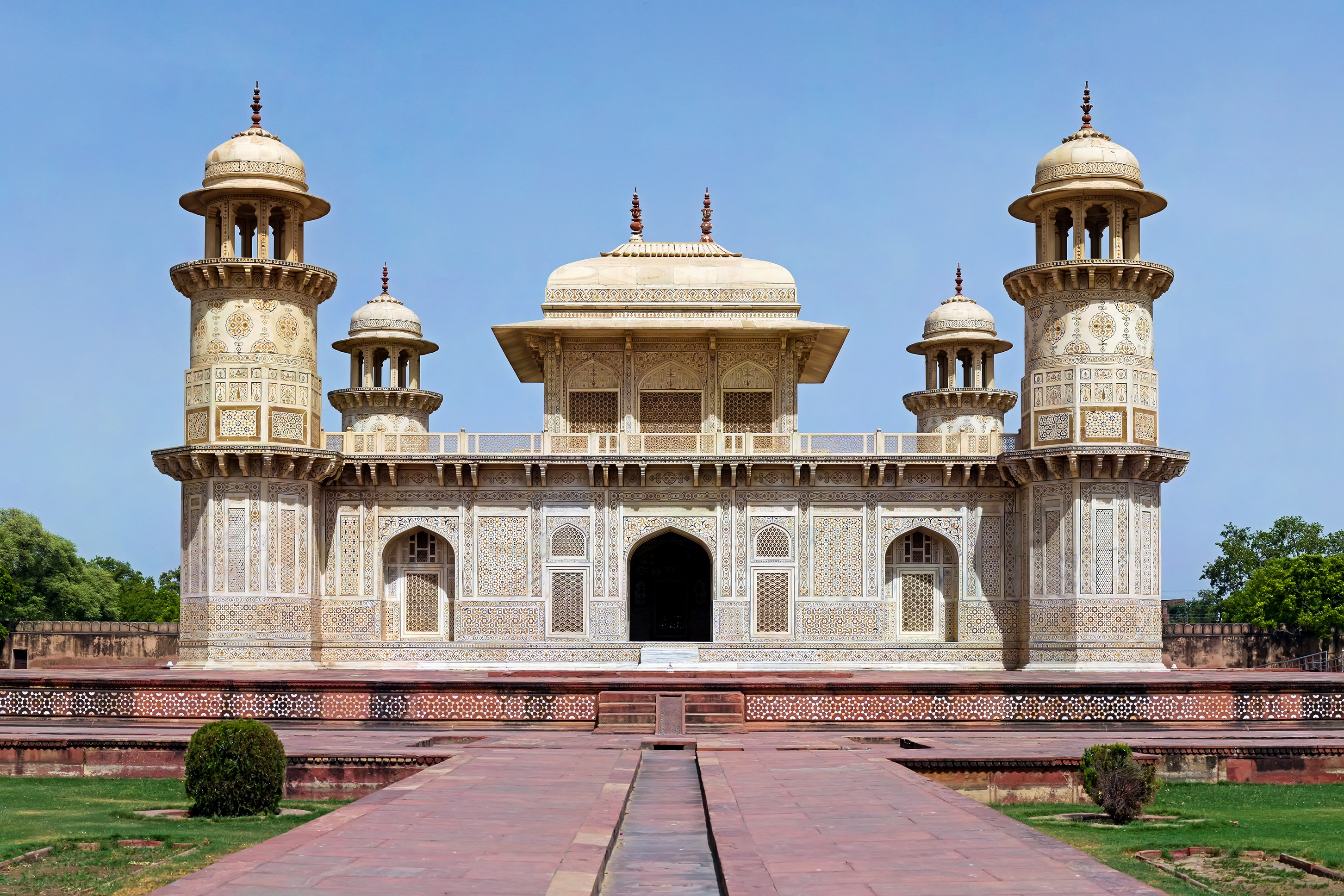
The I'timād-ud-Daulah's tomb

Nur Jahan commissioned I'timād-ud-Daulah's tomb, sometimes called the "Baby Taj", for her father, Mirza Ghiyas Beg, the Chief Minister of the Emperor Jahangir. Located on the left bank of the Yamuna river, the mausoleum is set in a large cruciform garden, crisscrossed by water courses and walkways. The area of the mausoleum itself is about 23 m^{2} (250 ft^{2}), and is built on a base that is about 50 m^{2} (540 ft^{2}) and about one metre (3.3 feet) high. On each corner are hexagonal towers, about thirteen metres (43 feet) tall. Small in comparison to many other Mughal-era tombs, it is sometimes described as a jewel box. Its garden layout and use of white marble, pietra dura, inlay designs, and latticework presage many elements of the Taj Mahal.

The walls are white marble from Rajasthan encrusted with semi-precious stone decorations – cornelian, jasper, lapis lazuli, onyx, and topaz in images of cypress trees and wine bottles or more elaborate decorations like cut fruit or vases containing bouquets. Light penetrates the interior through delicate Jali screens of intricately carved white marble.

=== Akbar's Tomb, Sikandra ===
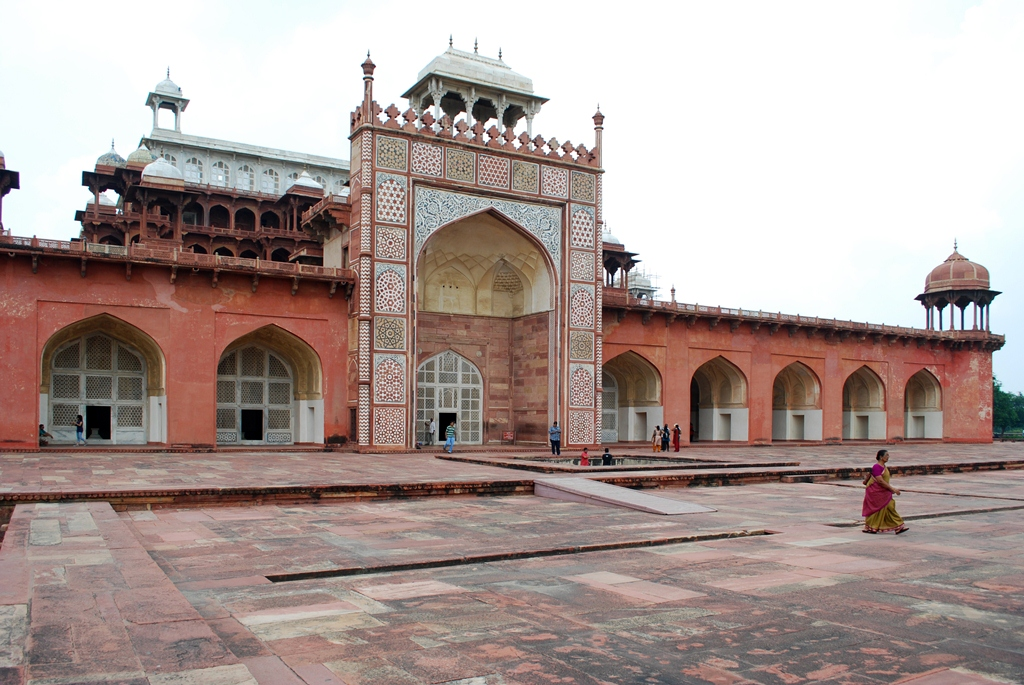
Tomb of Akbar the Great

Sikandra, the last resting place of the Mughal Emperor Akbar the Great, is on the Delhi-Agra Highway, about 13 kilometres (8.1 miles) from the Agra Fort. The four-storied tomb combines both marble and sandstone in its exterior. The construction of Sikandra was commenced in Akbar's reign and was completed by his heir and son Jahangir in 1613. The tomb is set amidst a large garden and is enclosed by four battlemented walls, each with a large gateway. The 99 names of Allah have been inscribed on the tomb. The tomb has seen some damage to its minarets and other aspects, which was inflicted in 1688 by the Jats under Rajaram Jat, to avenge his uncle Gokula Jat, who was executed by the Mughal Emperor Aurangzeb. The Jats plundered the tomb's gold, jewels, silver, and carpets, and also burned Akbar's bones. The vast gardens around Sikandra are inhabited by several Blackbucks, which are in the process of being shifted to the Etawah Safari Park. Next to Akbar's tomb, stands the Tomb of Mariam-uz-Zamani, the favourite wife of Akbar.

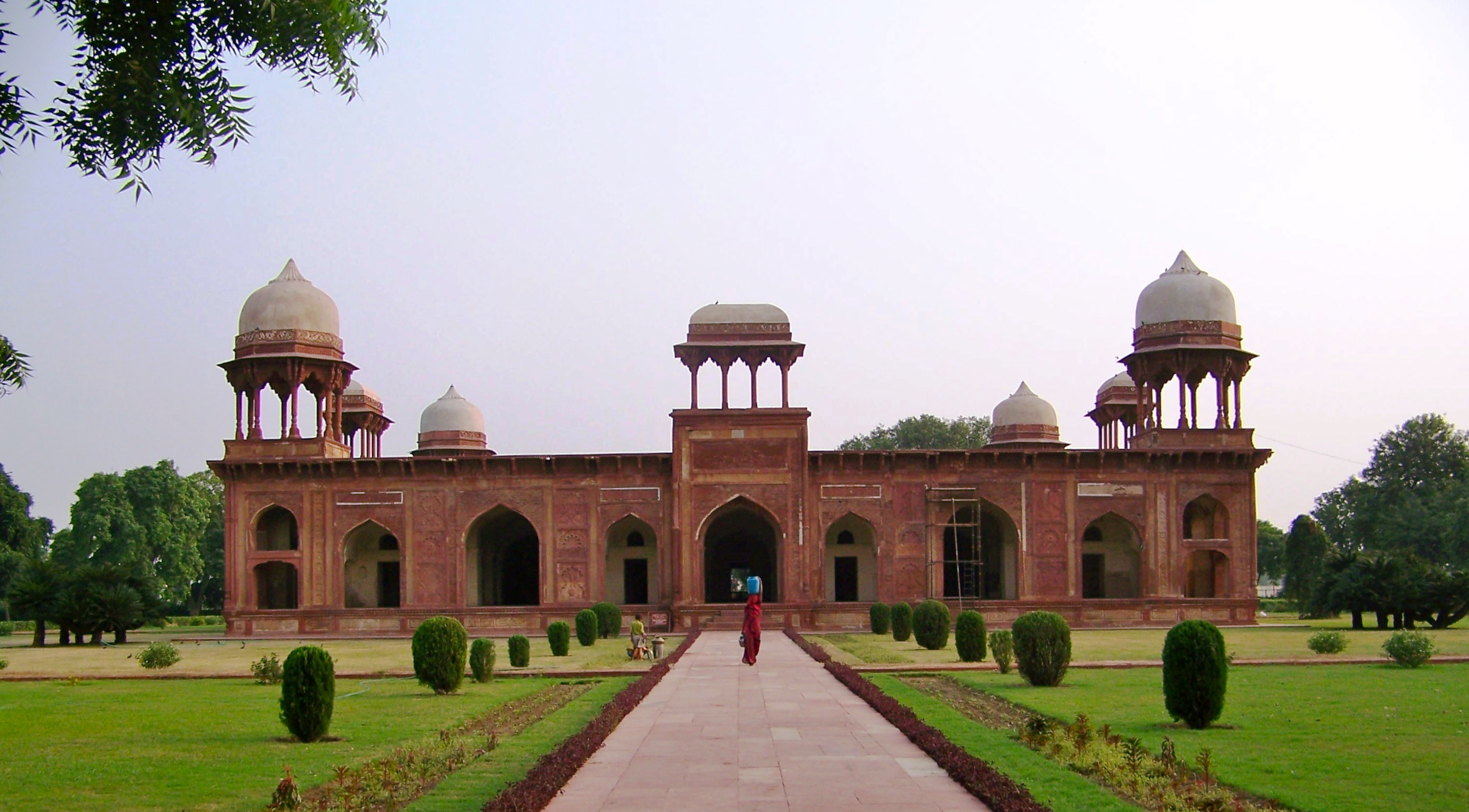
Tomb of Mariam-uz-Zamani

=== Other places of Interest ===
Agra also has several other places of interest, most of them from its Mughal past. These include the Battis Khamba, Jama Masjid, Chini Ka Rauza, Aram Bagh, Mariam's Tomb, and Mehtab Bagh among others.

The Jama Masjid is a large mosque attributed to Shah Jahan's daughter Jahanara Begum, built in 1648 and notable for its unusual dome and the absence of minarets. The Chini Ka Rauza, notable for its Persian influenced dome of blue glazed tiles, is dedicated to the prime minister of Shah Jahan, Afzal Khan. The Aram Bagh, commonly known as Ram Bagh today, is one of the oldest Mughal garden in India, and was built by the Mughal emperor Babur in 1528 on the bank of the Yamuna. It lies about 2.3 km (1 mi) north of the Taj Mahal. The original name of the gardens was Aram Bagh, or 'Garden of Relaxation', and this was where Babur used to spend his leisure time. Tomb of Mariam-uz-Zamani is the tomb of Mariam, the favourite wife of Emperor Akbar. The tomb is within the compound of the Christian Missionary Society. The Mehtab Bagh, or 'Moonlight Garden', is on the opposite bank of the River Yamuna from the Taj Mahal. Agra also has a nearby bird sanctuary, Keetham Lake. Also known as Sur Sarovar Bird Sanctuary, it is situated within the Surdas Reserved Forest. The lake has nearly two dozen varieties of migratory and resident birds.

==== City ====
- Shahi Hammam, Agra
- Jahangiri Mahal
- Mina Mosque
- Moti Masjid (Agra Fort)
- Musamman Burj (Agra Fort)
- Nagina Masjid
- Shah Jahani Mahal
- Throne of Jahangir
- Dayal Bagh Temple
- Mankameshwar Temple
- Aram Bagh, Agra
- Chini Ka Rauza
- Akbar's Church
- Jama Mosque, Agra
- Jaswant Ki Chhatri
- Mehtab Bagh
- Gyarah Sidi
- Black Taj Mahal
- Ram Barat
- Taj Mahotsav
- Paliwal Park

==== Around ====
- Tomb of Mariam-uz-Zamani
- Fatehpur Sikri
- Buland Darwaza
- Panch Mahal, Fatehpur Sikri
- Tomb of Salim Chishti
- Ibadat Khana
- Maktab Khana
- Jama Mosque, Fatehpur Sikri
- Keetham Lake
- Bateshwar, Uttar Pradesh temples
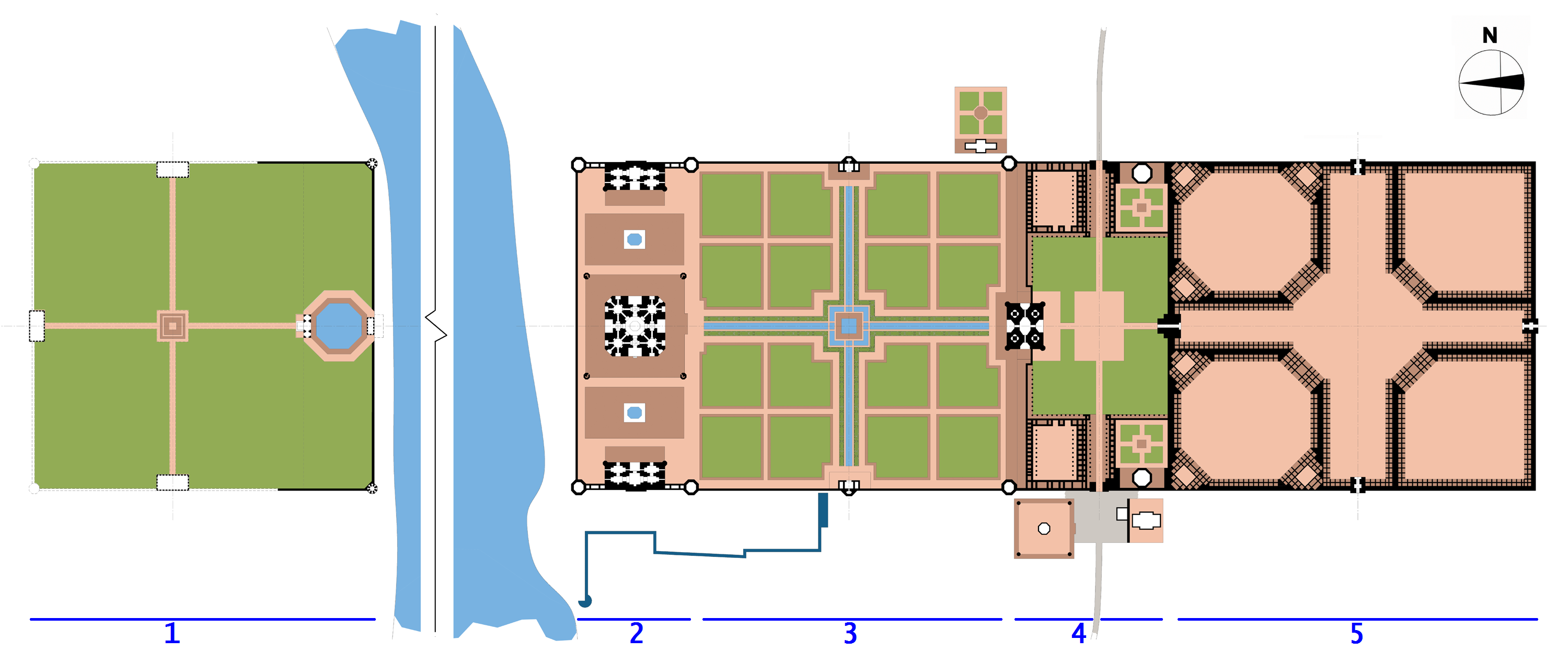
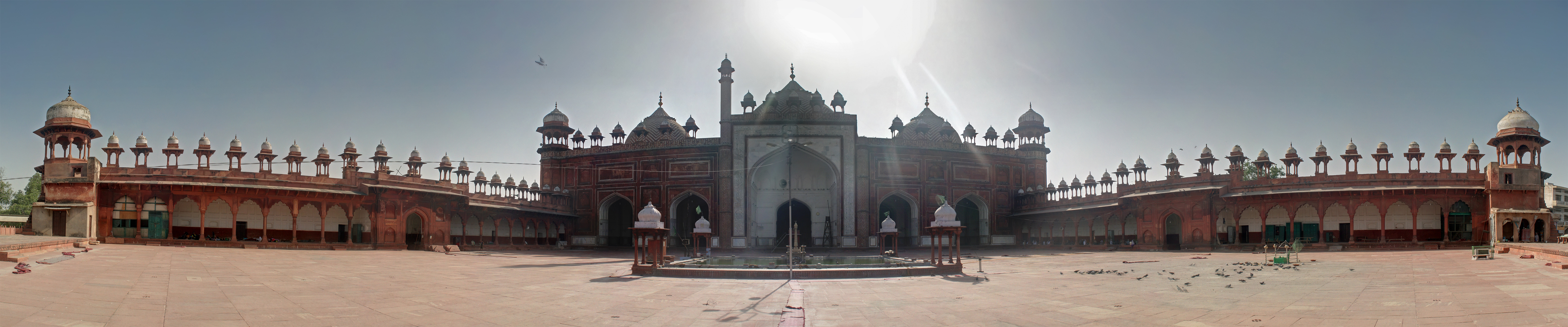
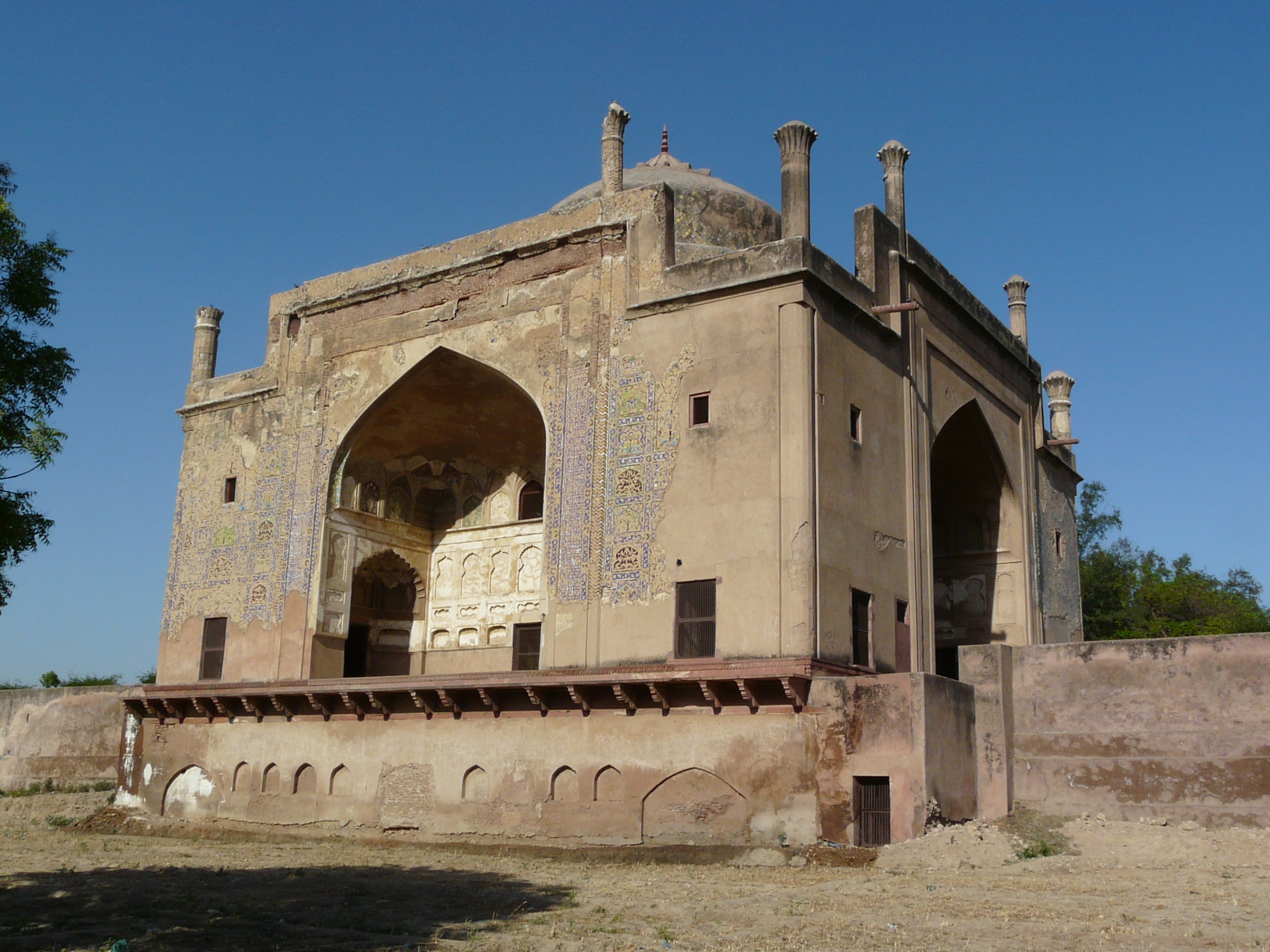
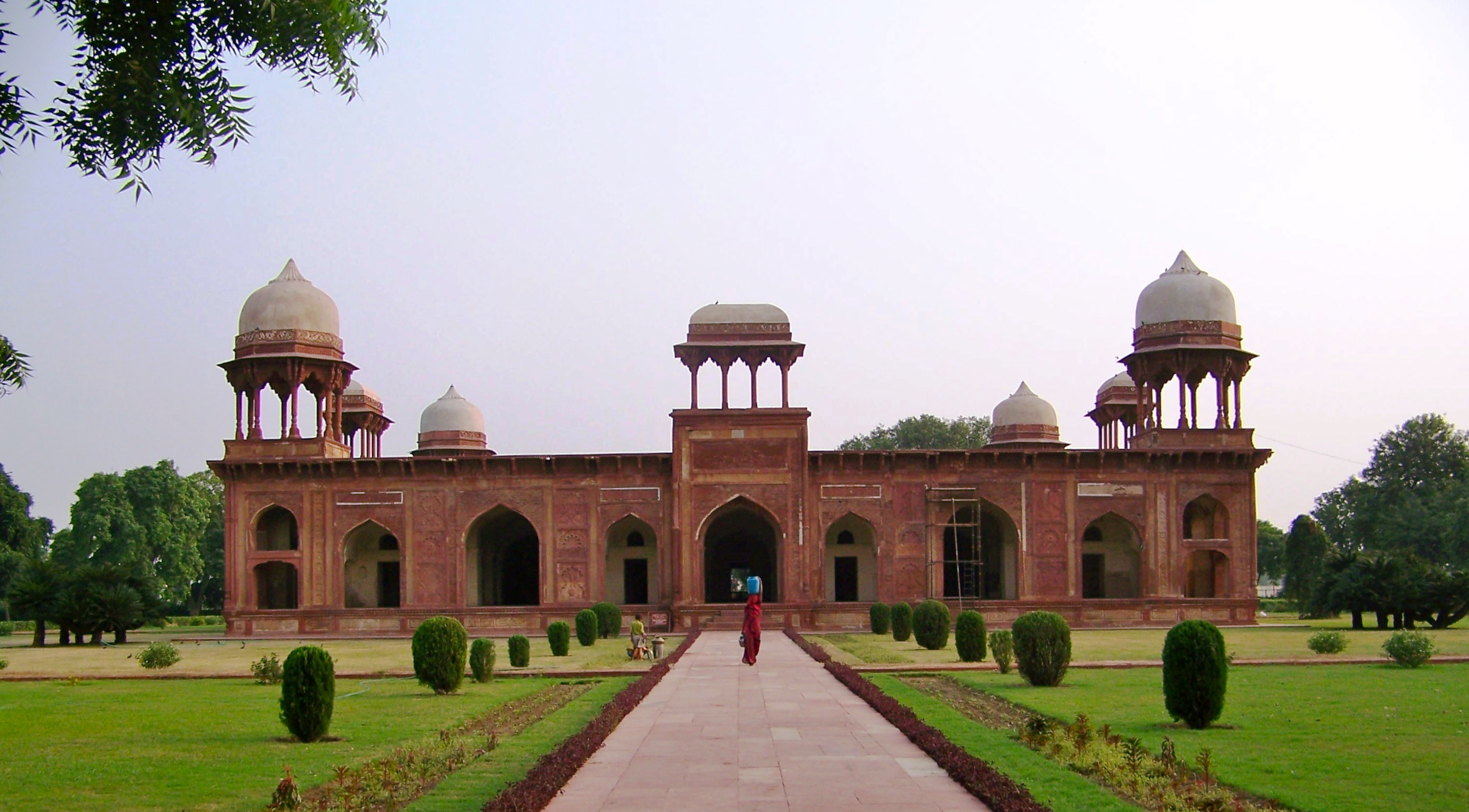
Other places of Interest. Clockwise from top: plan of the Taj Mahal Complex with the Mehtab Bagh gardens to the left; Jama Masjid; Chini Ka Rauza; and Tomb of Mariam-uz-Zamani.

== Culture ==
=== Cuisine ===
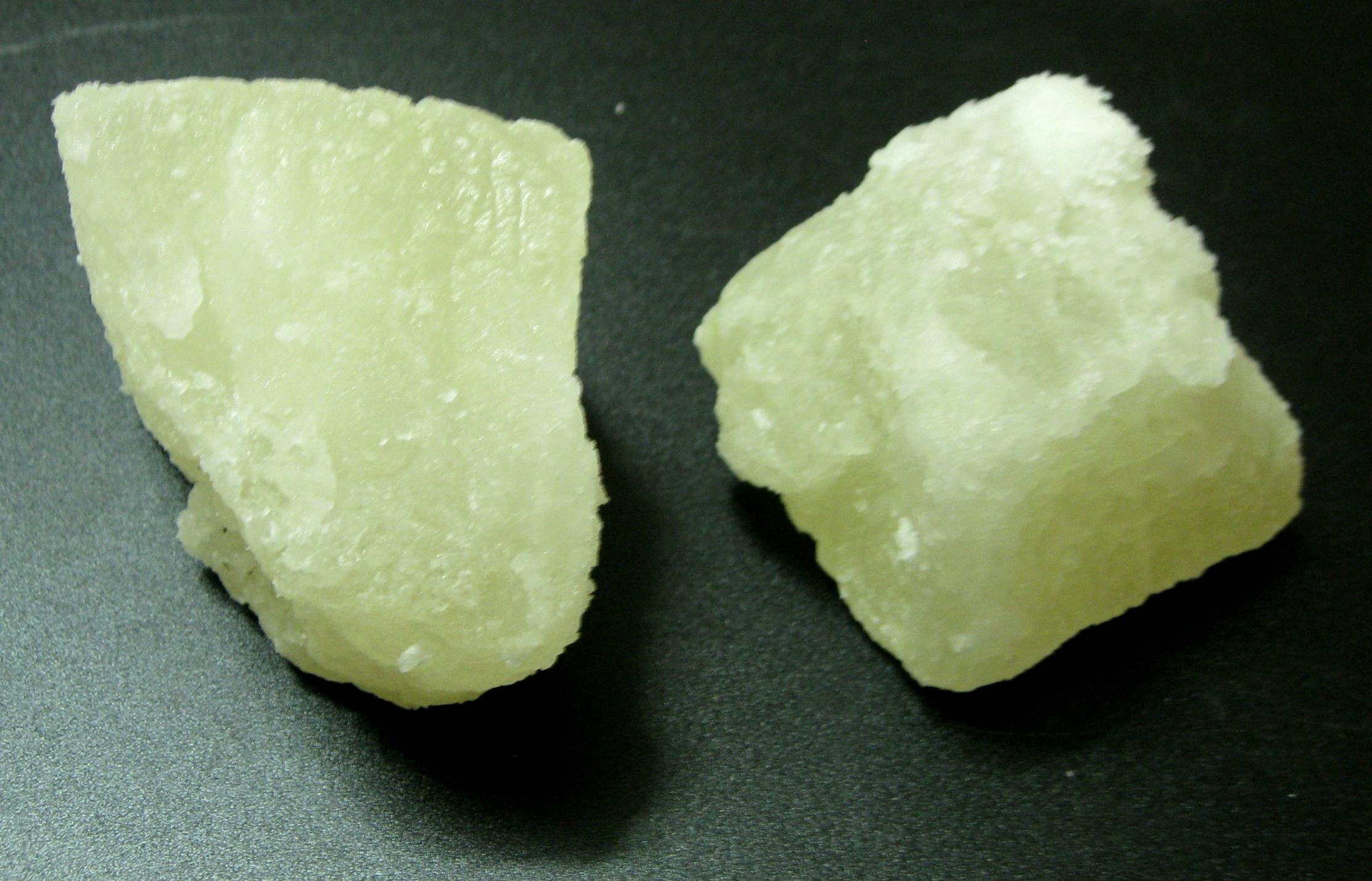
The sweet dish petha from Agra

Agra falls under Braj region and its local language is Braj Bhakha. Agra is known for its Braj cuisine and shares common culinary heritage with twin cities of Mathura and Vrindavan. Among Muslims of Agra, non vegetarian food is popular. Petha, a sweet made using ash gourd, is one of the famous dishes of Agra, and is available in many varieties. Another dish that is endemic to Agra is dalmoth, which is a dry snack made with spicy fried dal (lentils), nuts and raisins. The breakfast specialties include Bedai, which is a puffy kachori (made with all purpose flour, which is deep fried) with spicy filling inside and is generally served with spicy aloo bhaaji and dahi (curd). Equally popular as a snack is chaat, a collective term which includes snacks like dahi bhalla, raj kachori, samosas, and gol gappa, among others. Paratha, a pan fried flat wheat bread which is stuffed with potatoes, cauliflower, carrots or chhena, is also popular, and eaten accompanied with curd, pickle and chutney.

Beyond the petha, Agra's cuisine is a blend of Mughal and local flavours. Unique street foods such as bhalla (dahi aloo tikki) from Sadar Bazaar, bedai with jalebi in the mornings, and tandoori chai in clay cups are popular among locals.

=== Taj Mahotsav ===
Taj Mahotsav is a cultural festival and craft fair that was started in the year 1992 and has grown since then. The year 2019 was the 28th year of this Mahotsav. The fair is held in a big field in Shilpgram, near the eastern gate of the Taj Mahal. This festival also figures in the calendar of events of the Department of Tourism, Government of India. A large number of Indian and foreign tourists coming to Agra join this festivity. One of the objectives of this craft fair is to provide encouragement to the artisans. It also makes available works of art and craft at reasonable prices that are not inflated by high maintenance cost. The Mahotsav is hosted from 18 to 27 February every year. The theme for the 2020 Taj Mahotsav was Sanskriti ke Rang, Taj ke Sang. For the first time since 1992, Taj Mahotsav 2021 has been cancelled, because of tourism restrictions during the COVID-19 pandemic.

== Transport ==
=== Air ===
As of April 2021, Indigo operates regular flights between Agra Airport and Mumbai, Ahmedabad, Bhopal, and Bangalore. The Agra Airport at Kheria is controlled by the Indian Air Force.

For international and expanded domestic travel, the city is served by major hubs in the National Capital Region:

- Indira Gandhi International Airport (Delhi): Located approximately 200 kilometres (120 mi) away, it remains the primary international gateway for Agra via the Yamuna Expressway.
- Noida International Airport (Jewar): Inaugurated on 28 March 2026, this airport is located significantly closer to Agra (approximately 140 kilometres (87 mi)). It is expected to become a major secondary hub for the region, with commercial flight operations scheduled to commence in April 2026.

=== Rail ===
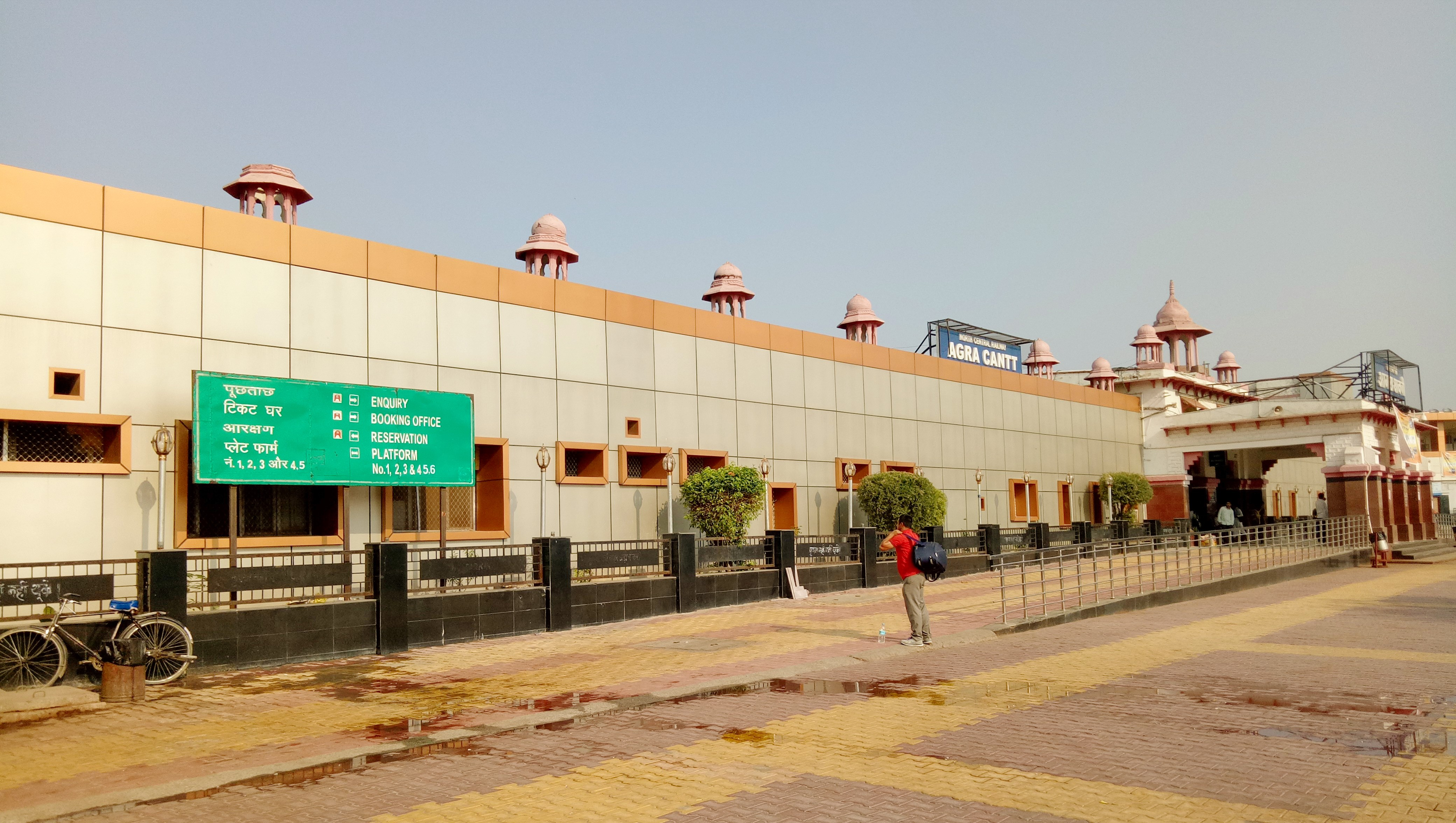
Agra Cantt Railway Station

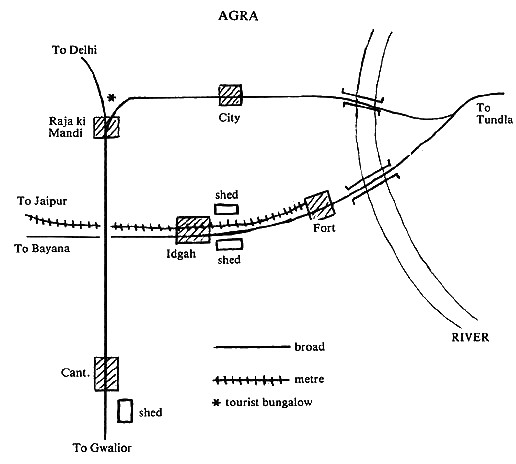
Railway Map of Agra (the line to Jaipur has meanwhile been converted to broad gauge)

The city of Agra is served by 7 railway stations, viz., Agra Cantonment (major station for Delhi - Mumbai line), Raja-Ki-Mandi, Agra Fort (Major station for Jodhpur - Howrah Line), Idgah, Agra City, Jamuna Bridge, and Billochpura. It comes under the jurisdiction of the Agra Division of North Central Railways Zone of the Indian Railways. The city is served by multiple mail/express trains, as well as Rajdhani, Shatabdi, and Gatiman express. The Gatiman express is India's first semi-high train speed service, and has cut travel time between Agra and Delhi to 100 minutes. Being a major tourist destination, Agra is also served by the luxury train Maharajas' Express.

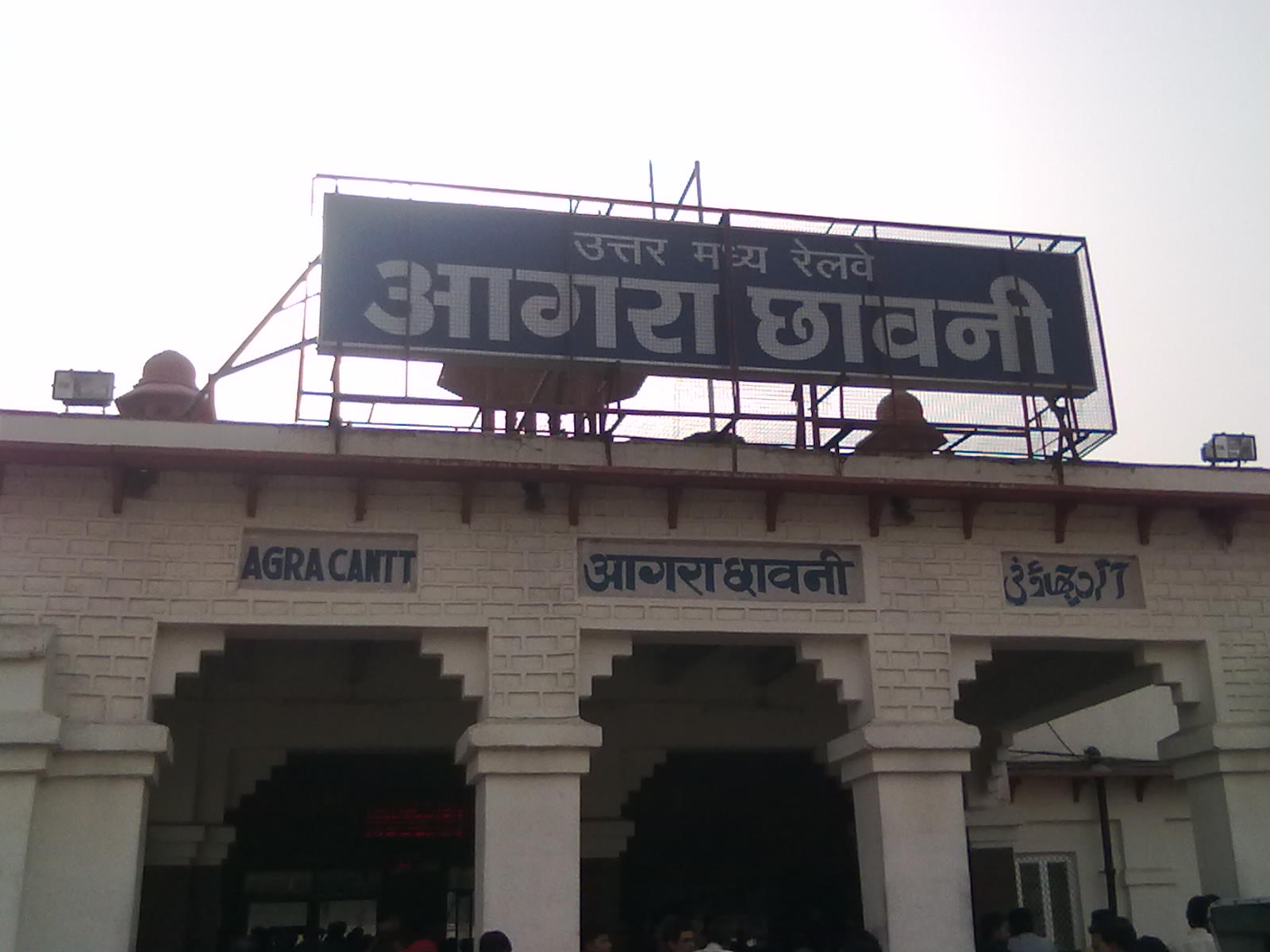
Agra Cantonment railway station

=== Road ===
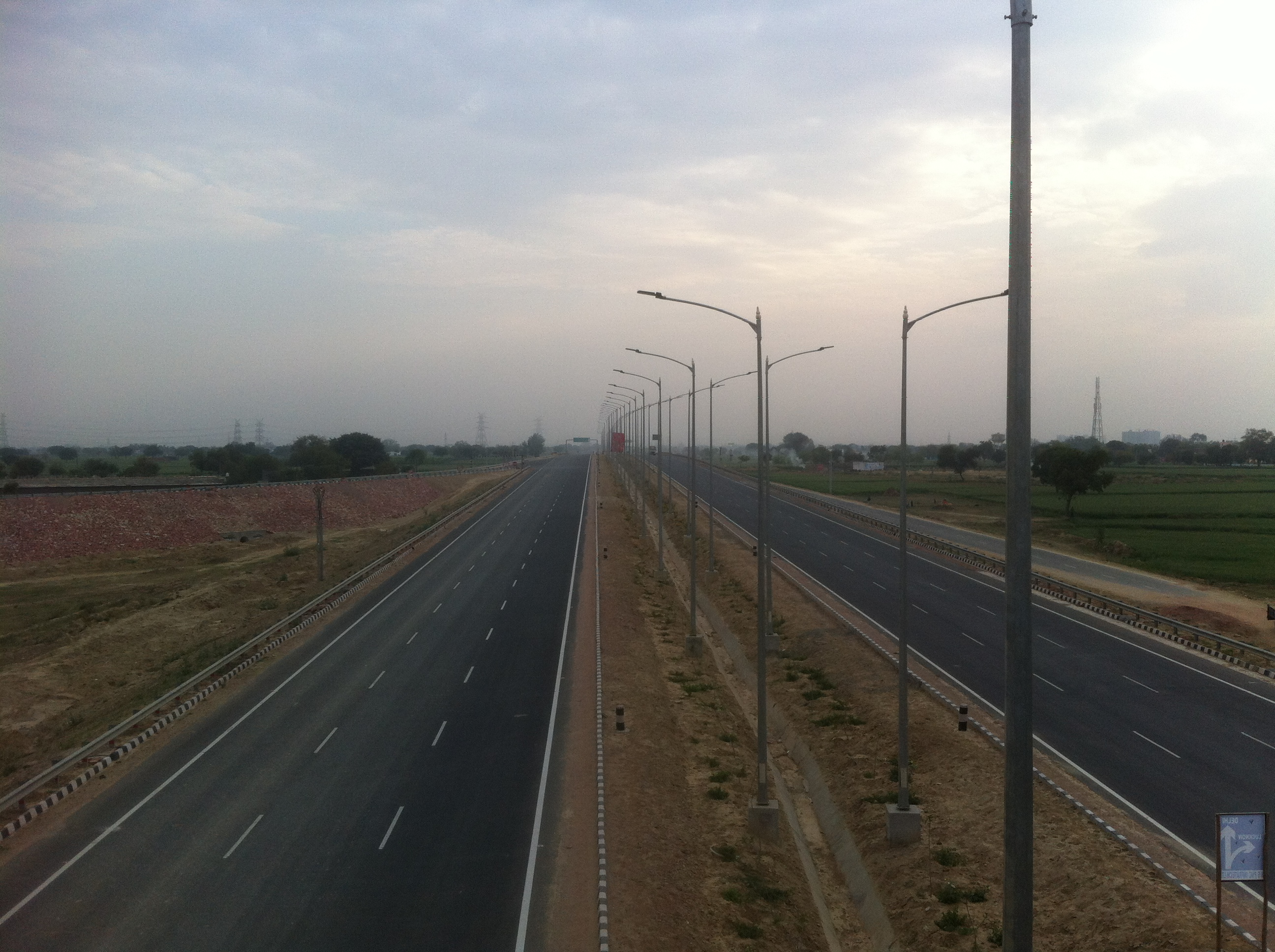
Inner Ring Road link Yamuna Expressway to Lucknow expressway, Fatehabad Road, Shamshabad Road, NH-3, NH-11 Agra

Inter-State Bus Terminal (I.S.B.T.), Idgah Bus Stand, Taj Depot and Fort Depot are the major bus stands in Agra, connecting Agra to most of the bigger cities in northern India. It is a major junction of highways with three national highways and two expressways (Yamuna Expressway and Agra Lucknow Expressway) originating from Agra.

- From Delhi: NH 19 (old number: NH 2), a modern divided highway, connects the 200 km (124 mi) distance from Delhi to Agra.
- From Delhi / Noida: Yamuna Expressway, a modern access controlled highway connects the 200 km (124 mi) distance from Delhi to Agra.
- Yamuna Expressway (formerly Taj Expressway) is a six lane, 165 km (103 mi) long, controlled-access expressway, that connects New Delhi with Agra via Greater Noida and Mathura in the Indian state of Uttar Pradesh.
- NH 509 (old number: NH 93) connects Agra to Moradabad via Aligarh.
- Section of NH 44 (old number: NH 3 Agra Mumbai national highway) connects Agra to Gwalior via Dholpur.
- NH 21 (old number: NH 11 Agra Jaipur Highway) connects Jaipur to Bareilly via Agra.
- Agra Lucknow Expressway is a six lane, 302 km (188 mi) long, controlled-access expressway, that connects Lucknow with Agra via Kannauj and Etawah in the Indian state of Uttar Pradesh.

Bus services are run by the UPSRTC. Other para-transit modes include rickshaws.

Polluting vehicles are not allowed near the Taj Mahal. Within the city, Mahatma Gandhi Marg is the main artery.

=== Agra Metro ===
Rail India Technical and Economic Service (RITES) had proposed 30 stations, 11 underground and 19 elevated, for two corridors of the Metro Rail in the city. The two lines are Sikandra to the Taj Mahal's east gate via Agra Fort and Agra Cantt to Kalindi Vihar. On 24 March 2017, State Chief Minister Yogi Aditya Nath approved the project. In December 2017, the cabinet of the UP Government approved the DPR as per New Metro Policy. Prime Minister Narendra Modi laid the foundation stone of Agra Metro on 8 March 2019.

As of January 2025, the Agra Metro project has made significant progress: the Priority Corridor, a 6 km stretch from Taj East Gate to Jama Masjid with 6 stations, began operations on 6 March 2024. This section includes 3 elevated stations (Taj East Gate, Basai, and Fatehabad Road) and 3 underground stations (Taj Mahal, Agra Fort, and Jama Masjid). Construction is ongoing for the remaining sections of Phase 1, which consists of two lines:

==== Yellow Line (Line 1) ====
- Total length: 14.25 km (6.569 km elevated, 7.681 km underground)
- 14 stations (6 elevated, 7 underground)
- Current status: 6 km operational, remaining under construction
- Expected completion: 2026

==== Blue Line (Line 2) ====
- Total length: 15.40 km (fully elevated)
- 15 stations (all elevated)
- Current status: Under construction
- Expected completion: December 2025

==== Recent developments ====
1. Tunnelling progress: As of January 2025, 16 breakthroughs have been achieved for the Agra Metro Phase 1 project. The final breakthrough on a 2.2 km upline tunnel was recently completed by a 6.61-m diameter Earth Pressure Balance Tunnel Boring Machine (EPBM).
2. Civil works: Construction is progressing on the elevated viaduct and stations for both lines. For example, the AGCC-05 package, which includes a 3.725 km elevated section connecting RBS Ramp in Khandari to Sikandra, is currently underway.
3. Contracts: Larsen & Toubro (L&T) was awarded a Rs. 1,242.79 crore contract in September 2024 for the civil construction of Line-2, which will be executed under package AGCC-07.
4. Funding: The project is partially financed by a €450 million loan from the European Investment Bank (EIB).
5. Environmental certification: All stations on the priority corridor have received the Platinum Rating from the Indian Green Building Council (IGBC), making Agra Metro a Green Mass Rapid Transit System (GMRTS).

The entire Phase 1 project, estimated to cost ₹8,379.62 crore (approx. US$930 million), is expected to be completed by 2026.

== Education ==
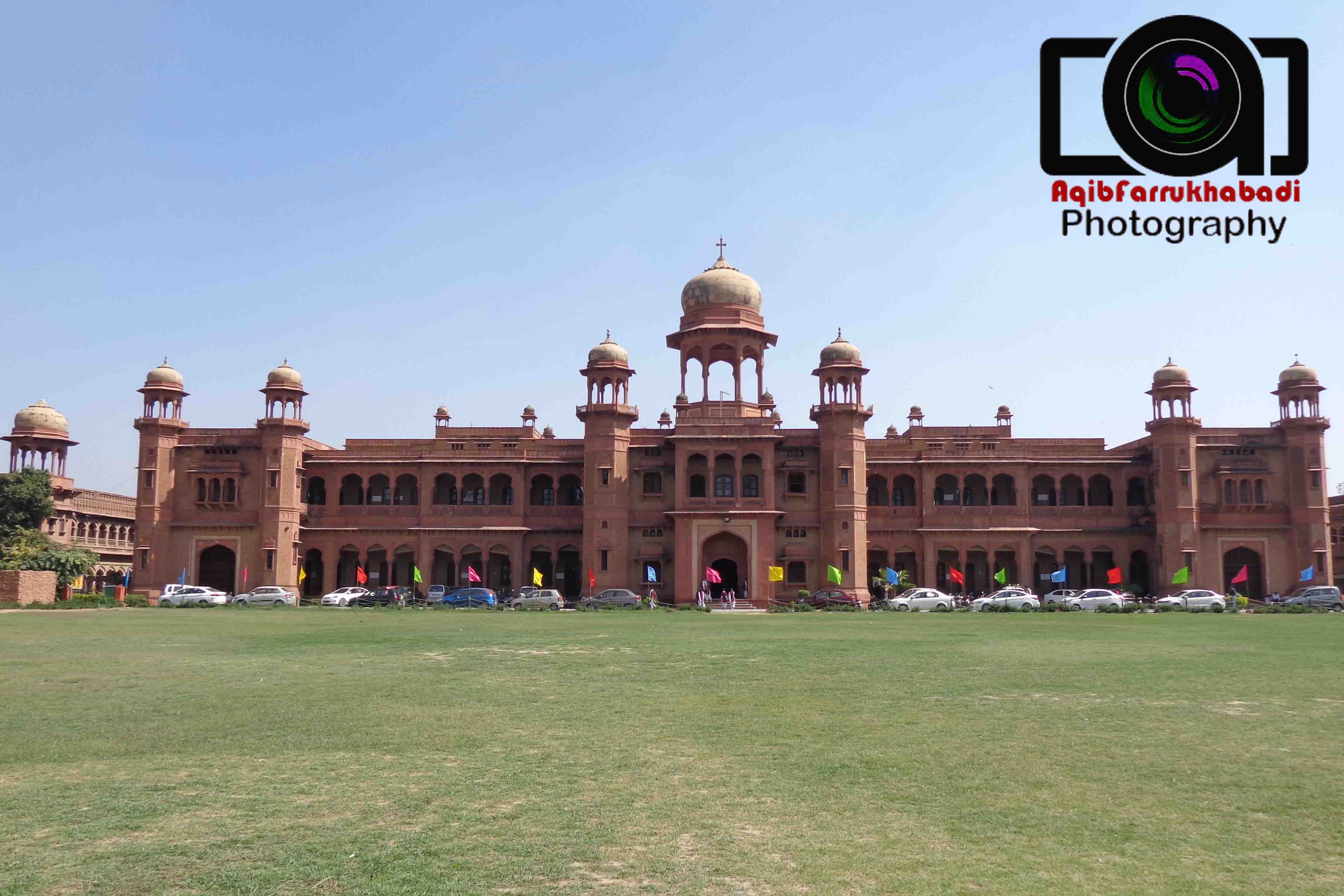
Agra University

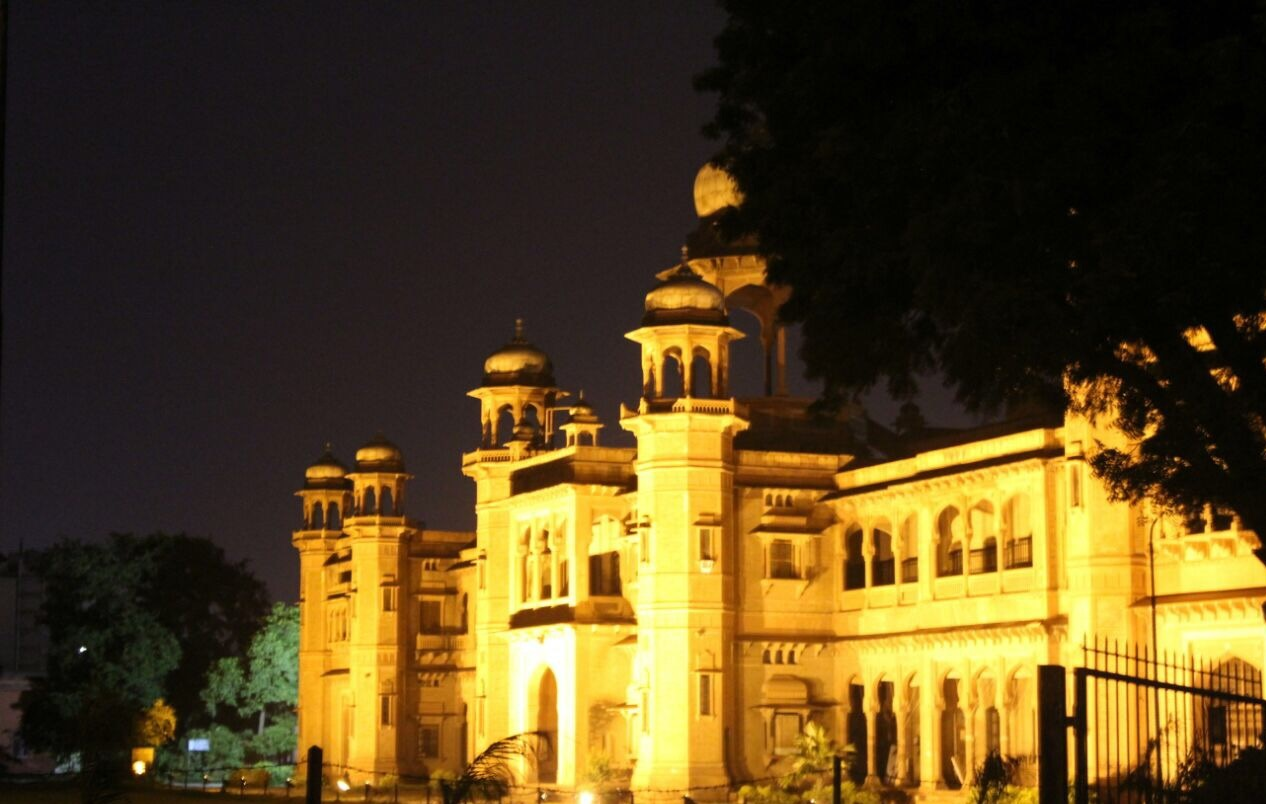
St John College

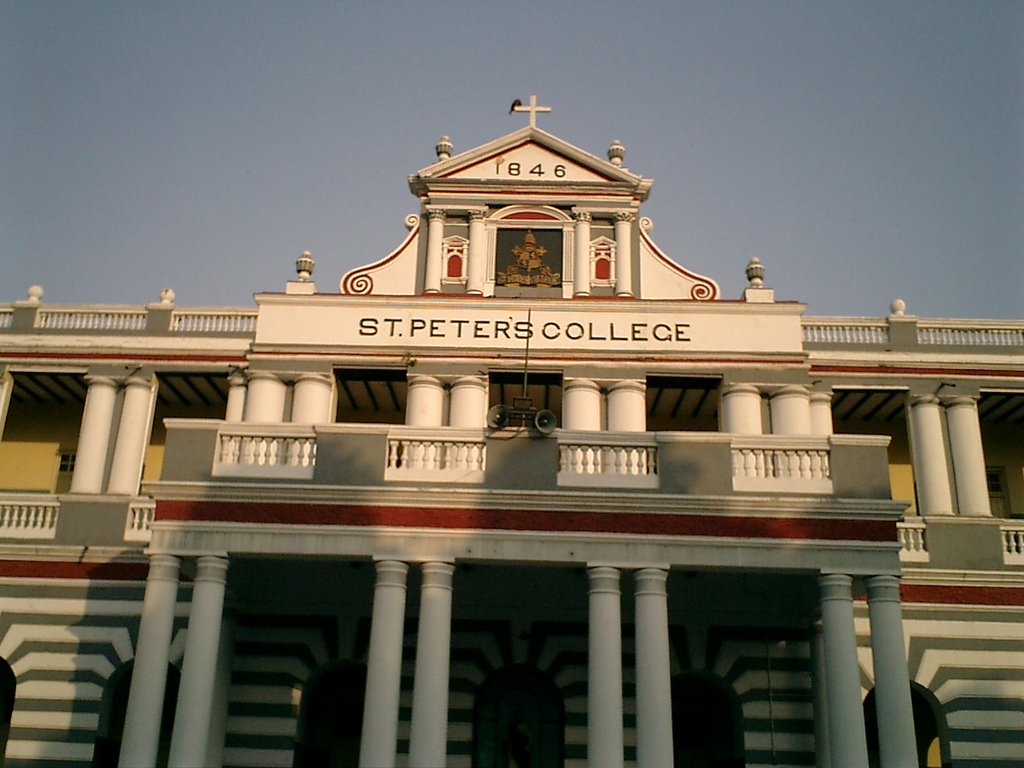
St Peter's College

=== Universities and colleges ===
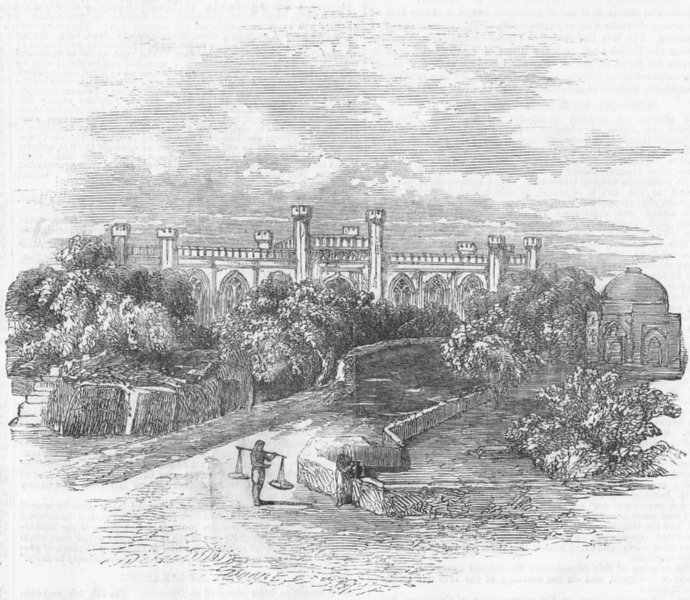
Agra College

Agra University was established on 1 July 1927 and catered to colleges spread across the United Provinces, the Rajputana, the Central Provinces and almost to entire northern India. There are 10 institutes comprising various departments and around 700 Colleges are affiliated to this university. The historic Agra University was later rechristened as Dr. Bhimrao Ambedkar University by the then Chief Minister of Uttar Pradesh, Mayawati.

- The Institute of Mental Health and Hospital, formerly known as Agra Lunatic Asylum, was established in September 1859 governed by the State of Uttar Pradesh. It is spread over an extensive ground of 172.8 acres (69.9 ha) land and is well-known centre for the treatment, training, and research on mental disorders in Northern India. The institute was renamed as Mental Hospital, Agra in 1925. Presently all admissions and discharges are being done under the provisions of Mental Health Act, 1987.
- Central Institute of Hindi (also known as Kendriya Hindi Sansthan) is an autonomous institute under Ministry of Human Resource Development, Government of India engaged in teaching Hindi as a foreign and second language. Apart from running residential Hindi language courses for foreign students, the institute also conducts regular training programmes for teachers of Hindi belonging to non-Hindi states of India. The institute is situated at an 11 acres (4.5 ha) campus on the outskirts of Agra city. Headquartered in Agra the institute has eight regional centres in Delhi, Hyderabad, Mysore, Shillong, Dimapur, Guwahati, Ahmedabad and Bhubneshwar. The institute is the only government-run institution in India established solely for research and teaching of Hindi as a foreign and second language.
- Sarojini Naidu Medical College, located in Agra, is one of the three oldest medical colleges of India. It is named after the first lady Governess of Uttar Pradesh, poet and freedom fighter, Bharat Kokila Smt. Sarojini Naidu.
- Agra College is one of the oldest institutions in India. Pandit Gangadhar Shastri, a noted Sanskrit scholar, founded the college in 1823. Until 1883 the institute was a government college, and after that a board of trustees and a Committee of Management managed the college. Agra College produced the first graduate in Uttar Pradesh and the first Law graduate to Northern India.
- St. John's College, Agra, is a college established in 1850, now part of the Dr. Bhim Rao Ambedkar University, earlier known as Agra University. It is amongst the oldest Christian colleges in India. The college runs a study centre of Indira Gandhi National Open University, a central university.

=== Schools ===
- St. George's College, Agra, is one of the oldest convent schools in India. It is a Minority Anglo-Indian Christian Institution granted Minority Rights under Article 30 of the Indian Constitution. It is located near Mall Road and near to Targhar.
- St. Peter's College, Agra, founded in the year 1846, is one of the oldest convent schools in India. It is a Roman Catholic Institution granted Minority Rights under Article 30 of the Indian Constitution.

== Media ==
Agra is home to the Dainik Jagran newspaper, the most read Hindi newspaper in India. Other widely read papers include Amar Ujala, Rajasthan Patrika, Aaj, Hindustan, The Sea Express, daily Amar Bharti, Deepsheel Bharat, and DLA. The English dailies published are The Times of India, Hindustan Times, Economic Times, and The Pioneer. The Urdy dailies published are Prabhanjan Sanket and Inksaaf. There is also the Hindi and English mixed newspaper tabloid I-Next.

Radio stations
Frequency	Station
90.4 MHz	Agra ki Awaaz
90.8 MHz	Aap ki Awaaz
93.7 MHz	Fever FM
91.9 MHz	Radio City
92.7 MHz	Big 92.7 FM
94.5 MHz	Tadka FM
105.6 MHz	GNOU Gyan Vani

State-owned All India Radio has a local station in Agra which transmits various programs of mass interest. There are four private FM radio stations, 92.7 BIG FM (Reliance Broadcast Network Limited), 93.7 Fever FM, 94.5 Tadka FM, and Radio City 91.9 FM. There is a community Radio Station 90.4 FM.

== Notable people ==
- Aakash Chopra
- Abdul Karim (the Munshi)
- Alok Sharma
- Alvin Robert Cornelius
- Amritlal Nagar
- Anand Swarup
- Ashi Singh
- Dalip Tahil
- Deepak Chahar
- Deepti Sharma
- Dhruv Jurel
- Girraj Singh Dharmesh
- Hemlata Kala
- Jagan Prasad Garg
- Kalyan Das Jain
- Makund Behari Lal
- Mamnoon Hussain
- Mirza Ghalib
- Mir Taqi Mir
- Motilal Nehru
- Nazeer Akbarabadi
- Nimmi
- Poonam Yadav
- Raj Babbar
- Rajendra Yadav
- Rahul Chahar
- Ravi Tandon
- R. K. S. Bhadauria
- S. P. Singh Baghel
- Salig Ram
- Seth Achal Singh
- Shiv Dayal Singh

== Movies filmed in Agra ==
- Tevar
- Dream Girl
- Dream Girl 2
- Luka Chuppi
- Mere Brother Ki Dulhan
- Bareilly Ki Barfi
- Bunty aur Babli
- Atrangi Re
- Tere Naam
- Phir Aayi Hasseen Dillruba
- 12th Fail

== Sister cities ==
Agra is twinned with:

- Chengdu, Sichuan, China
- Petra, Jordan
- Tempe, Arizona, United States
- Samarkand, Uzbekistan

== See also ==
- Agra Graduates constituency
- Largest Indian cities by GDP
- Western Uttar Pradesh

Tehsils of Agra:

- Bah
- Etmadpur
- Fatehabad
- Kheragarh
