= Amar Singh =

Amar Singh may refer to:

== People ==
=== Military, politics, and leaders ===
- Amar Singh (general), 13th century military general of Brahmachal, greater Sylhet
- Amar Singh (Uttar Pradesh politician) (1956–2020), Indian politician
- Amar Singh (Punjab politician), MP for Fatehgarh Sahib, Punjab
- Amar Singh I (1559–1620), ruler of Mewar, Udaipur 1597-1620
- Amar Singh II (1672–1710), ruler of Mewar 1698–1710
- Amar Singh of Thanjavur (?-1802), Maratha Raja of Thanjavur 1793 - 1798
- Amar Singh Thapa (1751–1816), Badakaji of Nepal and commander of the Nepal Army
- Amar Singh Thapa (sardar) (1759–1814), Nepalese general and Governor of Palpa

=== Other people ===
- Amar Singh (art dealer) (born 1989), art dealer and activist
- Amar Singh (cricketer) (1910–1940), Indian test cricketer
- Amar Singh (humanitarian) (born 1983), Australian of the Year: Local Hero Recipient
- Amar Singh Chamkila (1961–1988), Punjabi singer, songwriter, musician, and composer
- Amar Singh Rathore (1613–1644), 17th-century nobleman
- Amar Singh Shaunki (1916–1981), singer

== Other uses ==
- Amar Singh College, Srinagar, Jammu and Kashmir

== See also ==
- Amar Singh Gate, another name for the Lahore Gate of Agra Fort
- Amarasimha, ancient Indian linguist
- Amarsinh, an Indian name
- Amerasinghe, a Sinhalese surname
