= Mahal (palace) =

Type of palace

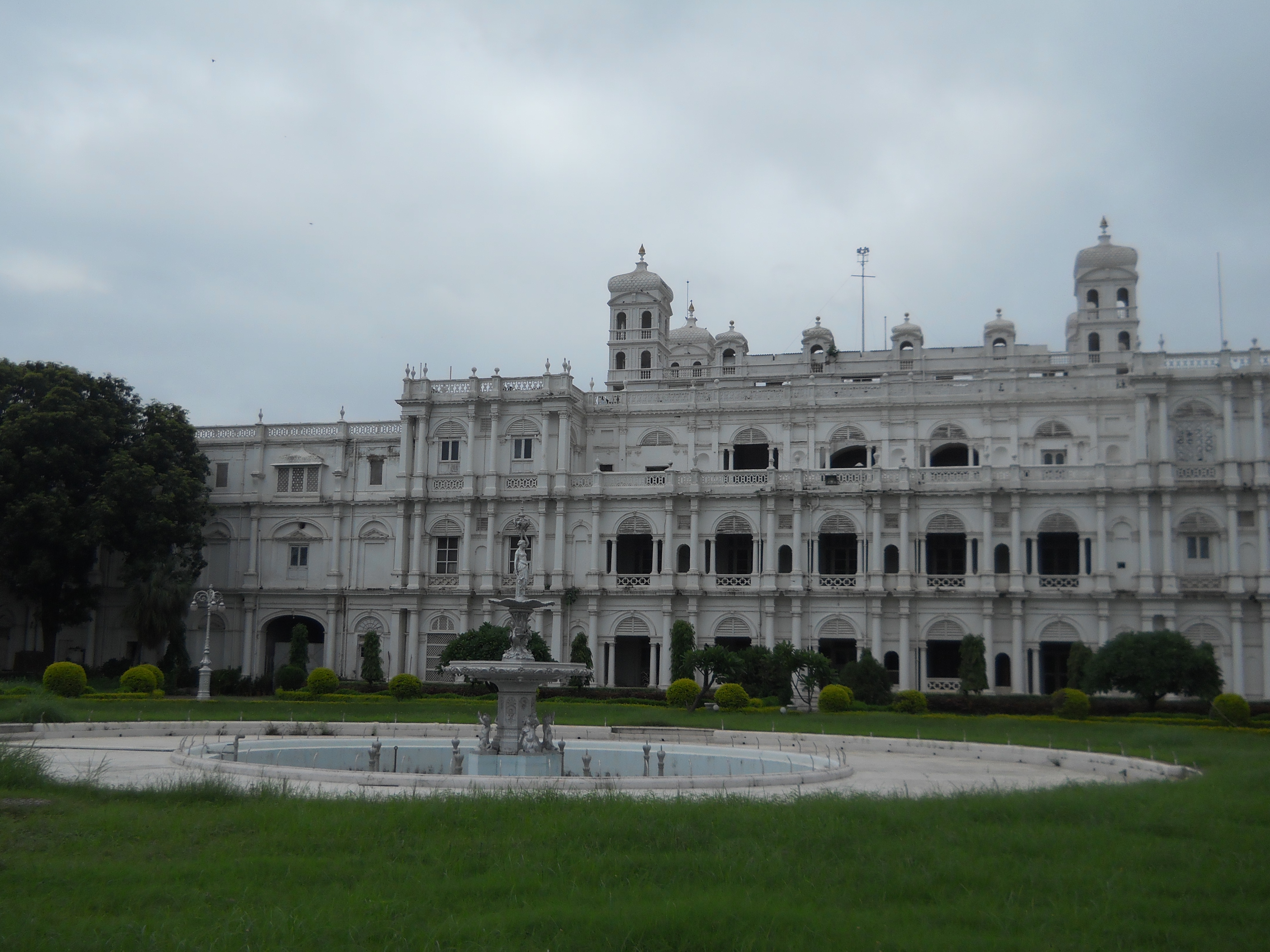
The Jai Vilas Mahal (Scindia Palace), Gwalior

Mahal (Hindustani pronunciation: [mə.ɦəl] or [mɛˈɦɛl]), meaning "a mansion or a palace", though it may also refer to "living quarters for a set of people". It is an Indian word which derives from the Persian word maḥal, deriving from the Arabic word maḥall which in turn is derived from ḥall ‘stopping place, abode’. A place of destination would therefore be referred to as "mahal anuzul". A place of recreation would be referred to as "mahal anunzul". The term máhal to refer to a place was also adopted in Hindustani (Hindi-Urdu) for example Panch Mahals and Jungle Mahals. The word developed its meaning for palace as in opposition to that of a jhompri or a "dilapidated house" as a neologism.

Muslim, Hindu and Sikh rulers alike built many mahals in the Indian subcontinent.

== Notable mahals ==
- Aina Mahal
- Hawa Mahal
- Hindola Mahal
- Jahangir Mahal, Orchha
- Jahangiri Mahal, named after the Mughal emperor Jahangir
- Jahaz Mahal
- Jal Mahal
- Lal Mahal
- Lalitha Mahal
- Noor Mahal
- Panch Mahal, Fatehpur Sikri
- Pari Mahal
- Prag Mahal
- Shah Jahani Mahal (a part of the Agra Fort), named after the Mughal emperor Shah Jahan
- Sheesh Mahal (a part of the Lahore Fort), a palace used by the Mughal dynasty
- Taj Mahal, Agra
- Thirumalai Nayakkar Mahal
- Zafar Mahal
