= Amerasinghe =

Amerasinghe අමරසිංහ
- Pronunciation: Amarasiṁha
- Language: Sinhala

Origin
- Region of origin: Sri Lanka

Other names
- Alternative spelling: Amarasinghe

Amerasinghe or Amarasinghe (Sinhala: අමරසිංහ, romanized: Amarasiṁha) is a Sinhalese surname.

== Notable people ==
- Felix Amerasinghe (1948–2005), Sri Lankan entomologist
- Gunapala Amarasinghe (born 1954), Sri Lankan academic
- Hamilton Shirley Amerasinghe (1913–1980), Sri Lankan diplomat
- Ishara Amerasinghe (born 1978), Sri Lankan cricketer
- Jayantha Amerasinghe (born 1954), Sri Lankan cricketer
- Karunaratne Amarasinghe, Sri Lankan broadcaster
- Mahendra Amerasinghe, Sri Lankan cricketer
- Malinga Amarasinghe (born 1997), Sri Lankan cricketer
- Niroshana Amarasinghe (born 1982), Sri Lankan cricketer
- P. Amarasinghe (died 2007), Sri Lankan banker
- Rohan Amarasinghe, Sri Lankan navy officer
- Somawansa Amarasinghe (1943–2016), Sri Lankan politician
- Sumana Amarasinghe (born 1948), Sri Lankan actress
