= Khas Mahal (disambiguation) =

Khas Mahal refers to Khas Mahal, wife of Jahangir

It may also refer to

- Khas Mahal (Red Fort)
- Khas Mahal (Agra Fort)
