= Shahi Hammam, Agra =

Historical site in Agra, India

Shahi Hammam is a Mughal-era bathhouse located in Chipitola, Agra, constructed by Alivardi Khan in 1620. Once part of a larger inn complex, the hammam served not only as a bathing facility but also as a cultural and social center.

== Architecture ==
The Shahi Hammam is a 16th-century Mughal-era bathhouse constructed using Lahore bricks and red sandstone.The hammam features Turkish architectural style, characterised by its design and intricate details. Located near Agra Fort, the structure reflects the grandeur of Mughal architecture and serves as a testament to the cultural and social practices of the time.

== In books ==
It is mentioned in historical texts, including "The Traveller Guide to Agra" by Satya Chandra Mukherjee and "Historical and Descriptive Agra" by Syed Mohd Lateef.

== Social movements ==
In 2024, heritage enthusiasts started advocating for the preservation of the Shahi Hammam, citing concerns that its loss would mark the fourth such structure of historical significance to be lost in the area. Despite its cultural value and unique Persian architectural features, the site is not listed among the protected heritage sites by the Archaeological Survey of India (ASI).
