= Amarpal Singh (disambiguation) =

The name Amarpal Singh may refer to

- Amarpal Singh Aam Aadmi Party Punjab politician
- Amarpal Singh Ajnala Shiromani Akali Dal Punjab politician
- Amar Pal Singh BJP UP politician

== See also ==
- Amar Singh (disambiguation)
