= Divan (architecture) =

Type of reception hall

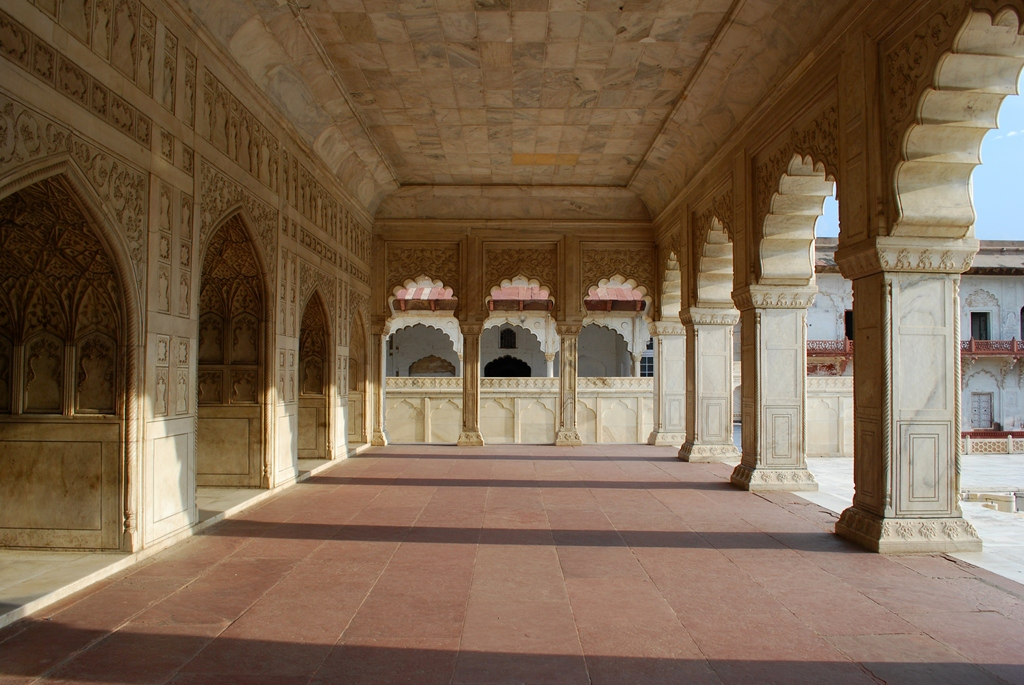
Diwan-i-Khas at Agra Fort

Divan or Diwan is a term of Persian origin referring to various types of reception halls. The term occurs in various examples of Islamic architecture, where it can also refer to a government council chamber (related to the divan), as well as in a more specific sense in Mughal architecture. They tend to occur in pairs in the Mughal imperial capitals; the most famous ones are in Agra Fort, but there are others in Red Fort, Delhi and Fatehpur Sikri and certain other princely capitals such as Amber and also in Lahore Fort Pakistan.

== Diwan-i-Am ==
A Diwan-i-Am (Persian: ديوان عام) was a court's Hall of Public Audience, where the ruler held a mass audience. He would sit on his throne facing petitioners. His minister would assemble the petitions and refer them to the Diwan-i-Khas for private audience. It was made by Shah Jahan.

== Diwan-i-Khas ==
A Diwan-i-Khas (Persian: ديوان خاص) was a court's Hall of Private Audience, smaller than the Diwan-i-Am. Here envoys and other honoured guests were granted a personal audience with the ruler. At Agra, the Diwan-i-Khas is a small marble structure near the Diwan-i-Am. It is inside a red fort. It was the most ornamental building built by Shahjhan. It was decorated by gems and gold silver linings. A channel built by marble in which water flows justifies its exceptional beauty. On one of its walls this verse in Persian language is written:

If there is paradise anywhere on earth it is here, it is here, it is here
