= Zain Khan Koka =

Moghul Empire official

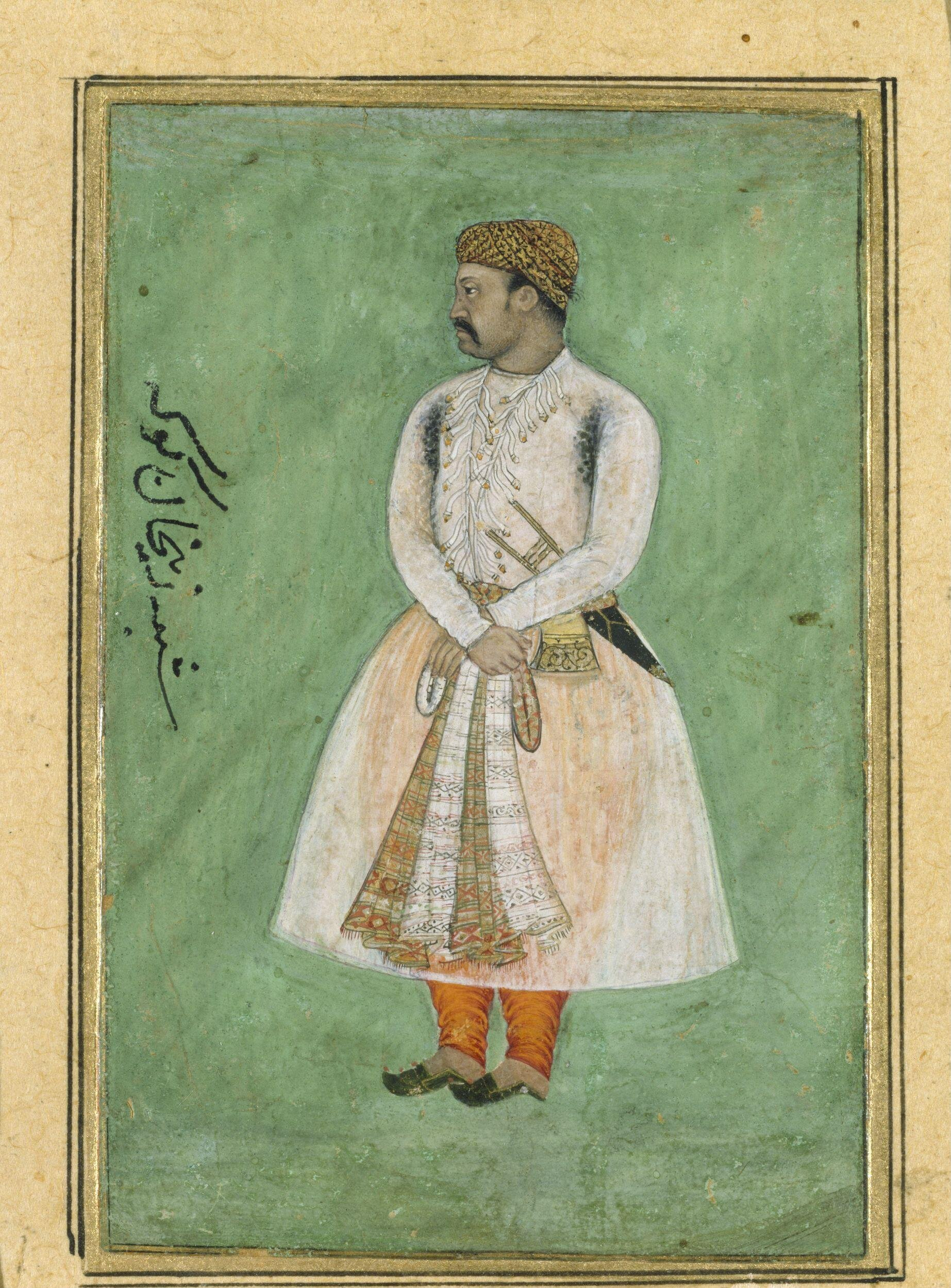
- Late 16th century painting of Zain Khan Koka

Subahdar of Kabul
- In office 1596–1601

Personal details
- Died: 1601
- Children: Khas Mahal; Mughal Khan

Military service
- Allegiance: Mughal Empire
- Branch/service: Mughal Army
- Years of service: 1585–1601
- Battles/wars: See list: Mughal–Pashtun Wars; Battle of the Malandari Pass

Zain Khan Koka (died 1601) was a leading official in the Mughal Empire under Akbar, including serving for a time as governor of Kabul.

Zain Khan was the son of Akbar's wetnurse and thus received the title "Koka" which means foster brother. He was of Iranian heritage. Zain Khan was a musician, besides being a failed military leader. In 1585, he was made one of the leaders of the Mughal forces fighting to bring the Yusufzai tribe under Mughal control. But his subsequent failure at the Battle of the Malandari Pass due to undermining the strength of Yusufzai, refusal to agree with Birbal and other commanders in that battle and his run from the battle field to save his life, somewhat earned him a reputation of being an incompetent military leader. Still, in 1596, he was made governor of Kabul, likely due to him being Akbar's Foster brother.

== Daughter's marriage with Jahangir ==
In 1596 Prince Salim (future Emperor Jahangir) became violently enamoured of Zain Khan Koka's daughter Khas Mahal, and meditated marrying her. Akbar was displeased at the impropriety. The cause of Akbar's objection was Sahib Jamal who had already been married to Salim. Akbar objected to marriages between near relations. However, when Akbar saw that Salim's heart was immoderately affected, he, of necessity, gave his consent. There was a great feast and joy. The marriage took place on the eve of 28 June 1596 at the house of Hamida Banu Begum.

== Family ==
Besides Khas Mahal, Zain Khan Koka had at least two sons. Zain Khan's son, Mughal Khan, served as the governor of fort Udgir in Bidar. Another of his sons, Zafar Khan served as the governor of Bihar.

== Sources ==
- John F. Richards, The New Cambridge History of India: The Mughal Empire (New York: Cambridge University Press, 19930 p. 50.
- description connected with painting of Zain Khan
