= Shah Jahani Mahal =

- Shah Jahani Mahal in Agra Fort

- Location within Uttar Pradesh Location within India
- 27°10′44″N 78°01′23″E
- Location: Agra Fort, Agra, Uttar Pradesh, India

The Shah Jahan Mahal is palace in the Agra Fort in northern India.

== History ==
Palace is situated between the white marble Khas Mahal and the red stone Jahangiri Mahal and is set, transitionally, in between these two major residential complexes of two different ages. It is the earliest attempt of the Mughal emperor Shah Jahan to convert an existing redstone building in accordance with his taste. It is his earliest palace in Agra Fort and has a large hall and side rooms, and an octagonal tower on the river side.

The skeletal construction of the brick masonry and red stone were all white, stuccoed with a thick plaster and colourfully painted with floral designs. The whole palace once glistened white, like white marble.

On its face towards the Khas Mahal is a white marble dalan, composed of five nine-cusped arches supported on double pillars and protected externally by a Chhajja. Its western bay was closed to house the Ghaznin gate. Babur's baoli and well are situated beneath it. The subterranean apartments in several stories are also situated under this palace.
