= Akbari Mahal =

Residence of imperial consorts at the Agra Fort

Coordinates: 27.1770°N 78.0233°E

The Akbari Mahal is a palace located in the zenana (harem quarters) of the Agra Fort. It served as a residence for ladies of the imperial harem and was used as a place for the emperor to rest at.

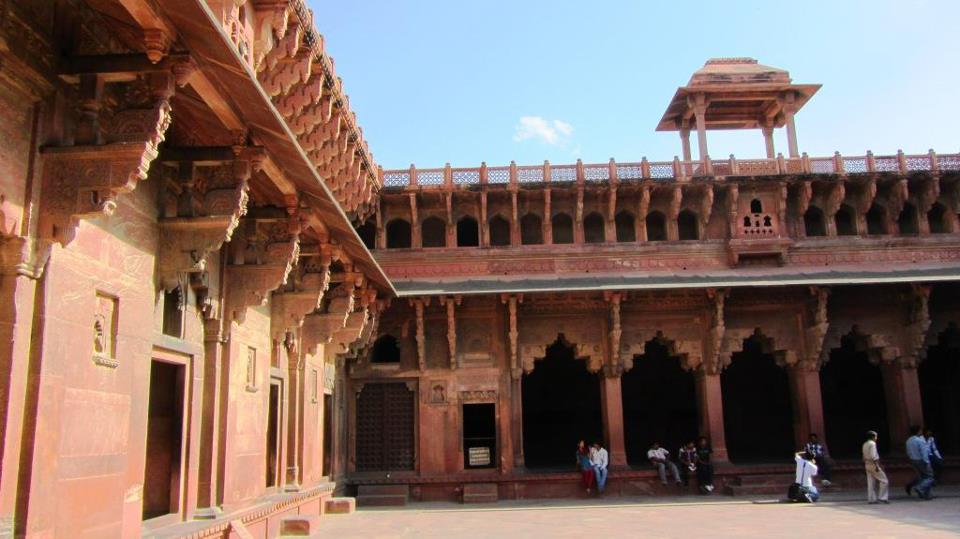
Courtyard of the Akbari Mahal

== History ==
Built around 1565, the Akbari Mahal lies in the southeastern part of the harem and served as one of the palaces for the imperial consorts. Situated between the Jahangiri Mahal, Bengali Burj, and the Khas Mahal, It has a large stone-paved courtyard enclosed on all sides with various chambers and suites. It contains one entrance through the gateway on the western side, designed so that it ensured purdah for the ladies in the harem. The large assembly hall with a high ceiling on the lower storey served as a meeting area for the women and the emperor. Near the Bengali Burj on its opposite side is the Akbari Baoli (well).

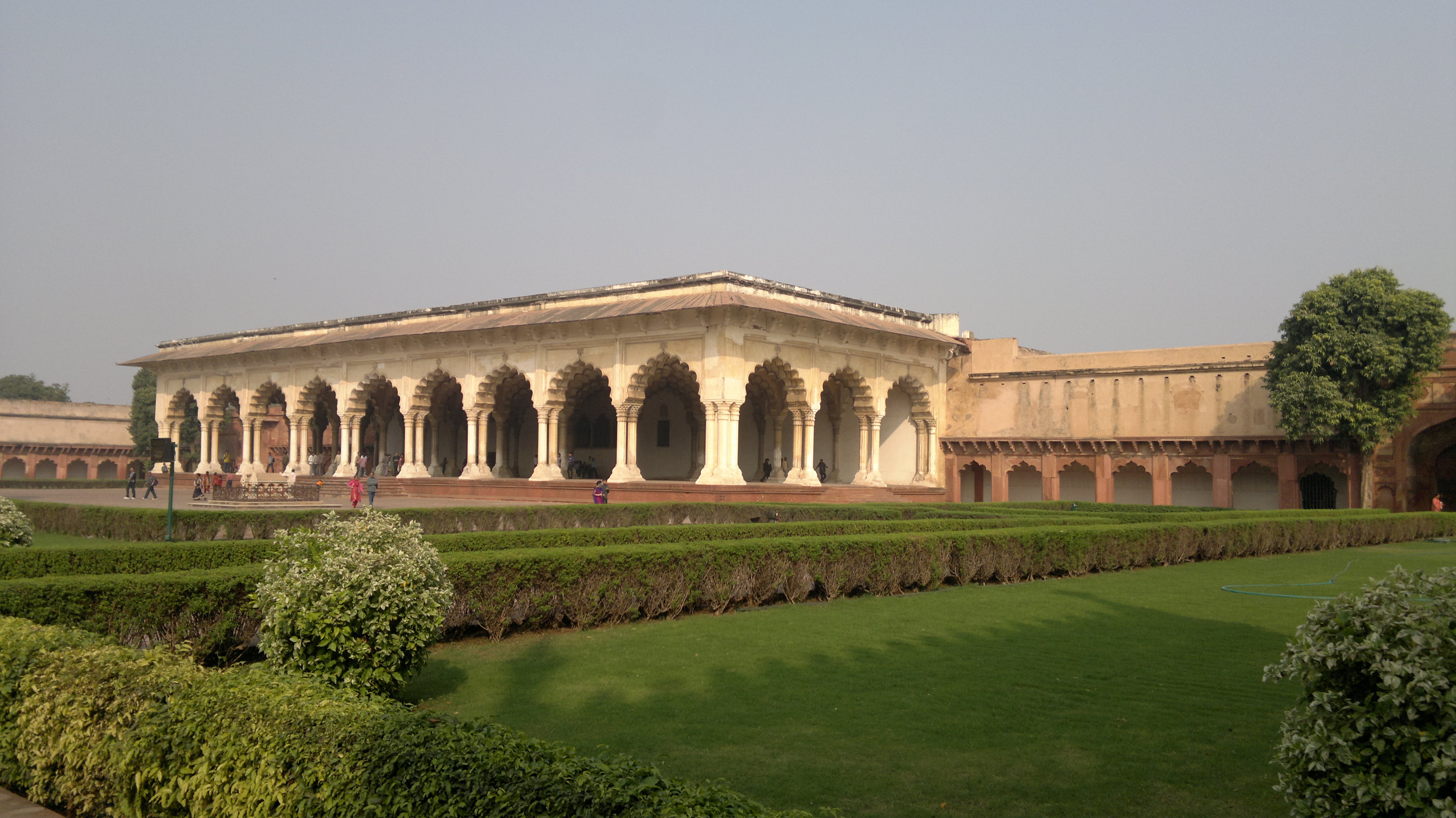
The large pavillion built with marble

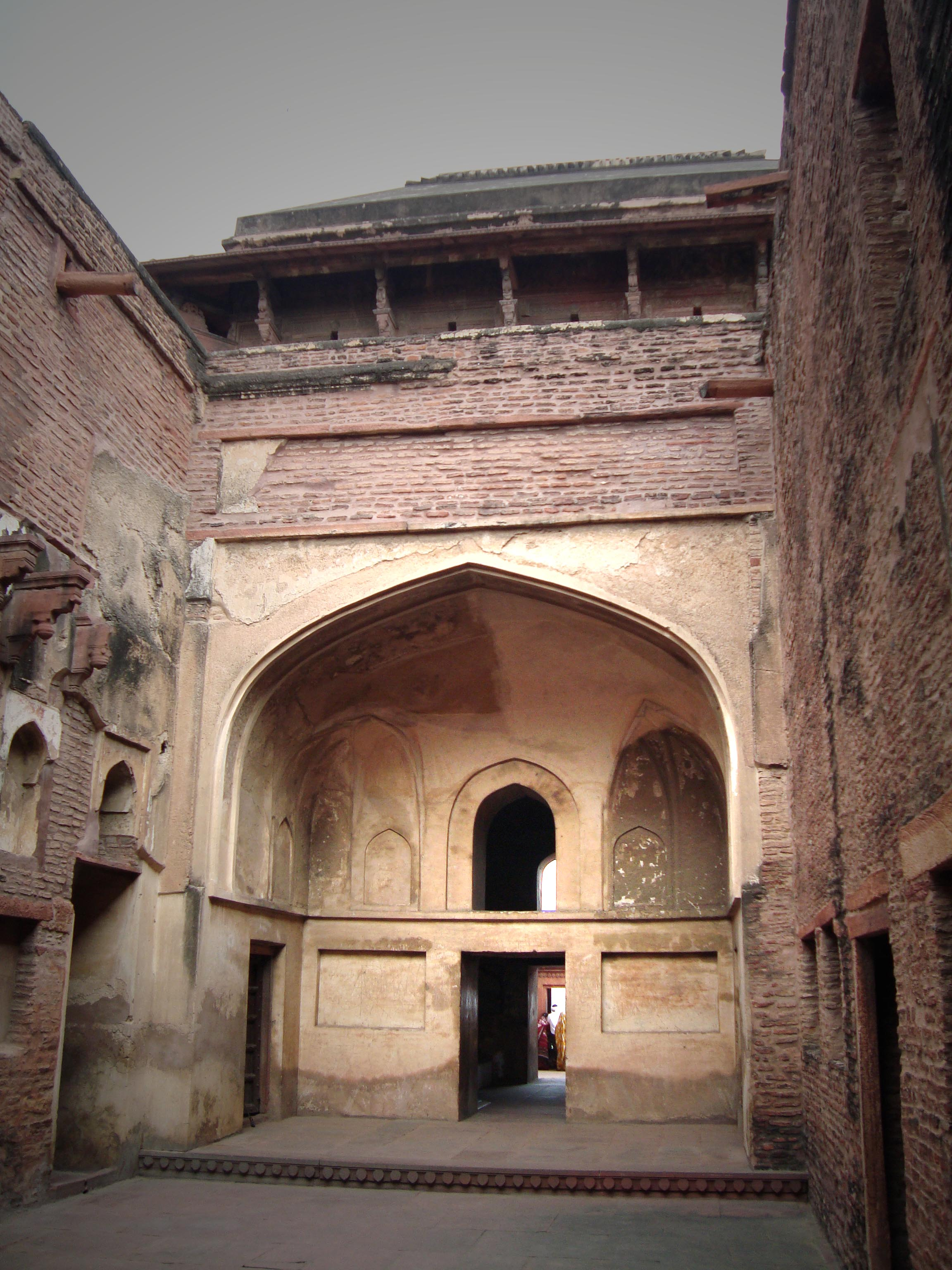
A chamber in the Akbari Mahal

== See also ==
- Jahangiri Mahal
- Jodha Bai Mahal
