= Karunaratne Amarasinghe =

Sri Lankan state media personnel

- Born: Kalubowila, Sri Lanka
- Education: Buddhagosha Maha Vidyalaya Kalubowila, St. John's College
- Occupation: Broadcaster
- Employer: Sri Lanka Broadcasting Corporation
- Known for: Author

Karunaratne Amarasinghe is one of the distinguished media personnel in Sri Lanka who was awarded by the Presidential Media Award in 2018. He is also known as a senior announcers of SLBC and an Author. Amarasinghe was born at Kalubowila and educated at Buddhagosha Maha Vidyalaya Kalubowila and St. John's College, Nugegoda.
