= Mahendra Amerasinghe =

Sri Lankan cricketer

Mahendra Amerasinghe was a Sri Lankan cricketer. He was a right-handed batsman and right-arm medium-pace bowler who played for Moors Sports Club.

Amerasinghe made a single first-class appearance for the side, during the 1995–96 season, against Sebastianites Cricket and Athletic Club. From the tailend, he scored 19 runs in the only innings in which he batted.
