= Amarsinh =

Amarsinh is an Indian male given name. Notable people with the name include:

- Amarsinh Chaudhary (1941–2004), Indian politician
- Tushar Amarsinh Chaudhary (born 1965), Indian politician, son of Amarsinh
- Amarsinh Pandit (born 1964), Indian politician
