= Amar Singh (humanitarian) =

Australian charity founder

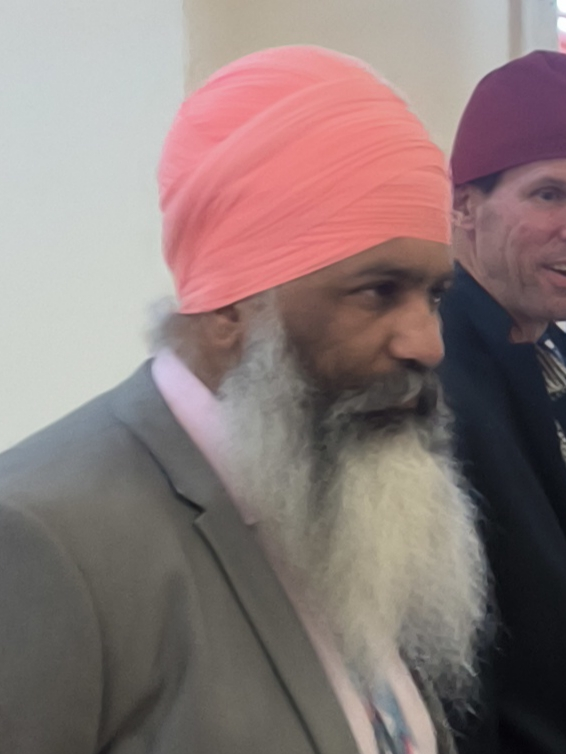
Amar Singh in 2024

Amar Singh (born 1983) is the founder and president of Turbans 4 Australia, a non-profit which provides food hampers and disaster related charity in Australia

He was the recipient of the 2023 Local Hero of Australia award.

== Life ==
Singh immigrated from India in 1998 when he was 15 years old. He experienced racism at an early age which left him determined to educate others about Sikhs and what it means to be Australian.

== Achievements ==
Amar Singh started Turbans 4 Australia in 2015 after experiencing racism whilst driving. He started with the goal to provide assistance for all Australians, and to educate about the Sikh community. He was awarded the 2023 Local Hero of Australia award

Amar Singh drove around Australia in 2023 in support of the 'Yes' vote for the 2023 Australian Indigenous Voice referendum.
