= Jahangiri Mahal =

Residence of imperial consorts at the Agra Fort

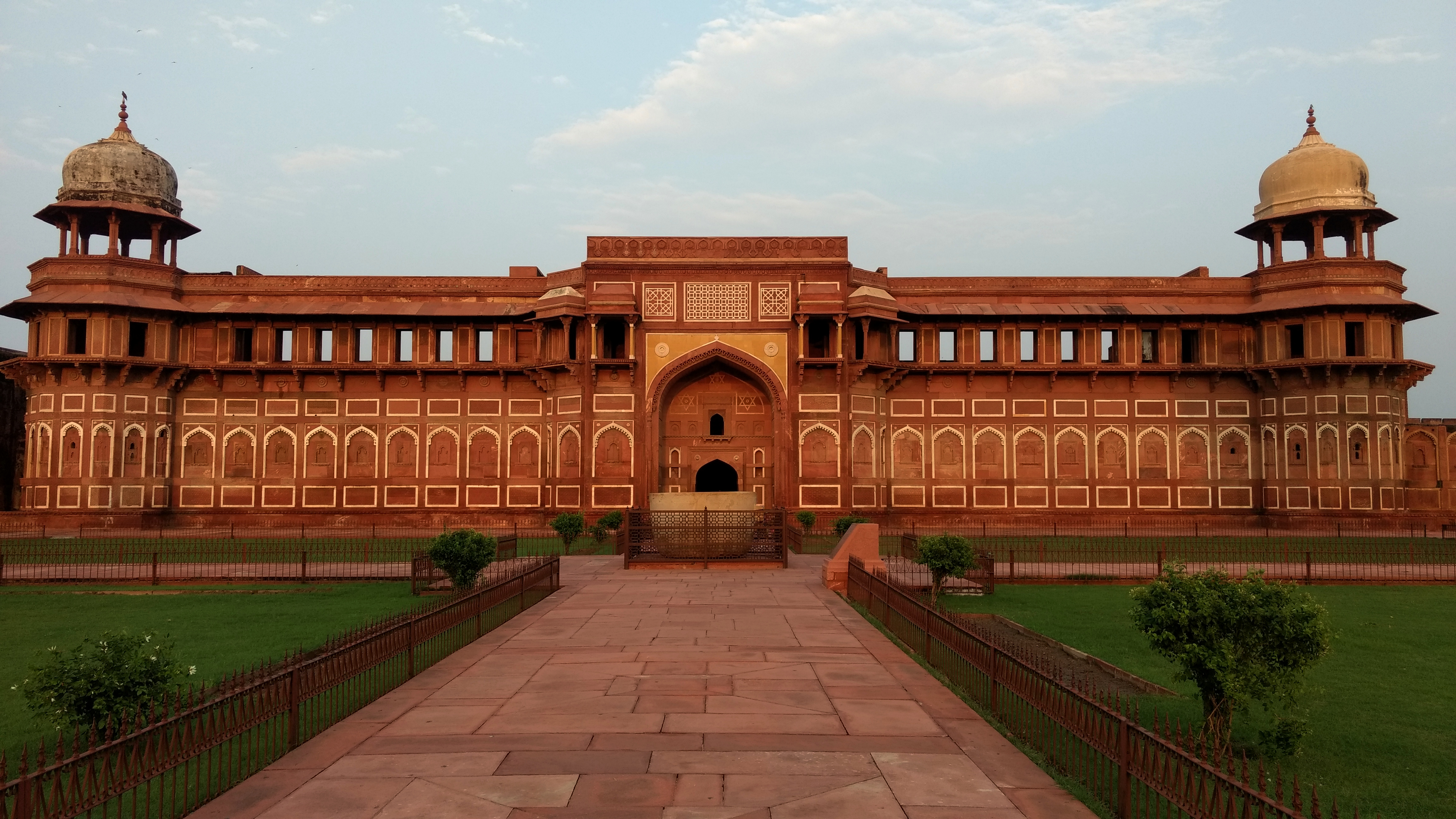
Agra Fort: Jahangiri Mahal

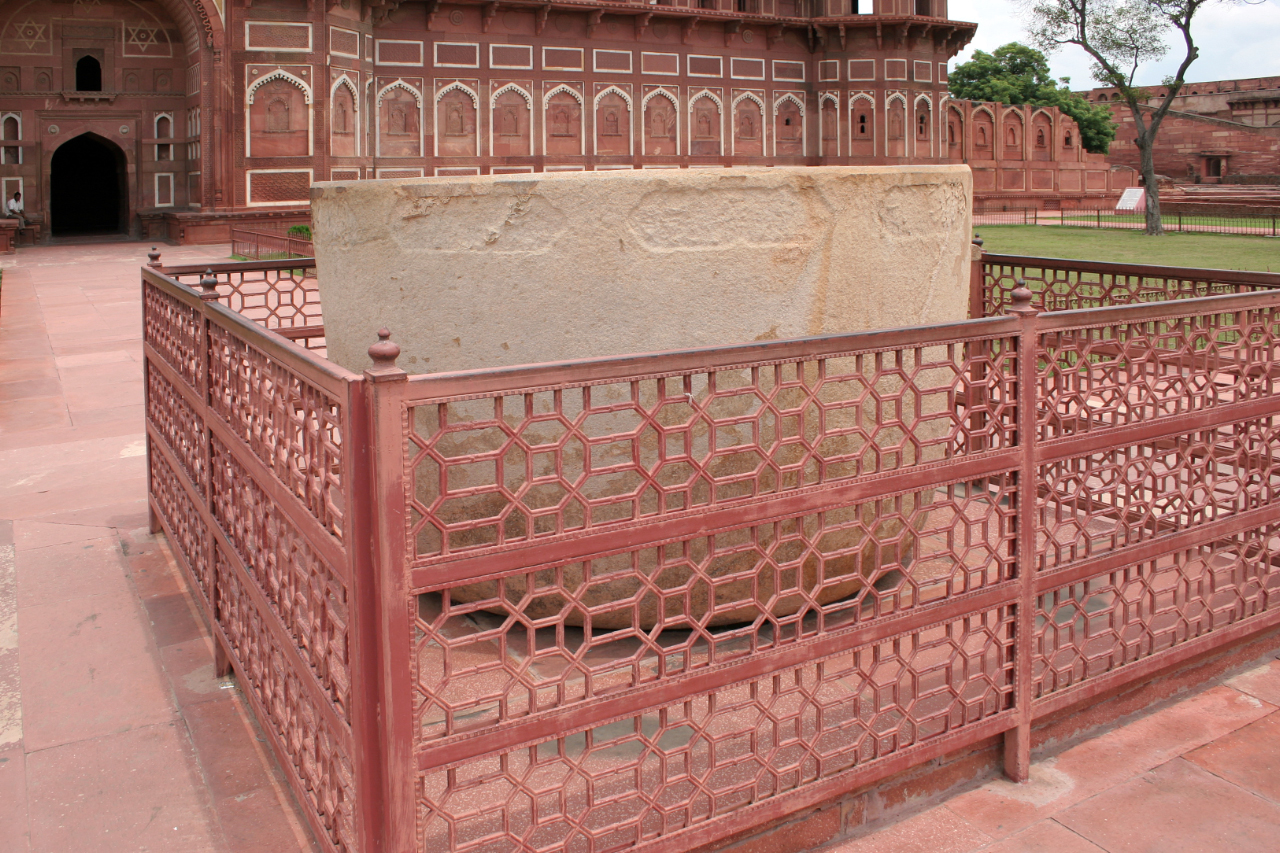
The Hauz-i-Jahangiri is made out of one single block of stone

Jahangiri Mahal is a palace inside the Agra Fort of India. The Mahal was the principal zenana (palace for women belonging to the royal household), and was constructed for the chief wife, Mariam-uz-Zamani or few other Hindu wives of Akbar. It is a form of Islamic architecture.

== History ==
The palace was built by Akbar for his Hindu wives. It is one of the earliest surviving buildings of Akbar's reign. It is believed to have been house of Akbar’s chief Hindu queen, Mariam-uz-Zamani popularly known as ‘Jodha Bai’. Jahangir in his memoirs stated that the buildings were erected by his father Akbar but did not take any credit for the construction of Jahangiri palace or Mahal. During the reign of Jahangir, it is believed to be the residence of his wife, Jagat Gosain, the Princess of Marwar and mother of Mughal emperor Shah Jahan.

There is a huge bowl called Hauz-i-Jahangiri that is carved out of a single piece of stone. This was used as a container for fragrant rose water.

== See also ==
- Akbari Mahal
- Khas Mahal (Agra Fort)
- Moti Masjid, Agra
- Jodha Bai Mahal
- Shah Jahani Mahal
