= Felix Amerasinghe =

Sri Lankan entomologist

Felix Prashantha Amerasinghe (14 July 1948 – 7 June 2005) was a Sri Lankan entomologist who studied arthropods of medical importance including ticks and mosquitoes and their role in the spread of diseases such as malaria, dengue, Japanese encephalitis, and lyme.

Amerasinghe was born to Cuthbert and Effie Amerasinghe. Cuthbert was a professor of Western Classics at the University of Ceylon. He studied at St Anthony's College, Katugastota and then at the University of Peradeniya from where he graduated in zoology in 1971. He received a commonwealth scholarship and continued studies at the University of Bristol, working on Schistocerca gregaria under L. Strong, and received a Ph.D. in 1977. He returned to Sri Lanka and continued working as a lecturer, professor (1996) and head of the department of zoology (1998). His major contribution was on the study of Japanese encephalitis in Sri Lanka. His Priyanie was also a researcher and they worked together in the University of Maryland between 1990 and 1992, studying and monitor ticks involved in the transmission of lyme disease. From 2000 he worked at the International Water Management Institute.
