= Khas Mahal (Agra Fort) =

Residence of the ladies of the harem at Agra Fort

The Khas Mahal (also known as the Aramgah-I-Muqaddas) is a palace in the Agra Fort. The complex contained the apartments of the women of the harem.

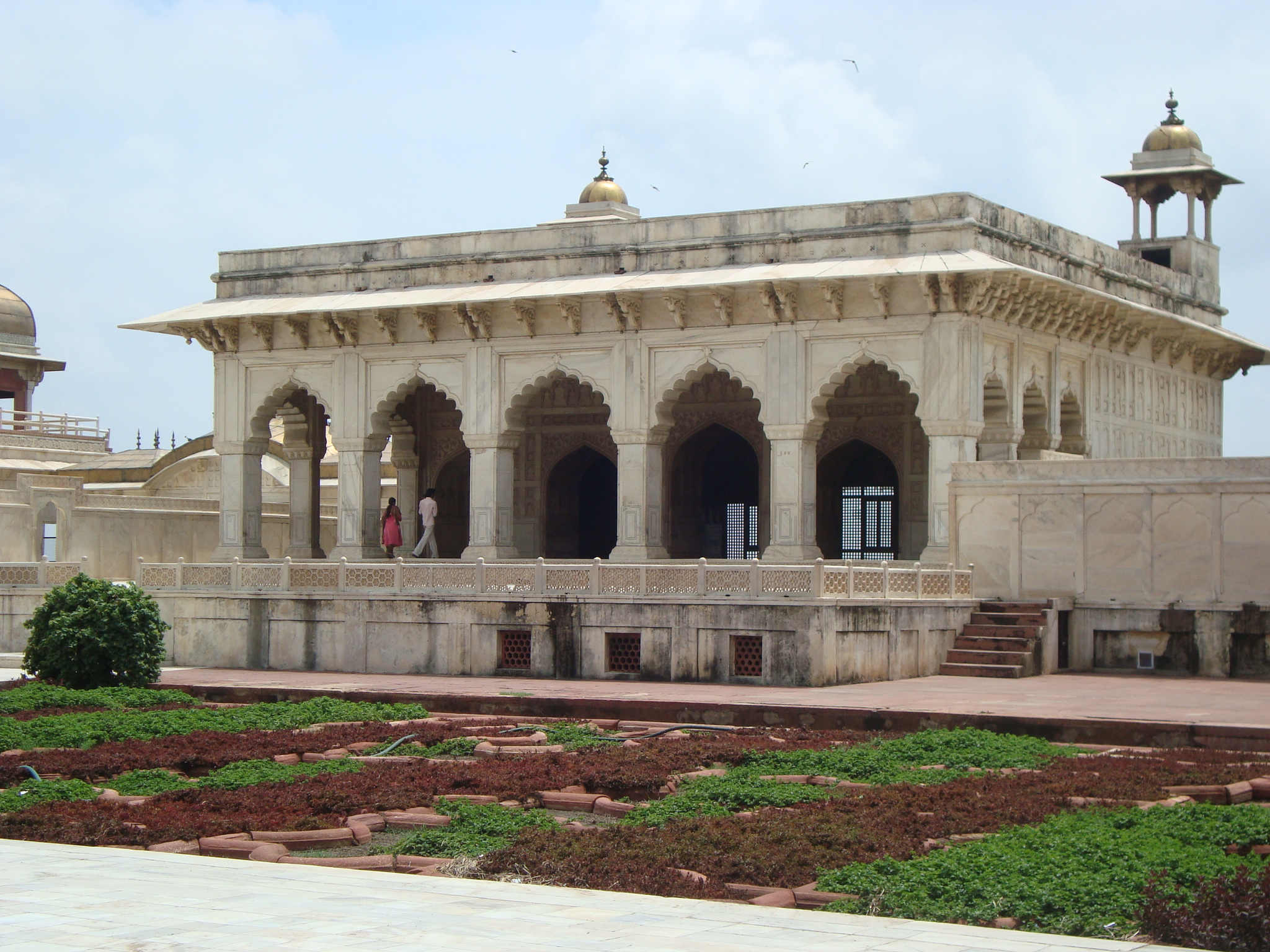
The front view of the Khas Mahal.

== History ==
It was built by Emperor Shah Jahan around 1631 and was the residence of the princesses Jahanara Begum and Roshanara Begum. It is believed that Jahanara lived in the northern palace of the two.

== Architecture ==
The Khas Mahal comprises open terraces and a hall flanked by pavilions on both sides serving as partitions. It stands on an elevated platform paved with pristine marble. The palace includes elegant fountains, tanks, and a waterfall surrounded by chambers with courts and verandahs.

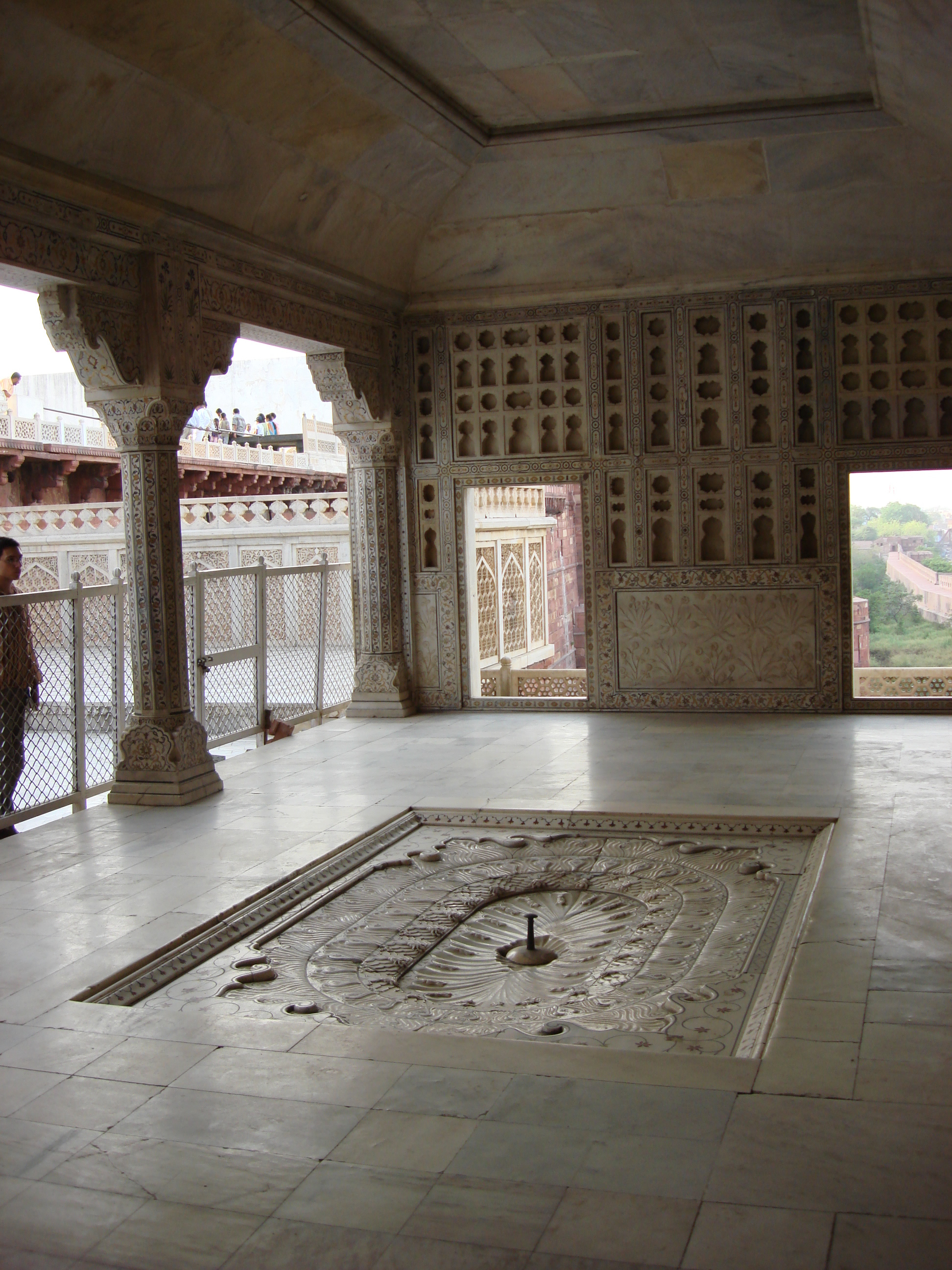
Interior chambers inside the Khas Mahal with a fountain.

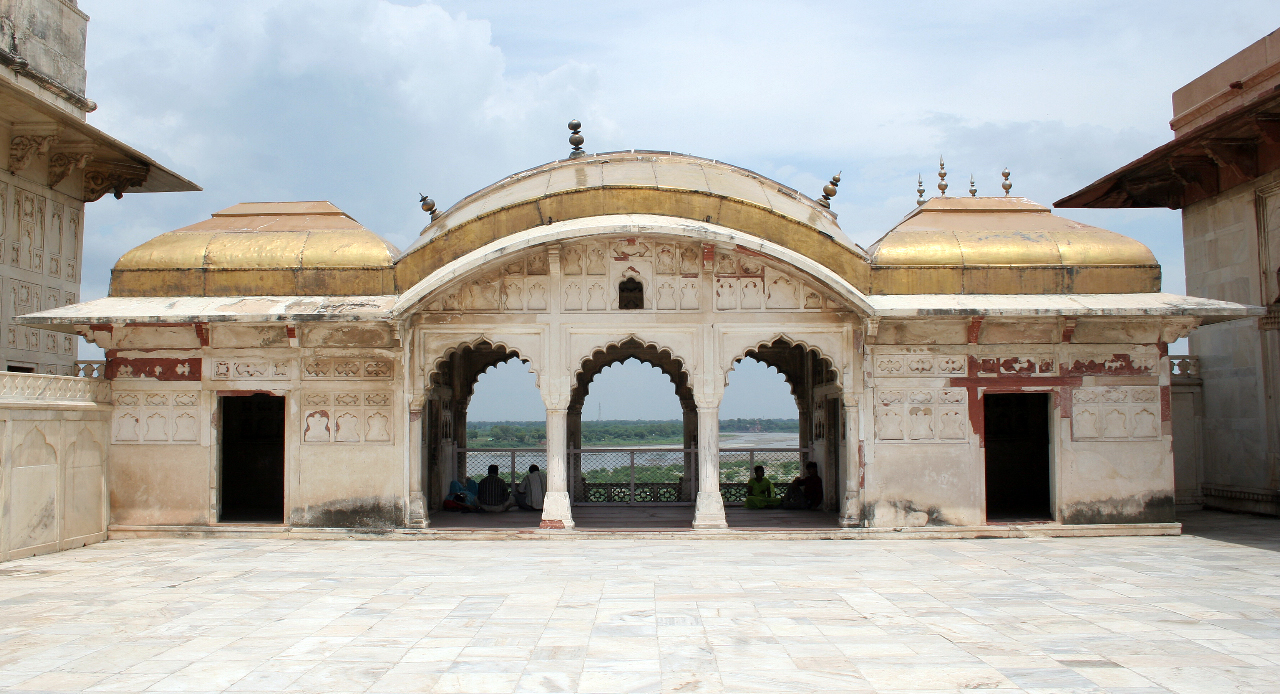
Princess Jahanara Begum's pavilion.

The interior of the palace contains beautifully adorned ceilings and alcoves in the walls around, with iron rings hung up high where lanterns once hung. The walls are decorated with intricate golden frescoes. In front of the Khas Mahal complex is the Anguri Bagh, a grape garden built in 1637. The charbagh (four part) Anguri Bagh served as a pleasure garden for the ladies of the harem to relax at. There used to be hammams at its northeast.

== The Harem apartments and Anguri Bagh ==
The Anguri Bagh contains water channels and pathways dividing it into four sides, and In its centre used to be a marble paved fountain. The garden was known for having the choicest grapes and beautiful flowers throughout the year, hence the name. The tanks near the Jahangiri Mahal ensured that there was sufficient water supply for its water channels and ponds. Surrounding the garden are the harem apartments, which are directly adjacent to the garden.

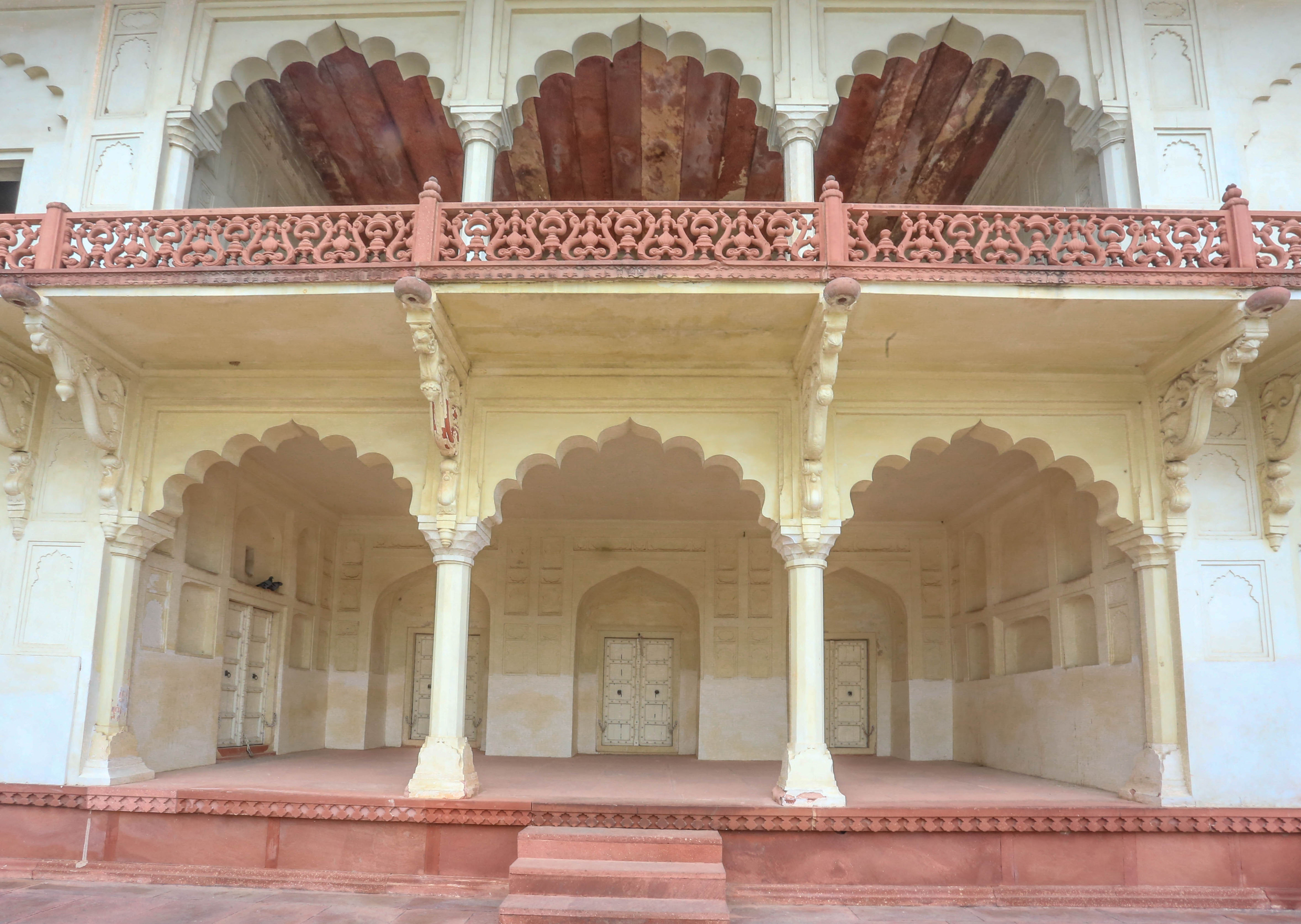
The Harem apartments.

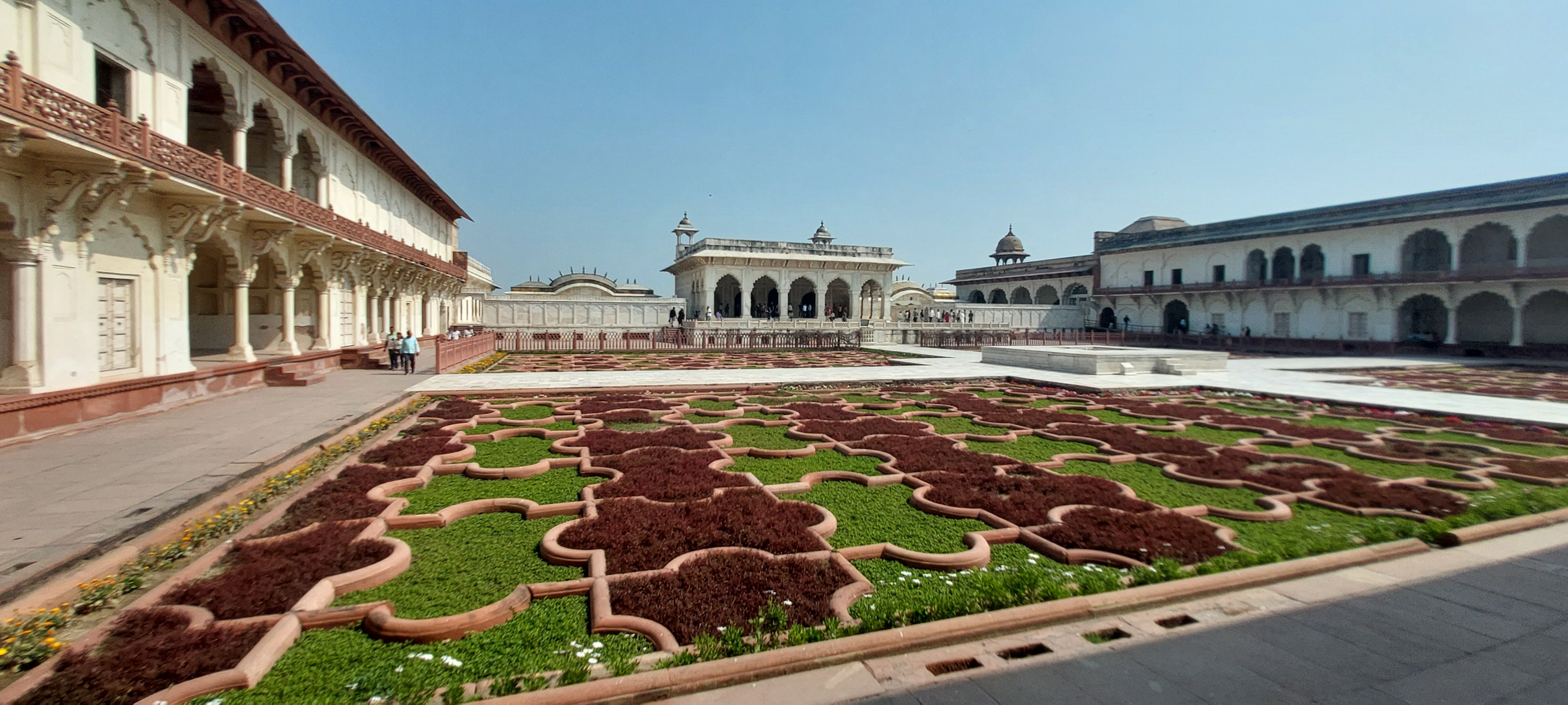
The Anguri Bagh or Grape Garden.

The apartments are two storeyed, with open pillared verandahs on their exterior.

== See also ==
- Jahangiri Mahal
- Akbari Mahal
- Musamman Burj

== Gallery ==
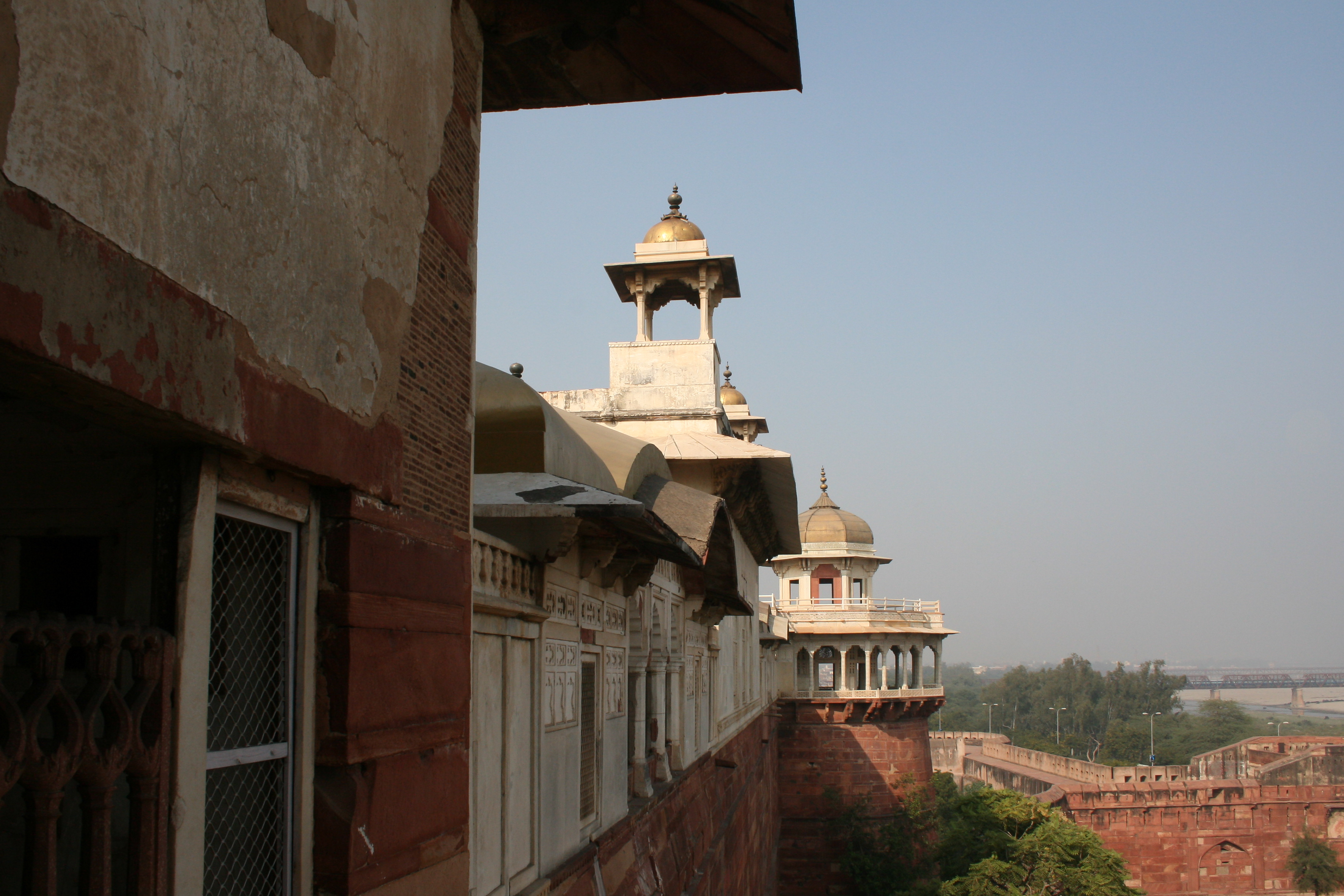
Rear aide view of the Khas Mahal and Musamman Burj.

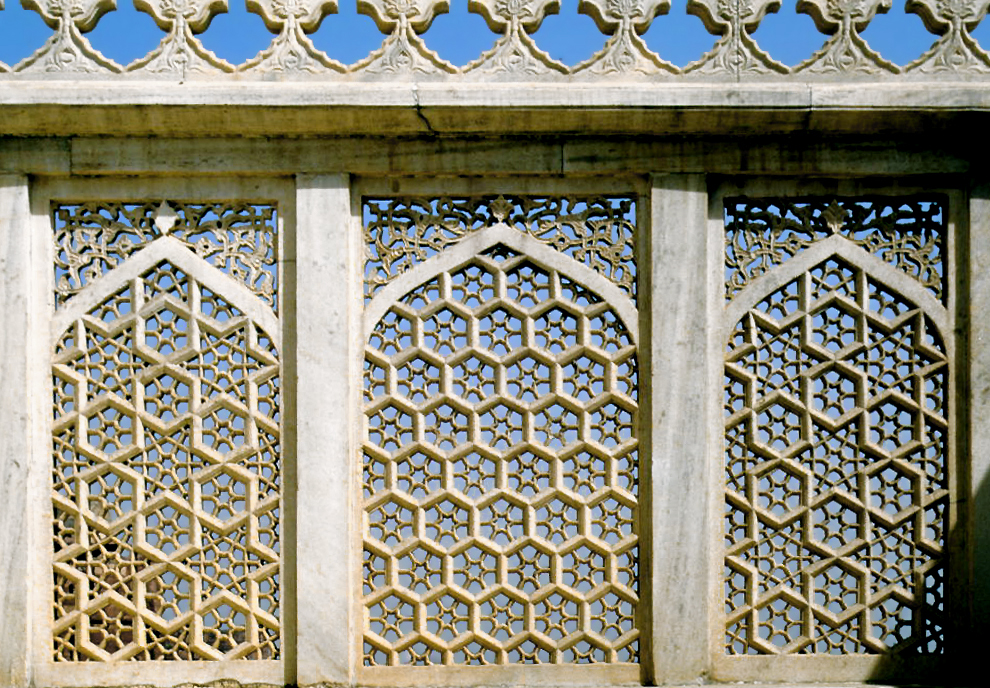
Marble carved Jali screens.

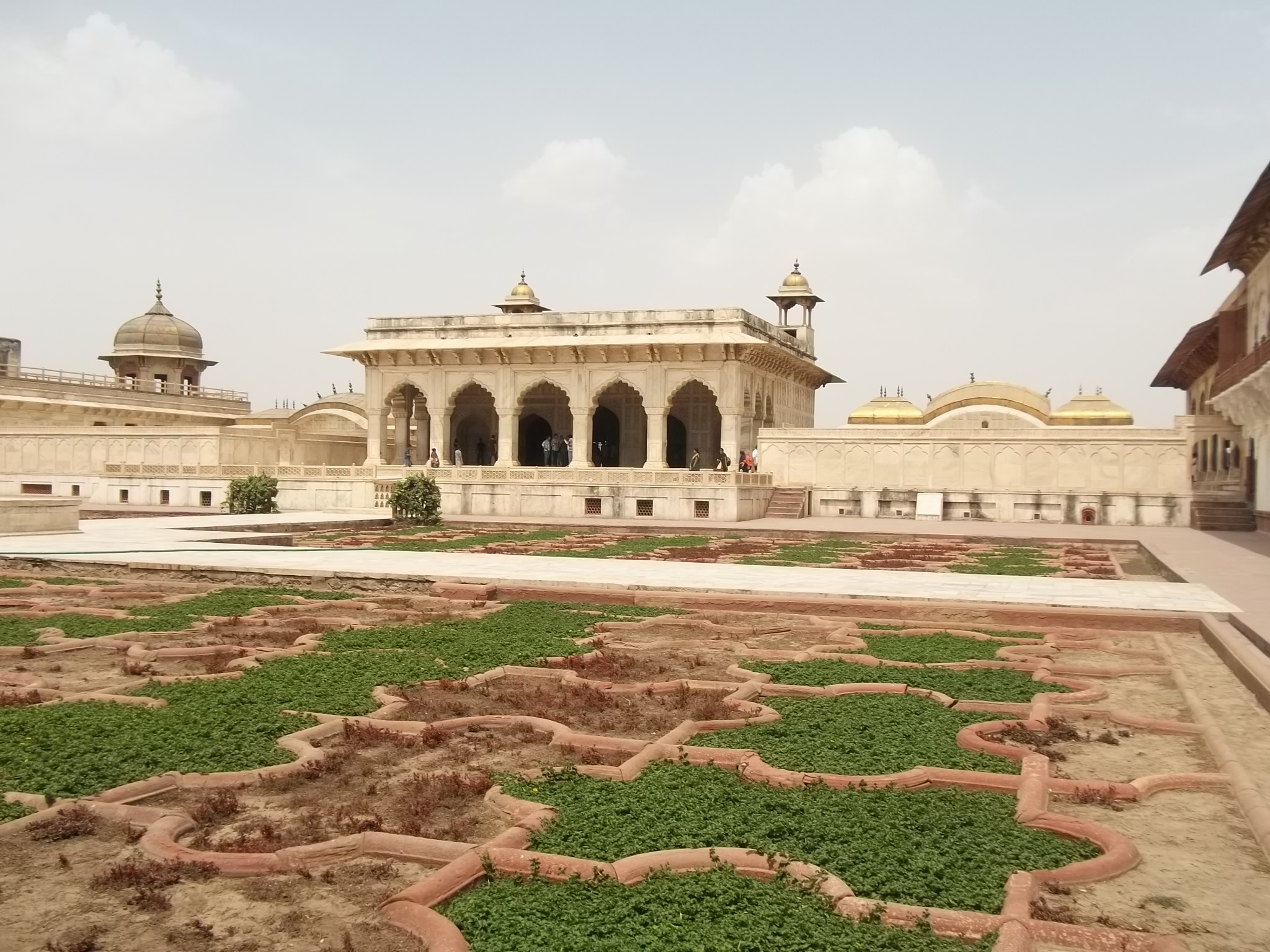
The place overlooking the garden.

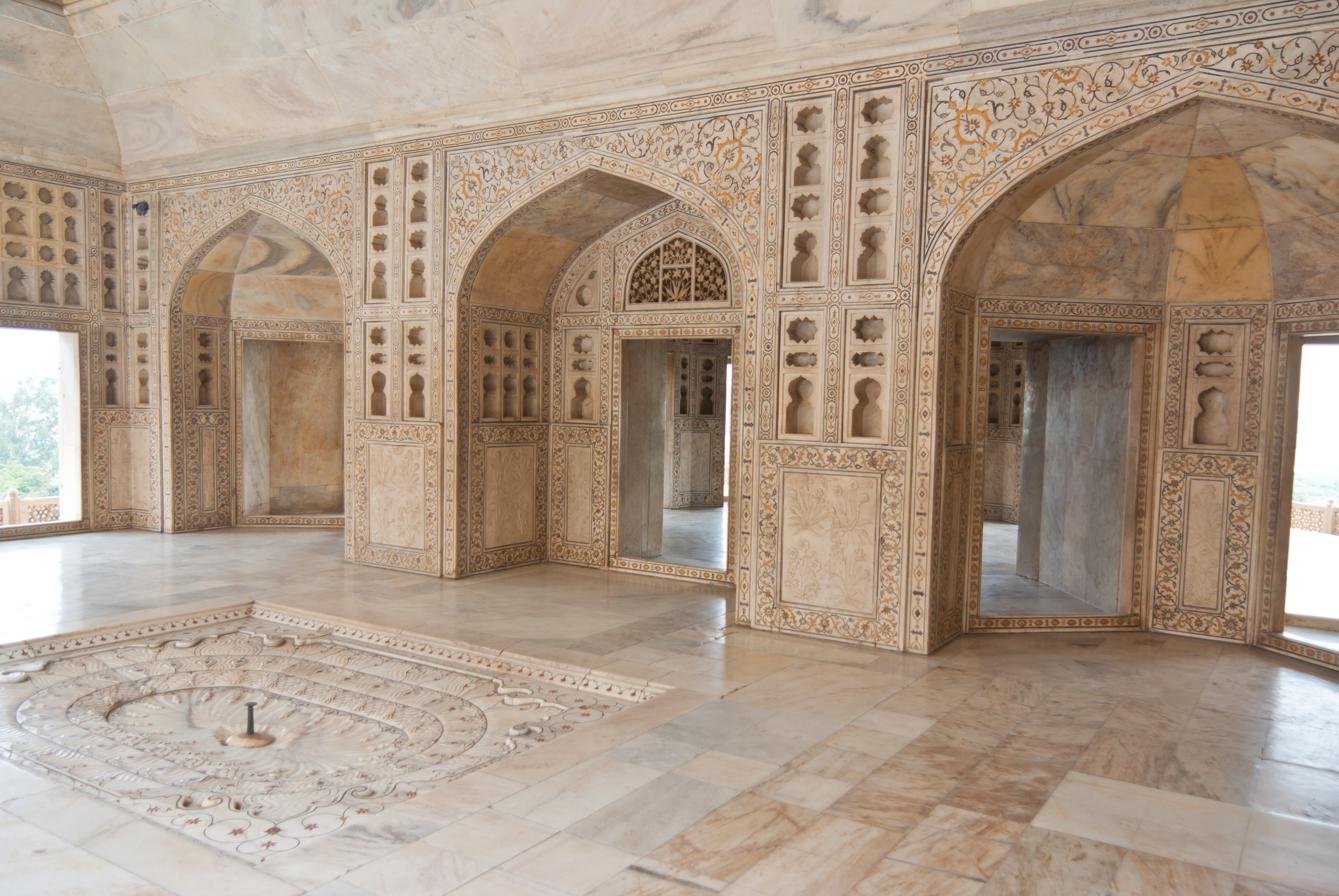
Chambers inside the Khas Mahal.

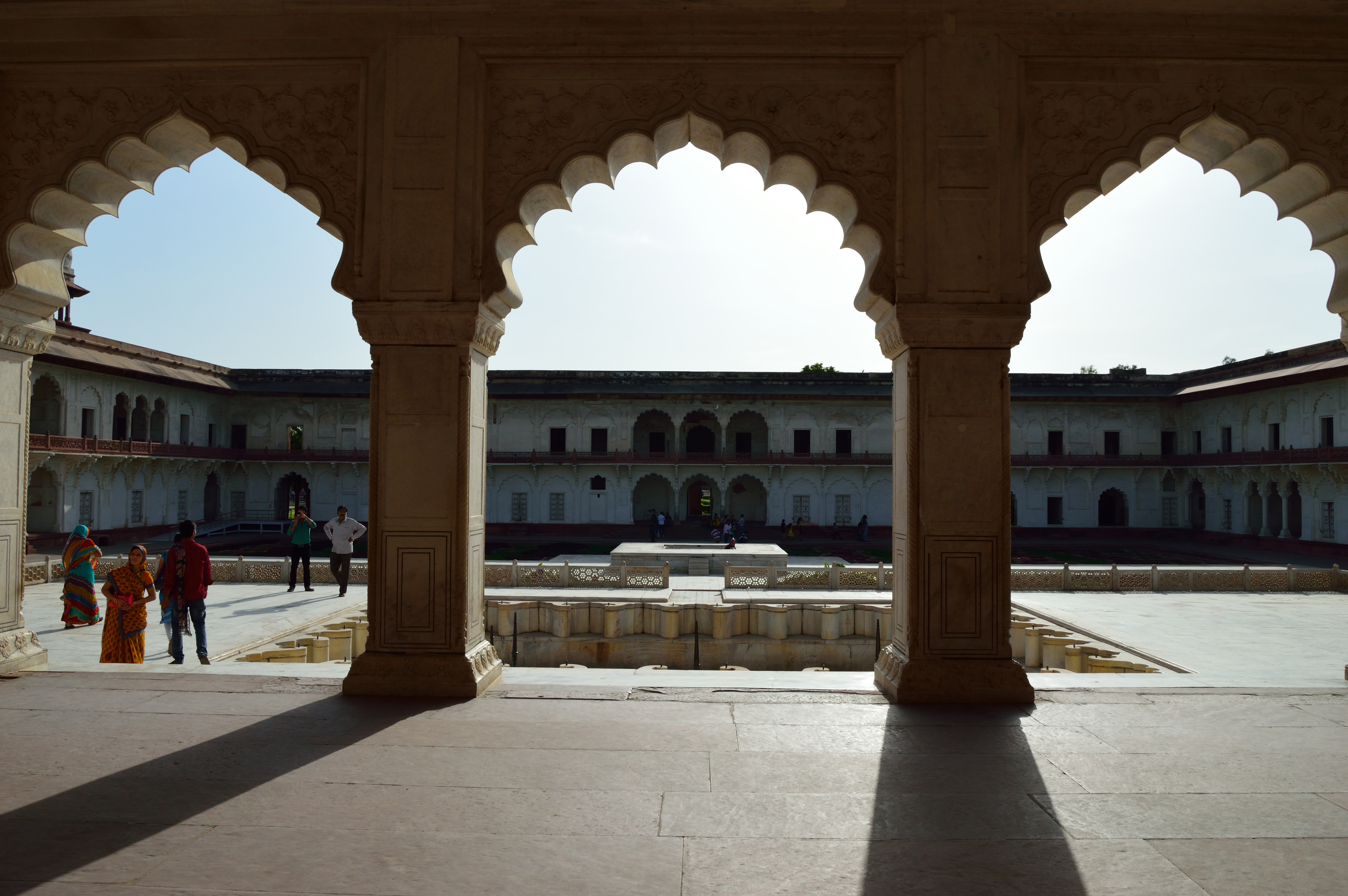
The Khas Mahal complex and the harem apartments.

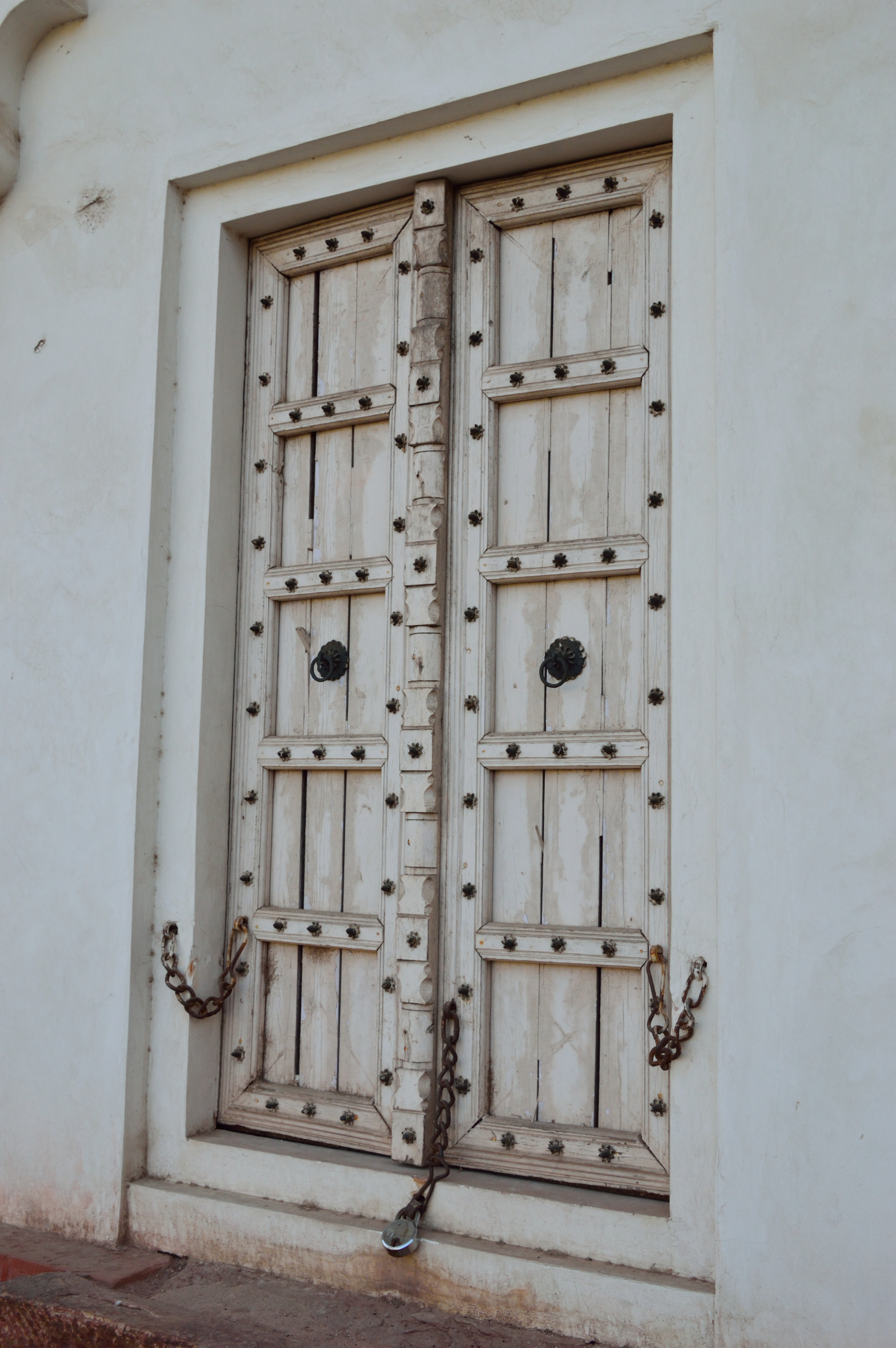
A harem door.

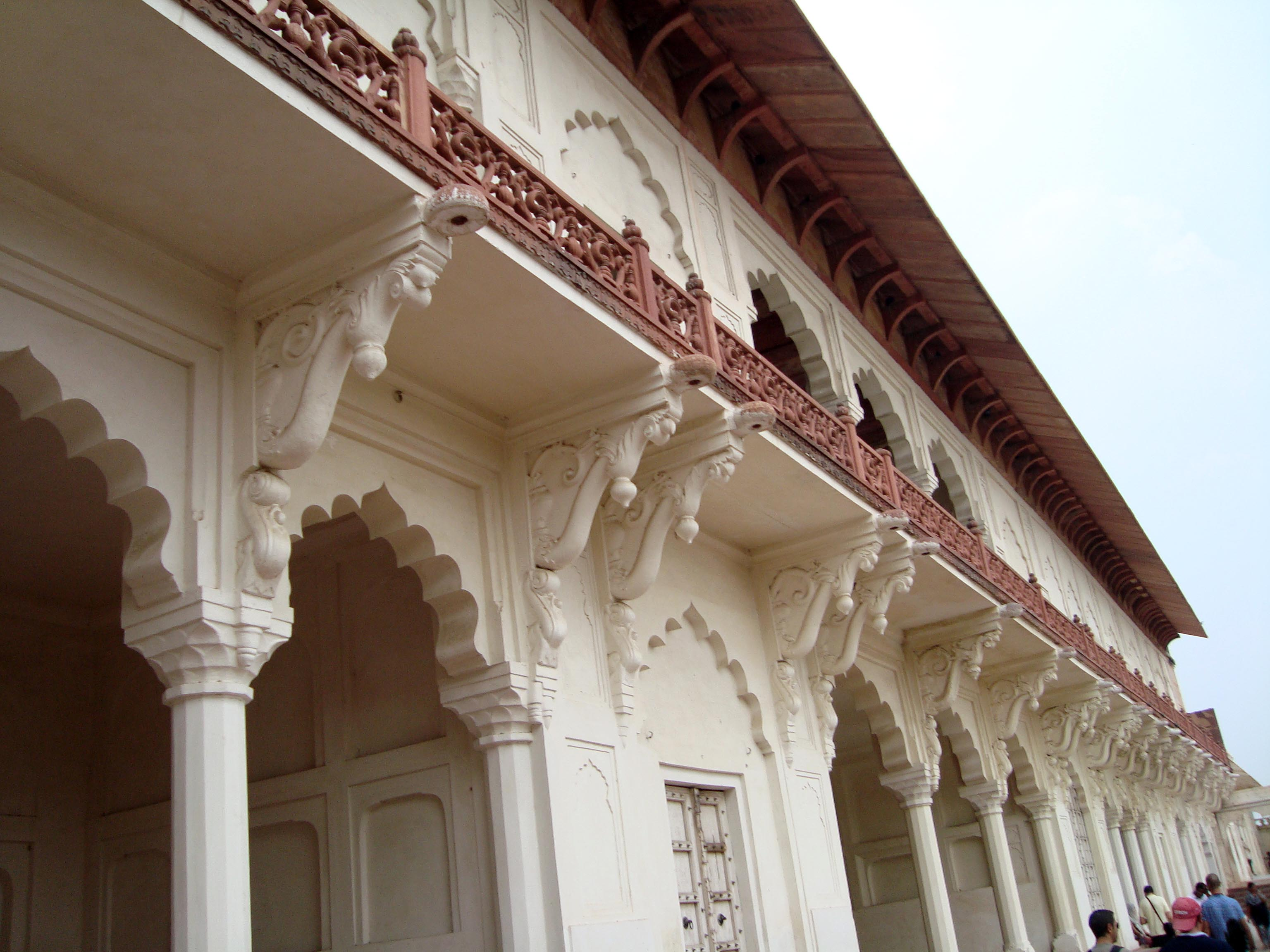
The terraces of the compartments.

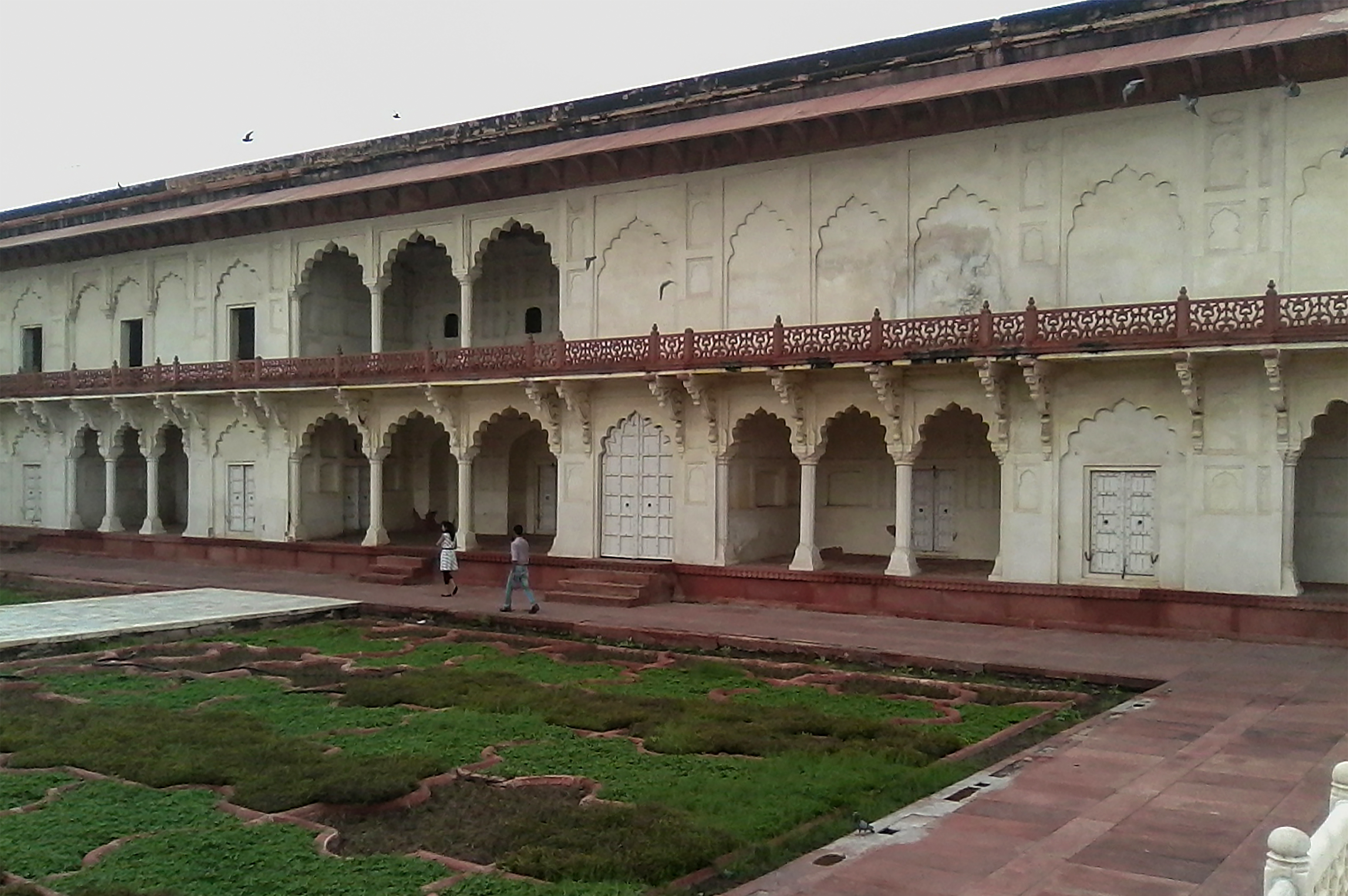
The harem apartments overlooking the Anguri Bagh.
