= Khas Mahal =

Chief Wife of Mughal Emperor Jahangir

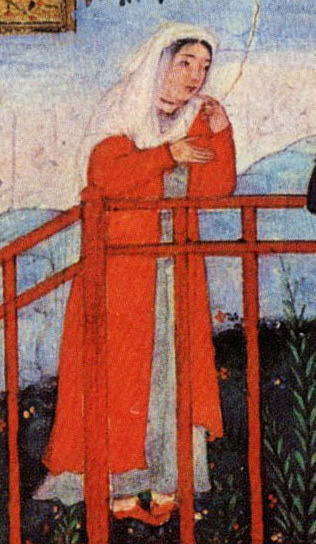
- Detail of Khas Mahal from a painting
- Spouse: Jahangir (m. 1596; d. 1627)
- House: Timurid (by marriage)
- Father: Zain Khan Koka
- Religion: Islam

Khas Mahal (Persian: خاص محل), meaning "the Exquisite One of the Palace", was one of the chief wives and empress of the Mughal emperor Jahangir.

== Family ==
Khas Mahal was the daughter of Zain Khan Koka. Zain Khan was the son of Khawajah Maqsud of Herat and Pija Jan Anga, the wet nurse of Emperor Akbar. Zain Khan's paternal uncle, Khawajah Hassan's daughter, Sahib Jamal was married to Jahangir, and was the mother of his son, Prince Parviz Mirza.

Khas Mahal had two brothers, named Zafar Khan and Mughal Khan. The former served under Akbar and Jahangir, and died on 7 March 1622. The latter served under Jahangir and his son Shah Jahan, and died on 1 July 1657. A sister of Khas Mahal was married to Mirza Anwar, a son of Mirza Aziz Koka, Akbar's foster brother.

== Marriage ==
In 1596 Prince Salim (future Emperor Jahangir) became violently enamored of her and meditated on marrying her. Akbar was displeased at the impropriety. The cause of Akbar's objection was Sahib Jamal who had already been married to Salim. Akbar objected to marriages between near relations.

However, when Akbar saw that Salim's heart was immoderately affected, he, of necessity, gave his consent. There was a great feast and joy. The marriage took place on the eve of 18 June 1596 at the house of Dowager empress Hamida Banu Begum.

When Jahangir ascended the throne, Khas Mahal became empress. Sir William Hawkins, a representative of the English East India Company noted her among Jahangir's chief wives. He said the following:

Hee (Jahangir) hath .... three hundred wives whereof four be chiefe as queenes, to say, the first, named Padasha Banu (Saliha Banu Begum), daughter to Kaime Chan (Qaim Khan); the second is called Noore Mahal (Nur Jahan), the daughter of Gais Beyge (Mirza Ghiyas Beg); the third is the daughter of Seinchan (Zain Khan); the fourth is the daughter of Hakim Humaun (Mirza Muhammad Hakim), who was brother to his father Ekber Padasha (Akbar)

== Architecture ==
In 1642–43, Khas Mahal commissioned a palace near the old fort in the neighborhood of Nizamuddin, Delhi.

== In popular culture ==
Khas Mahal is a character in Jyoti Jafa's historical novel Nur Jahan: A Historical Novel (1978).
