= Agra Fort =

Historical Mughal fort in India

- Agra Fort
- Interactive map of Agra Fort
- Location: Agra, Uttar Pradesh, India

Site notes
- Area: 38 ha (94 acres)
- Architectural style: Mughal
- Owner: Lodi Dynasty (1504–1526); Mughal Empire (1526–1540); Sur Empire (1540–1555); Mughal Empire (1556–1761); Kingdom of Bharatpur (1761–1774); Mughal Empire (1774–1785); Maratha Confederacy (1785–1803); British East India Company (1803–1858); British Raj (1858–1947); Government of India (1947–present day)

UNESCO World Heritage Site
- Criteria: Cultural: (iii)
- Reference: 251
- Inscription: 1983 (7th Session)
- Coordinates: 27°10′46″N 78°01′16″E
- Map of Agra Fort

Agra Fort (Qila Agra), also known as the Red Fort of Agra (Lal-Qila) or Qila-i-Akbari ("Akbar's Fort"), is an historic fort in the city of Agra in Uttar Pradesh, India. A brick fortification on the site, noted as early as 1080 and later known as Badalgarh, was extensively rebuilt in red sandstone by the Mughal emperor Akbar from 1565 to 1573. It served as the main residence of the rulers of the Mughal dynasty until 1638, when the capital was moved from Agra to Shahjahanabad in Delhi. Much of the present interior dates from the reign of Shah Jahan, who added a number of white marble palaces and mosques within the fort after 1628. The Marathas were the last Indian rulers to occupy the fort before it was captured by the British in 1803.

The fort has a semi-circular plan, with its straight side facing the Yamuna river. Its surviving Mughal buildings include the Jahangiri Mahal, Khas Mahal, Diwan-i-Am, Diwan-i-Khas, Musamman Burj, Shish Mahal, Moti Masjid and its two major gateways, the Delhi Gate and Amar Singh Gate.

In 1983, the fort was inscribed as a UNESCO World Heritage Site for its importance during Mughal rule. It is about 2.5 kilometres (1.6 mi) northwest of its sister monument, the Taj Mahal. A substantial portion remains under the control of the Indian Army and is closed to the public.

== History ==
=== Early history and Lodi period ===
The origins of Agra Fort predate the Mughals. An earlier brick fort stood on the site, although its date and builders are uncertain. The earliest known written reference to a fort at Agra appears in accounts of a Ghaznavid raid between 1068 and 1070, when Prince Mahmud (Saif al-Dawla Mahmud), son of Sultan Ibrahim of Ghazna, captured a fortress at Agra from a ruler identified as Gopala of the Rashtrakuta dynasty. The Persian poet Masud Sa'd Salman wrote in his Divan: "The fort of Agra appeared in the midst of the dust / Like a mountain, and its battlements like peaks." There is an enduring local tradition that a fort known as Badalgarh was built by the Rajput ruler Raja Badal Singh on the site in 1475.

In the 15th century, the fort came under the control of the Chauhan Rajputs. Sikandar Khan Lodi, the Sultan of Delhi and ruler of the Lodi dynasty, moved his capital from Delhi to Agra then occupied and developed the existing fort, making Agra the centre of Lodi administration. He died there in 1517. His son, Ibrahim Lodi, held the fort for approximately nine years until 1526, when he was defeated and killed at the First Battle of Panipat, some 270 kilometres (170 mi) north of Agra.

=== Mughal conquest and Akbar's rebuilding ===
Jahangiri Mahal, one of the principal surviving structures from Akbar's rebuilding of Agra Fort

After the First Battle of Panipat in 1526, Babur's son Humayun, who was sent ahead to Agra, captured the family of Bikramajit, the ruler of Gwalior, and received from them a celebrated diamond which has traditionally been identified with the Koh-i-Noor. The Mughals now had control of Agra and its fort; Babur, the founder of the Mughal Empire in South Asia, subsequently arrived at Agra and ruled from the palace of Ibrahim Lodi in the fort.

Humayun was crowned as successor to his father at the fort in 1530. He was defeated at the Battle of Bilgram in 1540 by Sher Shah Suri, the first Sur emperor, and the fort remained under Sur control until 1555, when Humayun recaptured it. Humayun died the following year and was succeeded by his thirteen-year-old son, Akbar. Adil Shah Suri's general, Hemu, recaptured Agra in 1556 and pursued its fleeing governor to Delhi, where Hemu defeated the Mughals at the Battle of Tughlaqabad. Hemu's victory was short-lived; he was defeated by Akbar's forces at the Second Battle of Panipat later that year, restoring Mughal control of Agra.

Akbar made Agra his capital in 1558 and took up residence in the old fort. His historian Abul Fazl noted that the earlier brick fort known as Badalgarh was in a ruined condition. In 1565, Akbar ordered the fort to be rebuilt. The new fort, including its palace complex, was constructed in red sandstone from the Barauli area of Dhaulpur, Rajasthan, with a brick core and sandstone facing. Work began in 1565 and was completed in 1573, employing around 4,000 workers daily for eight years. In 1571, Akbar moved the imperial capital to Fatehpur Sikri, about 35 kilometres (22 mi) west of Agra, where his grandfather, Babur, had earlier established the Bagh-i-Fath ("Garden of Victory"). Constructed mostly between 1571 and 1573, Fatehpur Sikri remained the Mughal capital until Akbar moved the capital to Lahore in 1585.

Much of Akbar's palace complex was later replaced by Shah Jahan's marble structures, but surviving structures from Akbar's reign include the Delhi Gate, the Amar Singh Gate, the Akbari Mahal, and the Jahangiri Mahal. Substantial portions of the fort's red sandstone outer walls also date from Akbar's rebuilding.

=== Shah Jahan's palace development ===
It was during the reign of Akbar's grandson, Shah Jahan, that the site took on its current state. Within the fort, Shah Jahan added a number of white marble structures, including the Diwan-i-Am, the Diwan-i-Khas, the Khas Mahal, the Moti Masjid, and the Musamman Burj. Shah Jahan also built the nearby Taj Mahal in the memory of his wife, Mumtaz Mahal; unlike his grandfather, he favoured buildings made of white marble rather than red sandstone. In 1638, Shah Jahan moved the Mughal capital from Agra to the newly built city of Shahjahanabad in Delhi, ending Agra's status as the primary seat of Mughal government.

=== Aurangzeb and later Mughal period ===
When Shah Jahan suddenly fell ill, a bloody war of succession broke out between his sons, where Aurangzeb was victorious. Aurangzeb would go on to place his father under house arrest in the Musamman Burj of Agra Fort. Shah Jahan remained confined there until his death in 1666, by legend spending his final years gazing out at the Taj Mahal from the tower.

In May 1666, Shivaji came to Agra as per the Treaty of Purandar (1665) with Jai Singh I to meet Aurangzeb in the Diwan-i-Khas. He was deliberately placed behind men of lower rank; insulted, he stormed out of the audience and was confined to Jai Singh's quarters in the fort on 12 May 1666, from where he escaped on 19 August 1666.

As Mughal central authority weakened through the early eighteenth century, Agra and its fort became increasingly vulnerable to outside powers; the Persian ruler Nader Shah's sack of the Mughal capital at Delhi in 1739, during which the Peacock Throne and the Koh-i-Noor diamond were seized from Delhi's Red Fort, is generally seen as marking the accelerating decline of Mughal power that set the stage for Agra's later loss to regional rulers.

=== Jat and Maratha periods ===
In 1761, the Jat ruler Maharaja Suraj Mal of Bharatpur laid siege to Agra Fort, then held by the Mughal faujdar (military governor) Mirza Fazilka Khan. After a month-long siege, the garrison surrendered on 12 June 1761 in exchange for a payment and a grant of five villages, and Agra passed into Jat control. Following their victory, the Jats melted down the fort's silver doors and removed valuables from the Taj Mahal to their capital at Deeg. The fort remained under the rulers of Bharatpur for 13 years, passing from Suraj Mal to his successors Jawahar Singh and Maharaja Ratan Singh; the 'Ratan Singh ki Haveli' built within the fort during this period is associated with the latter. In 1774, the Mughal commander Mirza Najaf Khan recaptured Agra for the empire.

In 1752, the Mughal wazir (chief minister) Safdar Jang entered into a defensive agreement with the Marathas on behalf of the emperor, under which the Marathas undertook to defend the Mughal Empire against internal and external enemies, and the Peshwa (Maratha prime minister) was to be appointed governor of Agra, Mathura, Narnaul, and Ajmer. The Maratha Empire had suffered a catastrophic defeat at the Third Battle of Panipat against Ahmad Shah Durrani in January 1761, which halted further Maratha advances in northern India and destabilised their territories there for roughly a decade. From 1771, however, Mahadaji Shinde re-established Maratha influence in the region, escorting Emperor Shah Alam II back to Delhi and campaigning against the Jats and Rohillas. Agra came under Maratha control in 1785, when forces under Mahadji Shinde captured the fort after a siege, which ended with its surrender on 27 March.

=== British period ===
The British East India Company took Agra Fort from the Marathas during the Second Anglo-Maratha War in 1803. Under British control, the fort's character changed substantially: most of its roughly 500 original Mughal-era buildings, according to the court historian Abul Fazl's count, had already been thinned by Shah Jahan's own demolitions to make way for his marble palaces, but the British destroyed most of the remainder to raise military barracks. Fewer than 30 Mughal-era structures survive today, concentrated on the fort's southeastern side facing the river.

During the British period, the fort became associated with the controversial "Ghazni Gates". In 1842, following the British withdrawal from Kabul at the end of the First Anglo-Afghan War, Lord Ellenborough issued the "Proclamation of the Gates," ordering troops returning through Ghazni to remove a pair of carved wooden gates from the tomb of Mahmud of Ghazni, which he claimed were the sandalwood gates originally looted from the Somnath temple some 800 years earlier. A regiment of Jat sepoys carried the gates back to India, where they were installed in Agra Fort's arsenal store-room. On examination, however, the gates proved to be made of deodar wood native to Ghazni rather than sandalwood, and their carved decoration bore no resemblance to Gujarati craftsmanship, discrediting Ellenborough's claim; historian Romila Thapar has argued that no contemporary Persian or Indic source corroborates the existence of any such gates at Somnath at all. The episode was debated in the House of Commons the following year and contributed to Ellenborough's recall as Governor-General.

During the Indian rebellion of 1857 the fort served as a refuge for the British at the Battle of Agra. Lieutenant-Governor John Russell Colvin died there of cholera in September 1857, and was buried in front of the Diwan-i-Am, where his tomb remains. The rebellion caused the end of the East India Company's rule in India, and led to a century of direct rule in India by Britain.

=== Modern period and UNESCO recognition ===
In 1983, the Agra fort was inscribed as a UNESCO World Heritage Site because of its importance during Mughal rule. A substantial portion of the fort remains under the control of the Indian Army and is closed to public access, including the Delhi Gate and several historic structures. There have been periodic calls from local officials for the army to vacate these areas, as was done at the Red Fort in Delhi in 2003, but as of 2026 no such transfer had taken place.

The fort's ongoing conservation is complicated by urban air pollution in Agra, reduced flow and pollution in the adjacent Yamuna river, and heavy visitor traffic, all of which contribute to the deterioration of its sandstone and marble surfaces. A proposed "Taj Corridor" riverfront development near the fort and the Taj Mahal was halted following a 2004 joint UNESCO–ICOMOS monitoring mission that raised concerns about its potential impact on the site's heritage values. The Archaeological Survey of India continues to carry out periodic restoration work at the fort, including fortification and structural repairs undertaken in 2021.

The fort is one of India's most-visited monuments; in the 2023–24 financial year it drew approximately 218,000 foreign visitors and generated over ₹15 crore (approximately US$1.6 million or £1.2 million) in ticket revenue, the fourth-highest of any monument managed by the Archaeological Survey of India. It is open to visitors throughout the year and is one of the five ticketed monuments in Agra covered by the Agra Development Authority's pathkar (toll) scheme, under which the toll paid by foreign visitors at one participating monument is valid at the others for the remainder of the same day.

== Layout ==
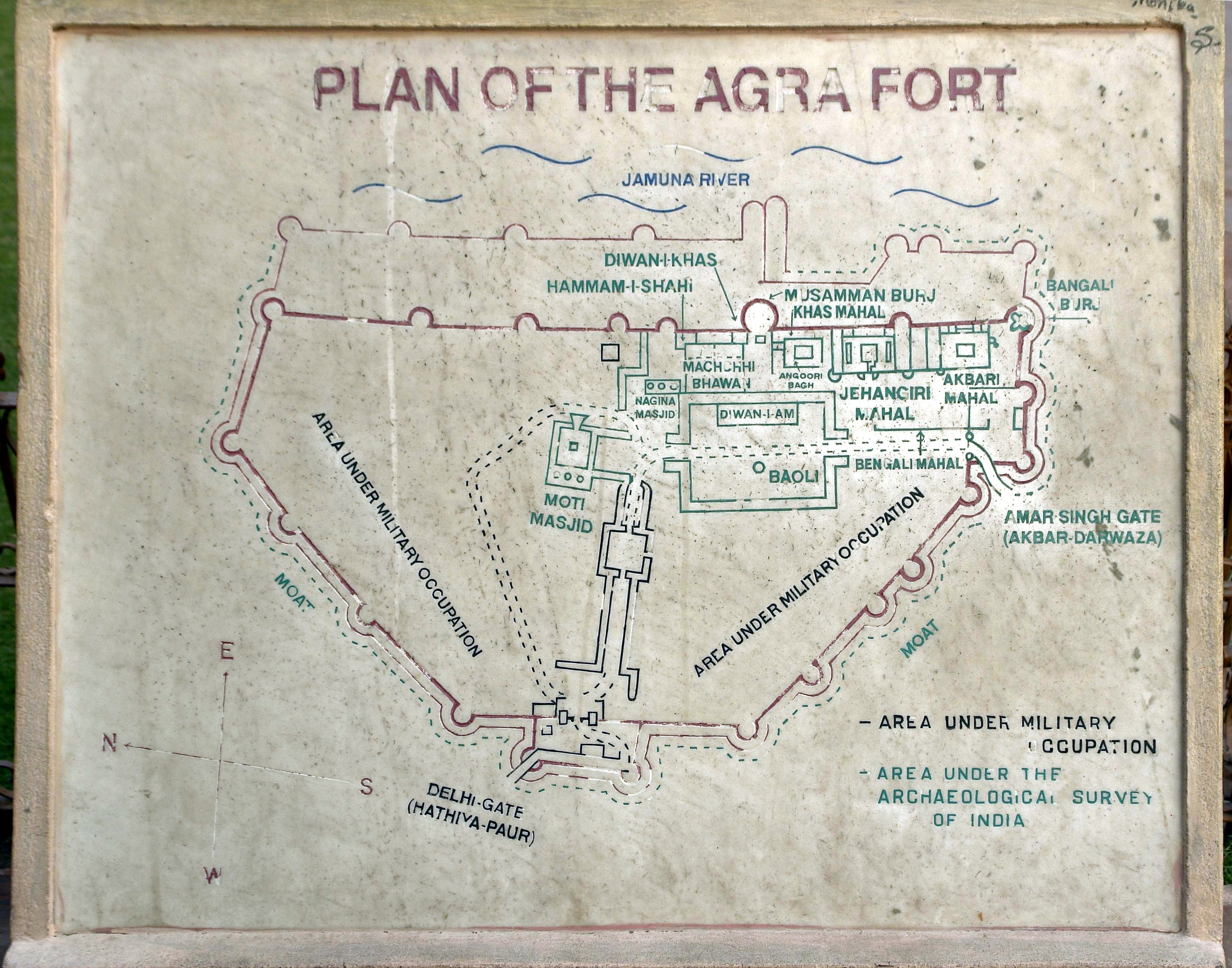
Plan of Agra Fort on display at the fort, 2012

The fort occupies about 380,000 square metres (94 acres) on the west bank of the Yamuna river. It has a roughly semi-circular plan, with the curved side facing inland to the west and the straight side running parallel to the river on the east. The outer defences consist of double ramparts of red sandstone, about 70 feet (21 m) high, with massive circular bastions at intervals, utilising battlements, embrasures, and machicolations.

Four gates were originally provided, one of which, the Khizri Gate, opened onto the river. The two main surviving entrances are the Delhi Gate on the west wall, which was the formal public entrance, and the Amar Singh Gate on the south, which forms the present visitor entrance. Both gates incorporate a bent entrance and were originally protected by a moat and drawbridge. The Delhi Gate complex includes an inner gateway known as the Hathi Pol. The northern portion of the fort is still used by the Indian military, so the Delhi Gate cannot be used by the public.

The interior is divided between the earlier red sandstone palace zone to the south, dating mainly from Akbar's rebuilding, and the white marble palace zone to the southeast facing the river, dating mainly from Shah Jahan's reign. Most of the Mughal buildings that survive today are concentrated on the southeastern riverfront side. According to the historian Abul Fazl, about 500 buildings were erected within the fort during Akbar's reign; many were later removed by Shah Jahan to make way for his marble palaces, and most of the remainder were demolished during British rule between 1803 and 1862 to build barracks, leaving fewer than 30 Mughal structures standing.

== Principal structures ==
The principal structures forming today's Agra Fort include its massive ramparts and gateways; the Delhi Gate and the Hathi Pol within it, both major architectural works of Akbar's reign; the Amar Singh Gate and Akbari Gate; the Diwan-i-Am and Diwan-i-Khas; the Jahangiri Mahal, Shah Jahani Mahal and Khas Mahal; the Anguri Bagh; the Shish Mahal and Musamman Burj; and the Moti Masjid.

Other surviving structures and features include the Daulat Khana, Akbari Mahal, an imperial hammam, Jahangir's Hauz, Jahangir's Chain of Justice, and the Ghaznin Gate.

=== Delhi Gate ===
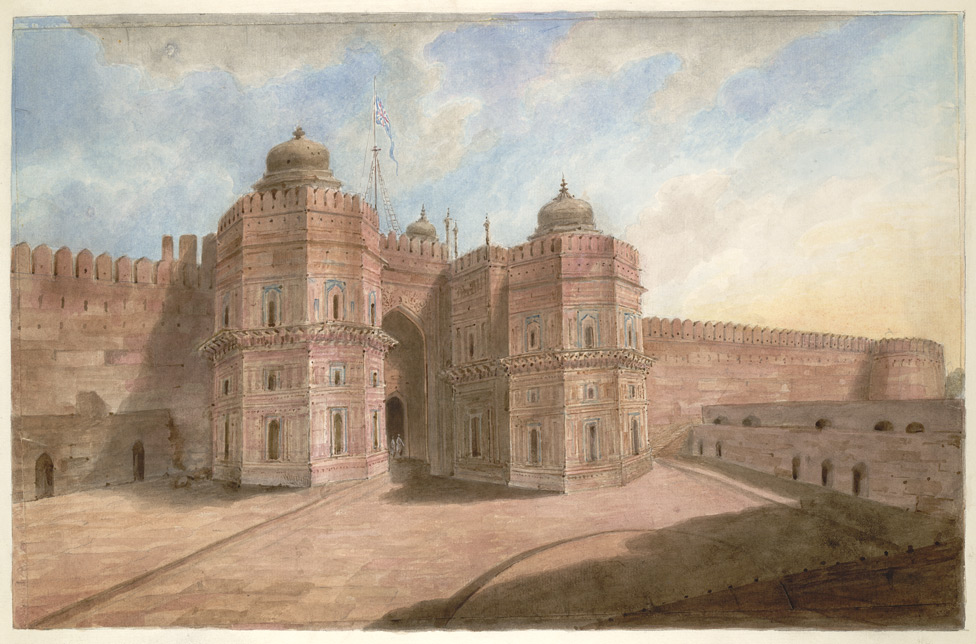
Delhi Gate in 1814–15, painted by Seeta Ram

The Delhi Gate is the principal western entrance to Agra Fort and one of the major architectural works of Akbar's reign. The gate formed part of the original public approach to the fort, leading from the city through the Hathi Pol ("Elephant Gate") towards the main market street and the Diwan-i-Am. The fort's western gate complex was protected by a barbican, while the gate itself was constructed of red sandstone and incorporated a covered passage and projecting defensive elements.

The gate displays a combination of defensive architecture and elaborate architectural decoration characteristic of Akbar's buildings at Agra Fort. The surviving entrance arch is of reddish stone, while the gateway's details combine structural forms and decorative motifs associated with the regional architectural traditions incorporated into Akbar's architecture. The original public entrance was the Hathi Pol immediately beyond the Delhi Gate; from there a 226-metre market street extended eastwards towards the courtyard of the Diwan-i-Am.

The Delhi Gate was therefore the principal entrance for public movement into the fort, in contrast to the southern gate complex, which was associated with the imperial family. The two entrance complexes formed part of the fort's original circulation system: the east–west axis carried the public route, while the north–south axis led towards the imperial residential quarters along the Yamuna.

The monumental Delhi Gate, which faces the city on the western side of the fort, is considered the grandest of the four gates and a masterpiece of Akbar's time. It was built circa 1568 both to enhance security and as the king's formal gate; it includes features related to both. It is embellished with intricate inlay work in white marble. A wooden drawbridge was used to cross the moat and reach the gate from the mainland; inside, an inner gateway called Hathi Pol ("Elephant Gate") – guarded by two life-sized stone elephants with their riders – added another layer of security. The drawbridge, slight ascent, and 90-degree turn between the outer and inner gates make the entrance impregnable. During a siege, attackers would employ elephants to crush a fort's gates. Without a level, straight run-up to gather speed, however, that is prevented by this layout.

=== Amar Singh Gate and Akbari Gate ===
Amar Singh Gate

The Amar Singh Gate forms the outer part of the southern entrance complex; which also contains the inner Akbari Gate, dating from Akbar's rebuilding of the fort. The outer gateway was added in the 17th century during the reign of Aurangzeb, when an additional defensive wall was constructed around the earlier fortifications. The name of the outer gate is popularly attributed to Amar Singh Rathore, a Rajput noble at Shah Jahan's court who is said to have killed the emperor's treasurer, Salabat Khan, within the fort before leaping the ramparts on horseback in a failed attempt at escaping. The southern entrance is sometimes referred to in popular guidebooks as the Lahore Gate because it faces towards Lahore. The gate is similar in plan to the Delhi Gate on the west; both are built of red sandstone with a bent entrance.

=== Diwan-i-Am ===
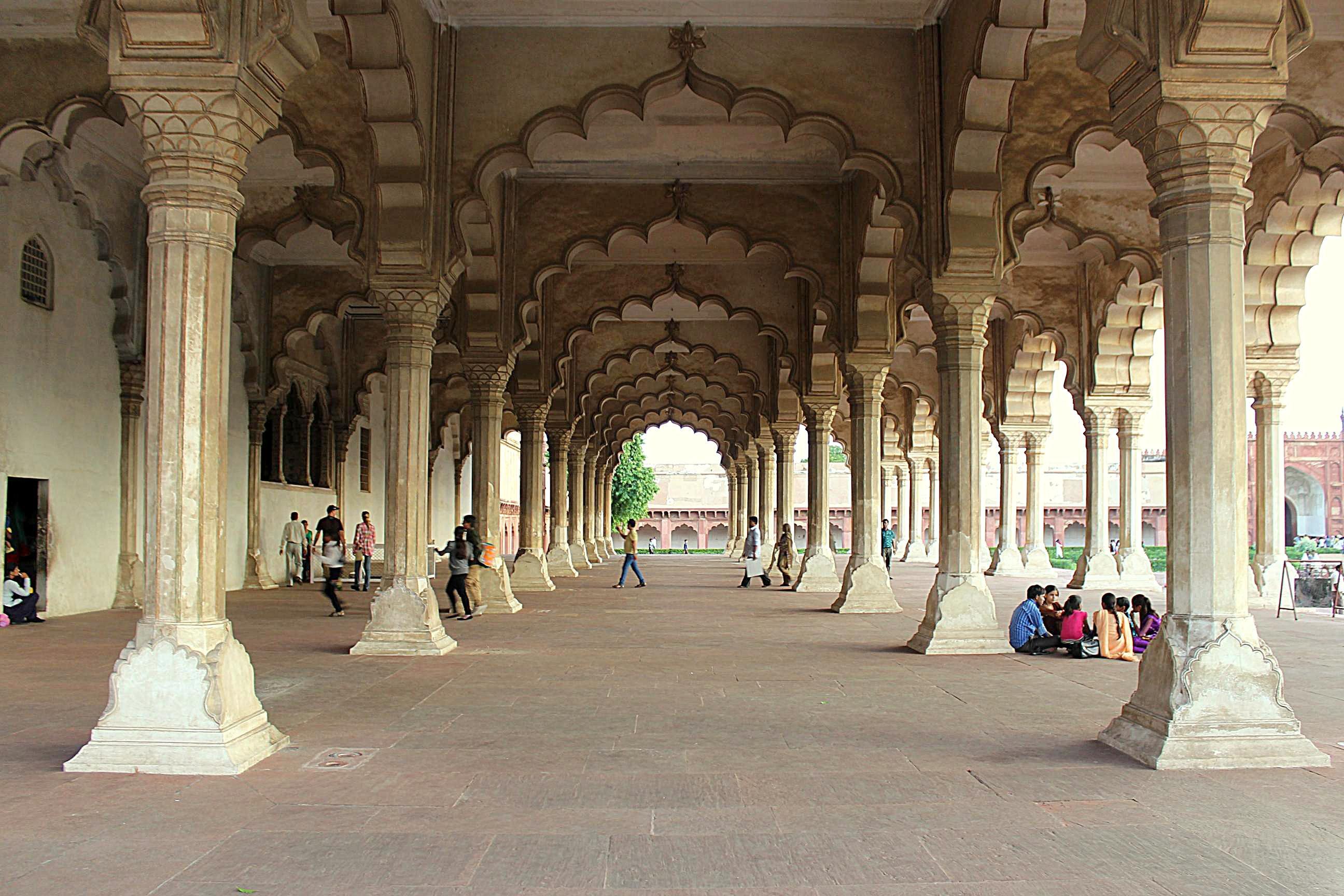
Diwan-i-Aam, Hall of Public Audience

The Diwan-i-Am ("Hall of Public Audience") was the first structure Shah Jahan commissioned at Agra Fort after his accession in 1628, and was completed the same year. It was where the emperor and his successors met the general public and heard petitions and complaints. The hall was originally a rectangular wooden structure supported on forty pillars; it was later rebuilt in red sandstone, plastered over with white shell-lime stucco to resemble marble, with its ceiling and columns painted and gilded. Divided into three sections beneath a flat roof, it is entered through two arched red sandstone gateways on its north and south sides. A marble canopy at the centre of its eastern wall sheltered the emperor's throne; the chamber connected to the royal apartments behind it, allowing the women of the court to observe proceedings from screened marble windows. The hall's design served as a model for the similar public audience halls built later at Shah Jahan's forts in Lahore and Delhi.

=== Diwan-i-Khas ===
The Diwan-i-Khas ("Hall of Private Audience") was built by Shah Jahan and completed around 1637, for the reception of foreign dignitaries, nobles, and state guests in private, and for confidential matters of government. It comprises two connected halls: an outer, columned hall open on three sides, covered by a flat roof carried on multifoil arches springing from finely carved marble pillars inlaid with semi-precious stones in floral patterns; and an inner, enclosed hall known as the Tambi Khana. A Persian inscription in the inner hall, inlaid in black stone and dated 1636–37, likens the chamber to the highest heaven, and the emperor to the sun. The hall overlooks a riverside marble platform that once held two thrones, one white and one black; the Peacock Throne is traditionally said to have stood here, and it was in this hall that Shivaji met Aurangzeb in 1666.

=== Jahangiri Mahal ===
The Jahangiri Mahal was built by Akbar for his son Jahangir; it is one of the earliest surviving buildings of Akbar's reign, and the largest residence still standing within the fort. It served as the main zenana of the imperial women, housing the Rajput wives of Akbar, including his chief consort, Mariam-uz-Zamani. Constructed of red sandstone, the palace blends Hindu and Islamic architectural elements, including carved brackets, decorative arches, and regional architectural features associated with the building traditions of Gujarat and Bengal.

A large courtyard at its centre contains an octagonal marble cistern; the palace's eastern facade, overlooking the river, is distinguished by especially elaborate surface treatment relative to the rest of the building. The monolithic stone cistern known as Jahangir's Hauz, carved in 1611, originally stood in front of the palace.

=== Shah Jahani Mahal ===
Shah Jahani Mahal, built between 1628 and 1635, and situated between the white-marble Khas Mahal and the red-sandstone Jahangiri Mahal, is Shah Jahan's earliest attempt at adapting an existing red-sandstone building at Agra Fort into a palace in his own architectural style. It contains a large hall, side rooms and an octagonal tower on the riverside. Its brick and red-sandstone structure was covered with thick white stucco plaster and painted with floral designs, giving the building the appearance of white marble. On the side facing the Khas Mahal is a large white-marble, or pillared gallery. with five arches supported on double pillars and protected externally by a chhajja. Its western bay was closed to accommodate the Ghaznin Gate, while Babur's baoli (stepped well) and a separate well are situated beneath it.

=== Khas Mahal ===
The Khas Mahal is a white marble palace built by Shah Jahan, serving as the residence of his daughters Jahanara and Roshanara. Its central chamber, the Aramghar, served as the emperor's sleeping quarters, flanked on either side by identical pavilions roofed with curved Bengal-style chhajjas; the southern pavilion was associated with Jahanara, while the northern one, the Bangla-i-Darshan, was used by the emperor to appear before subjects gathered below. The interior is decorated with gilded ceilings, marble alcoves, and painted decoration with gilded details.

=== Anguri Bagh ===
Anguri Bagh with Khas Mahal in the background

The Anguri Bagh ("Grape Garden") is a geometric charbagh garden in front of the Khas Mahal, laid out by Shah Jahan around the year 1637. It is divided into four sections by paved paths, with a marble-paved platform at its centre. Narrow two-storey buildings, which have been identified as the zenana, or secluded living area for the women of the imperial household, border the garden on its north, south and west sides; the three marble structures of the Khas Mahal form its eastern side. The garden was associated with the cultivation of grapes and flowers, from which its name is traditionally derived, and water was supplied to its ponds and baths from tanks near the Jahangiri Mahal.

=== Shish Mahal ===
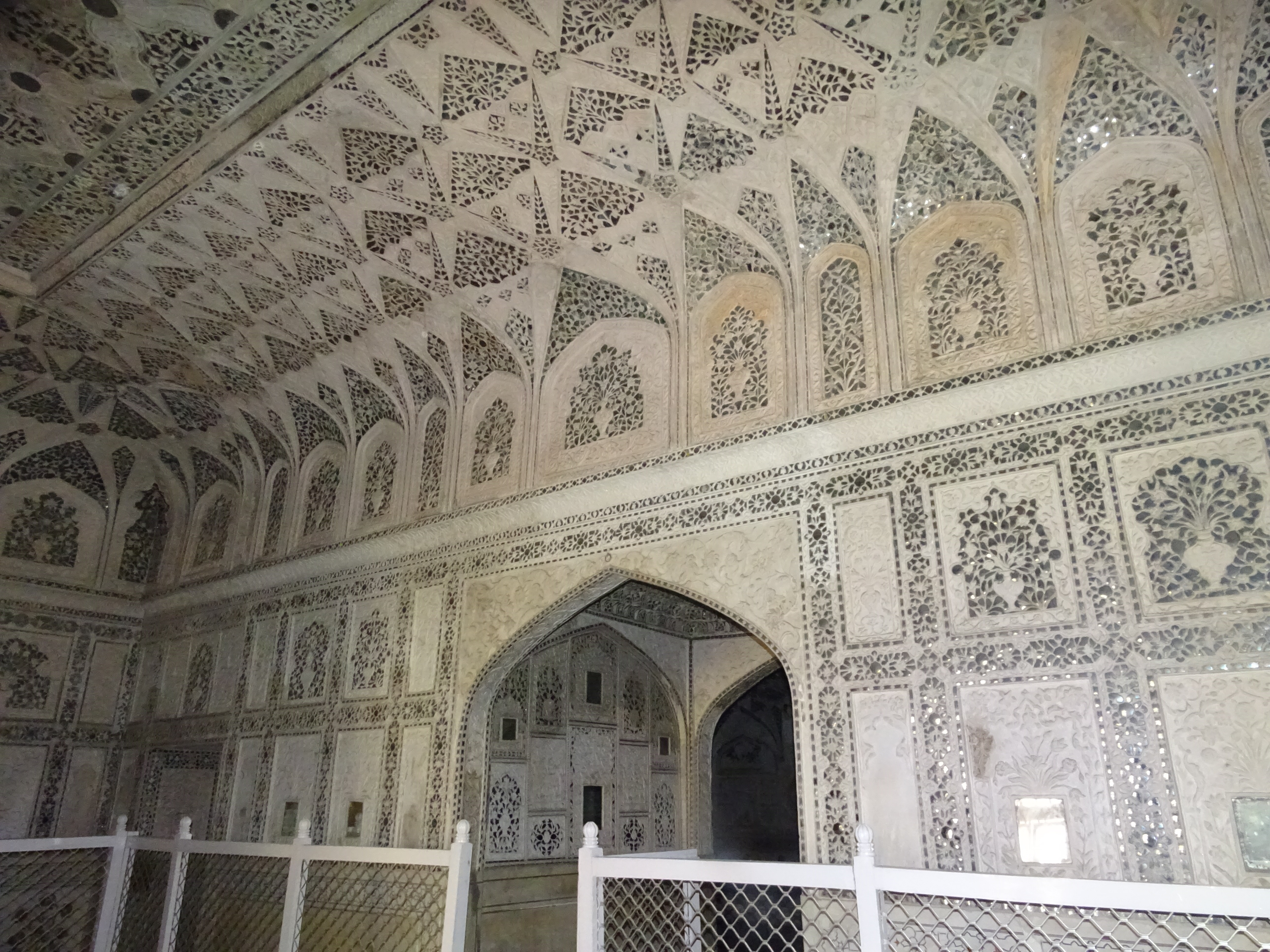
Shish Mahal

The Shish Mahal (شیش محل, "Glass Palace") is a mirrored bathing chamber within the summer palace complex, together with the Khas Mahal and Musamman Burj, built by Shah Jahan between 1631 and 1640. The name derives from the extensive glass mosaic decoration on its walls and ceilings. Small pieces of mirror glass were arranged into decorative patterns, producing reflective effects when illuminated. The glass used in the decoration is traditionally said to have been imported from Haleb (Aleppo), Syria, then an important centre for glass production.

The building is on the western side of the Musamman Burj (Shah Burj), beneath the Diwan-i-Khas. It was designed as a royal bathing chamber and dressing room, with arrangements for water supply through tanks and fountains. Shah Jahan constructed other Shish Mahals at Lahore Fort and the Red Fort, Delhi, reflecting the Mughal taste for mirrored interiors and decorative glasswork.

=== Musamman Burj ===
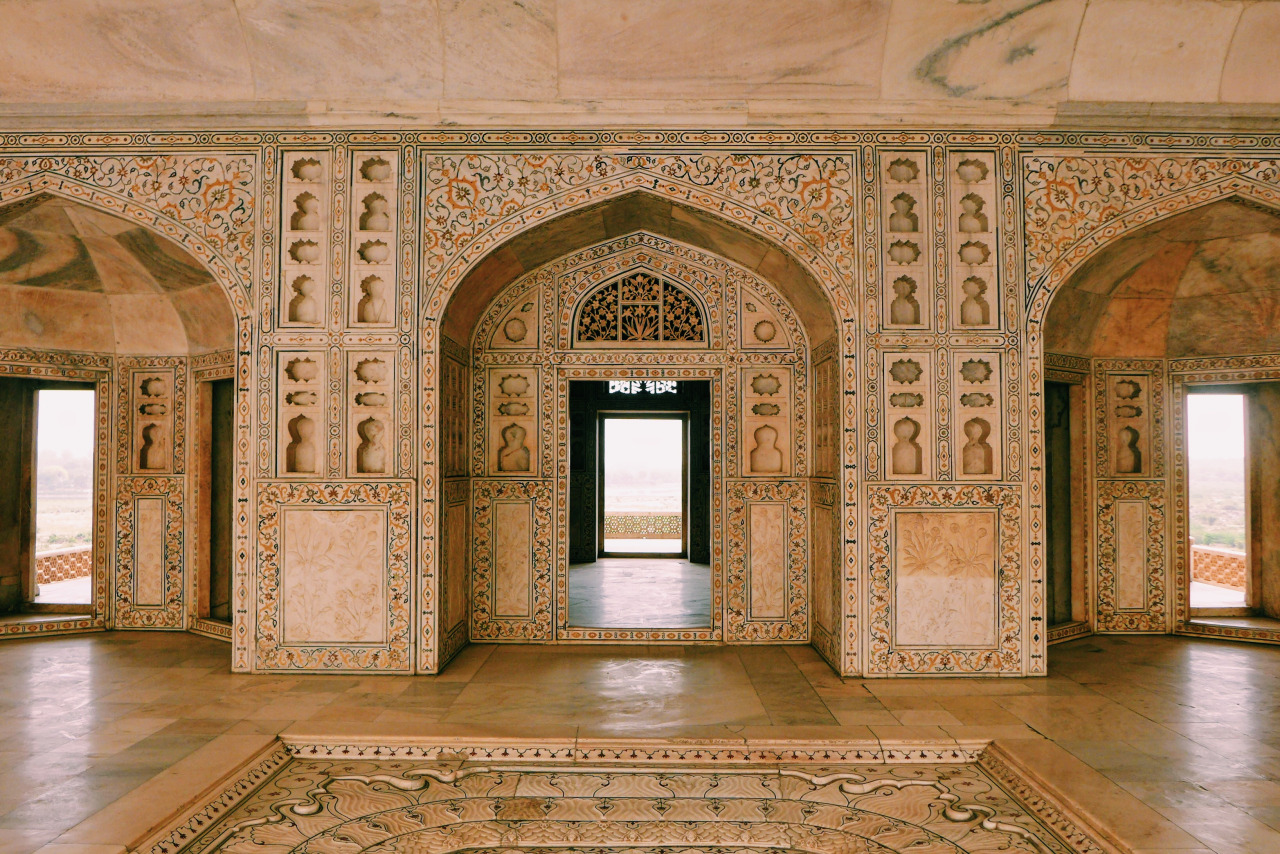
Musamman Burj inside

The Musamman Burj (Shah Burj) and its associated Jharokha (window balcony), rebuilt in white marble between 1632 and 1640 CE, sit on top of the largest bastion of Agra Fort, on the riverside, facing east. It was originally built of red stone by Akbar, who used it for jharokha darshan — a daily public appearance from a palace window — as well as for sun worship at sunrise. Jahangir also used it as a jharokha, as shown in a painting made in 1620, and instituted his Adl-i-Zanjir ("Chain of Justice") on its southern side. Owing to its octagonal plan, it was called the Musamman Burj; Persian historians and foreign travellers also referred to it as the Shah Burj ("imperial" or "king's tower"). The contemporary Mughal court historian Abdul Hamid Lahori recorded the name "Samman Burj" ("Jasmine Tower"), which the fort's own descriptive plaque calls a misnomer. It was rebuilt in white marble by Shah Jahan around 1632–1640, who likewise used it for jharokha darshan, an institution considered as indispensable to Mughal rule as the imperial darbar.

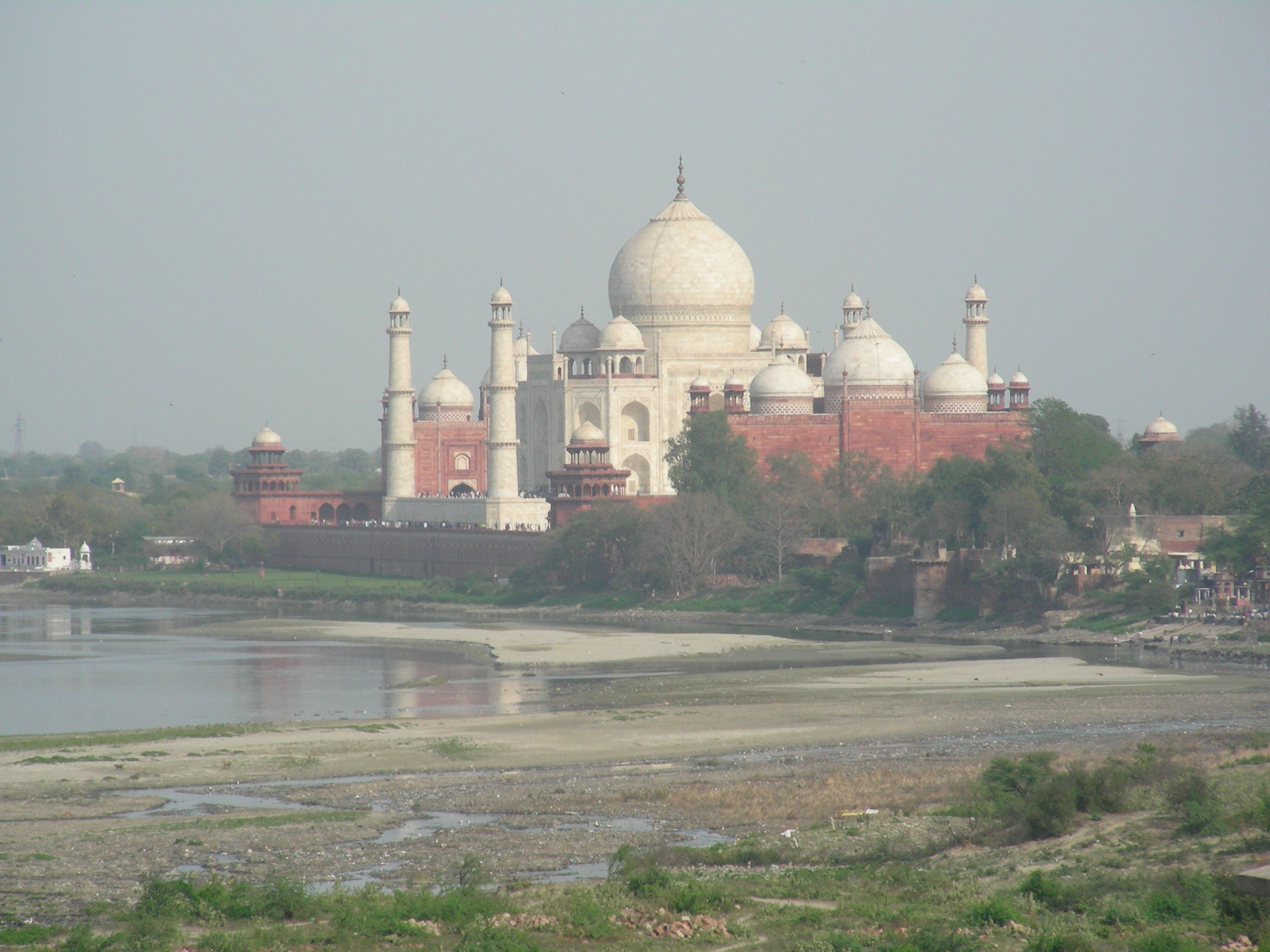
The view of Taj Mahal and Yamuna river

Five of its eight external sides form a dalan (colonnaded hall) overlooking the river, each with pillar-and-bracket openings, with the easternmost side projecting forward to accommodate a jharokha. Its western side opens onto a spacious dalan with shah-nashin (alcoves) and a shallow water basin sunk into the pavement, profusely inlaid with decoration. This dalan in turn opens onto a court with a chabutara screened by a jali, a series of rooms leading to the Shish Mahal to the west, and a colonnade with an attached room to the south. Built entirely of white marble, its walls feature deep niches and dados inlaid with repetitive stylised creeper patterns, while its pillars, brackets, and lintels carry inlaid floral designs — among the most ornamented of Shah Jahan's buildings. The complex connects directly to the Diwan-i-Khas, Shish Mahal, and Khas Mahal, and afforded a full view of the Taj Mahal.

Shah Jahan spent the final eight years of his life, from 1658 to 1666, imprisoned in this complex by his son Aurangzeb, and is traditionally said to have died here while gazing at the Taj Mahal; his body was subsequently taken by boat to the Taj Mahal for burial.

=== Moti Masjid ===
The Moti Masjid ("Pearl Mosque") is the fort's principal mosque, built by Shah Jahan between 1646 and 1653. It was completed after the Mughal capital had shifted to Shahjahanabad in Delhi in 1648. Clad entirely in white marble, its comparatively unornamented design contrasts with the more heavily decorated red sandstone buildings elsewhere in the fort. It stands on a raised plinth to the north of the Diwan-i-Am, within a walled enclosure, and its plan was modelled on the Friday mosque Shah Jahan had earlier built at Ajmer.

=== Other structures ===
Jahangir's Hauz, a large stone cistern possibly used for bathing

Jahangir's Hauz

Jahangir's Hauz (Jahangir's Bath) is a large monolithic stone cistern made for Jahangir in 1611. It is nearly 5 feet (1.5 m) high and 8 feet (2.4 m) in diameter, with steps on both its inner and outer surfaces, and may have been used for bathing. A Persian inscription around the rim names Jahangir, son of Akbar, and identifies the object as the Hauz-i-Jahangiri ("Cistern of Jahangir"). The cistern is thought to have originally been in one of the courts of the imperial palace. It was later moved in front of the Diwan-i-Am, and subsequently to the Company Bagh, before being returned to Agra Fort in the early twentieth century.

Jahangir's Chain of Justice

Jahangir's Chain of Justice (Zanjir-i-Adl) was installed shortly after his accession in 1605. In his memoir, the Tuzk-e-Jahangiri, Jahangir says the chain was intended to provide a direct means for petitioners to bring grievances to the emperor when justice had been delayed or denied by officials. Contemporary European accounts also refer to Jahangir's arrangements for receiving complaints and administering justice. William Hawkins, who visited Jahangir's court between 1608 and 1611, described the emperor's judicial proceedings and referred to the chain.

Jahangir ordered the chain to be made of pure gold, 30 gaz in length and fitted with 60 bells. One end was attached to the battlements of the Shah Burj at Agra Fort and the other to a stone post on the bank of the Yamuna river.

Ghaznin Gate

The Ghaznin Gate is a wooden gate formerly associated with the tomb of Mahmud of Ghazni at Ghazni. It was brought to India by the British in 1842 following the capture of Ghazni during the First Anglo-Afghan War. Lord Ellenborough claimed that the gates were those of the Somnath temple, supposedly removed by Mahmud in 1025; the identification was subsequently shown to be erroneous. The gate is made of deodar wood rather than sandalwood and its decoration is consistent with a Ghazni origin rather than the traditional Gujarati attribution. An Arabic inscription in Kufic script on the upper part invokes blessings on Mahmud and gives his titles. The gate was subsequently installed at the fort, where it remains.

== In culture ==
India Post issued stamps featuring the Agra Fort to commemorate the Aga Khan Award for Architecture in 2004. The fort plays a key role in the Sherlock Holmes mystery The Sign of the Four by Sir Arthur Conan Doyle, published in 1892 in the Strand Magazine, where it is the site of the theft of the Agra treasure.

The song "Dhunki" from Mere Brother Ki Dulhan (2011) was filmed at the fort.

For video games, in the second expansion pack for Age of Empires III: The Asian Dynasties, Agra Fort is one of five wonders for the Indian civilization to advance to the next age.

== Gallery ==
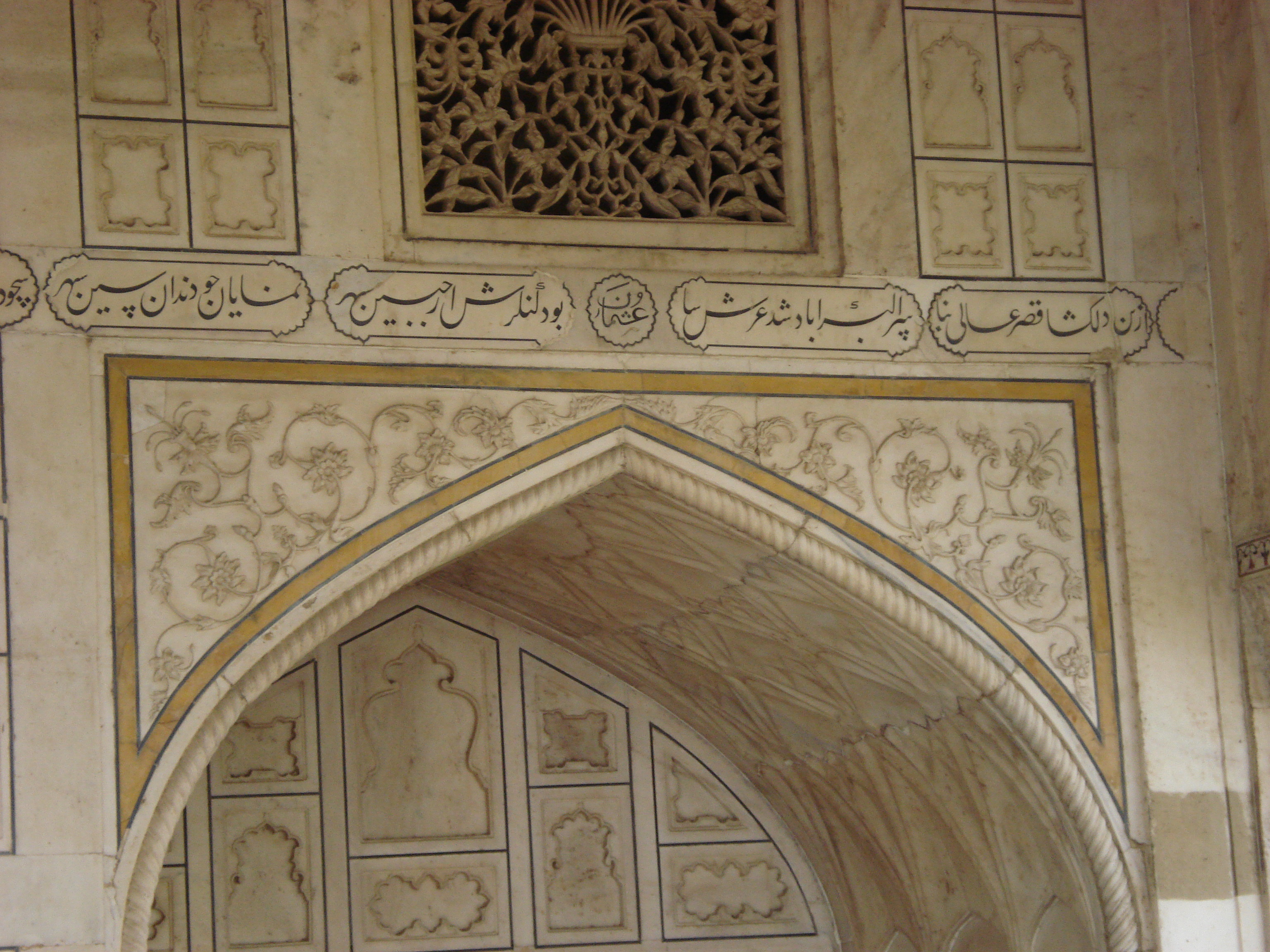
Persian Calligraphy in Agra Fort

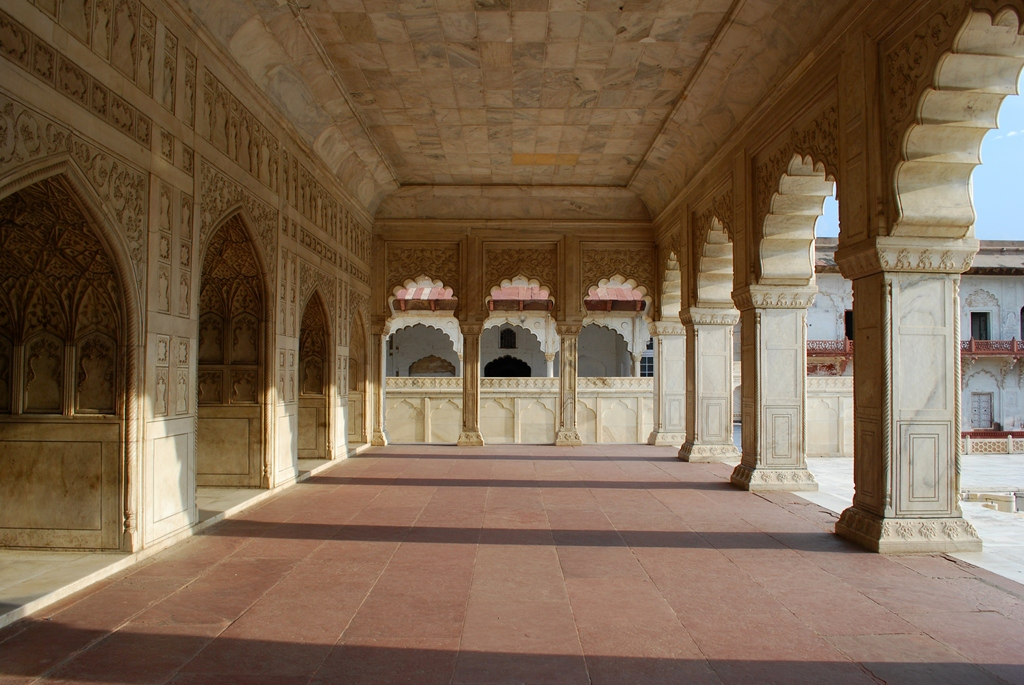
Diwan-i-Khas

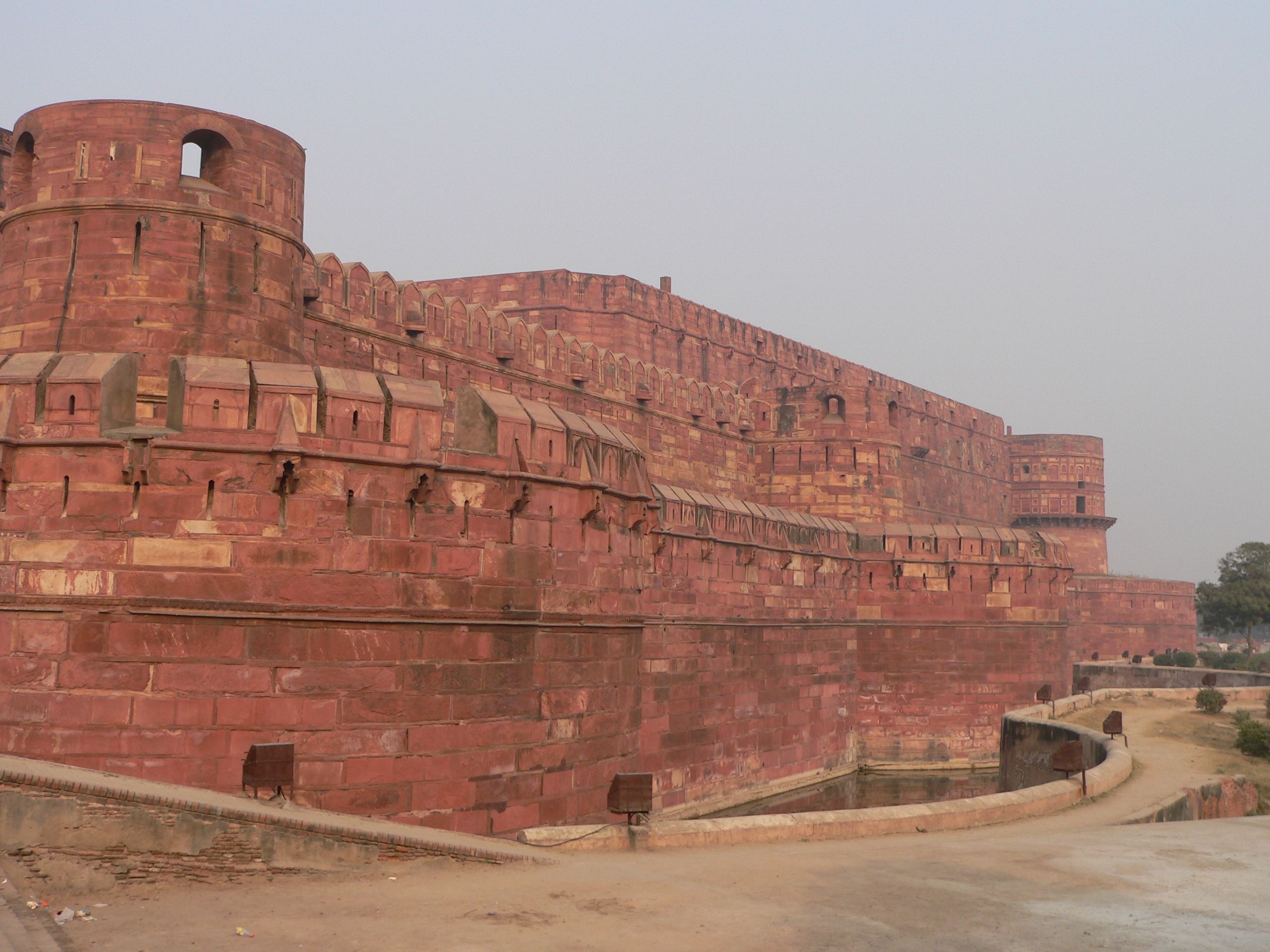
Rampart of Agra Fort

== See also ==
- Jama Masjid, Agra
- List of Monuments of National Importance in Agra circle
