= Black Taj Mahal =

- Location in western Uttar Pradesh, India
- 27°10′43.21″N 78°02′31.37″E
- Location: Agra

History
- Built: Was never built

Site notes
- Elevation: 6.1 metres (20 ft)
- Architectural style: Mughal architecture

The Black Taj Mahal was a legendary black marble mausoleum that is said to have been planned to be built across the Yamuna River opposite the Taj Mahal in Agra, Uttar Pradesh, India. Mughal emperor Shah Jahan is said to have desired a mausoleum for himself similar to that of the one he had built in memory of his second wife, Mumtaz Mahal.

A French traveller by the name of Jean Baptiste Tavernier who visited Agra in 1665 first mentioned the idea of Black Taj in his fanciful writings. The writings of Tavernier mention that Shah Jahan began to build his own tomb on the other side of the river but could not complete it as he was deposed by his own son Aurangzeb. However, many modern archaeologists believe this story to be myth.

== Background ==
Ever since the construction of Taj Mahal, the building has been the source of an admiration transcending culture and geography, and so personal and emotional responses have consistently eclipsed scholastic appraisals of the monument.

— Jean-Baptiste Tavernier, one of the first European visitors to the Taj Mahal

The belief holds that Shah Jahan planned a mausoleum to be built in black marble across the Yamuna River, with the two structures connected by a bridge. The idea originates from the fanciful writings of Jean-Baptiste Tavernier, a European traveller who visited Agra in 1665. It was suggested that Shah Jahan was overthrown by his son Aurangzeb, before it could be built. Ruins of blackened marble across the river in the Moonlight Garden, Mahtab Bagh, seemed to support this legend. According to historian Mohammad Naushad, when the Mughal emperor Shah Jahan came to Burhanpur on a military campaign, he had brought his wife Mumtaz Mahal along. Mumtaz had 3 deliveries in Burhanpur and died giving birth to their fourteenth child. According to Mumtaz's wish, Shah Jahan built the Taj Mahal in her memory. For six months, Mumtaz was buried in Burhanpur itself. It is called Pine Garden. Shah Jahan wished that the Taj Mahal should be built in Burhanpur itself. Due to the presence of termites in the soil and the low water level of the River Tapti, the architect of that time advised not to build the Taj Mahal here. 65 quality marble was to be installed in the Taj Mahal, which was difficult to bring here from Rajasthan and Iran at that time, but the base design of the Taj Mahal was made in Burhanpur. A replica of this is present in Shah Nawaz Khan's tomb in Burhanpur. This tomb is also called the Black Taj Mahal of Burhanpur. According to historian Mohammad Naushad, Shah Nawaz Khan was the eldest son of Abdul Rahim Khankhana. He was brought up in Burhanpur itself. Seeing his bravery, he was made the commander of the Mughal army. He died at the age of 44, buried on the banks of the Utawali River in Burhanpur.

== Myth ==
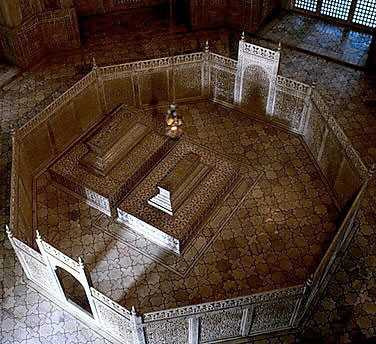
The tomb of Shah Jahan is offset from the centre of his wife Mumtaz Mahal in the Taj Mahal, giving rise to the speculation that his tomb was meant to be somewhere else

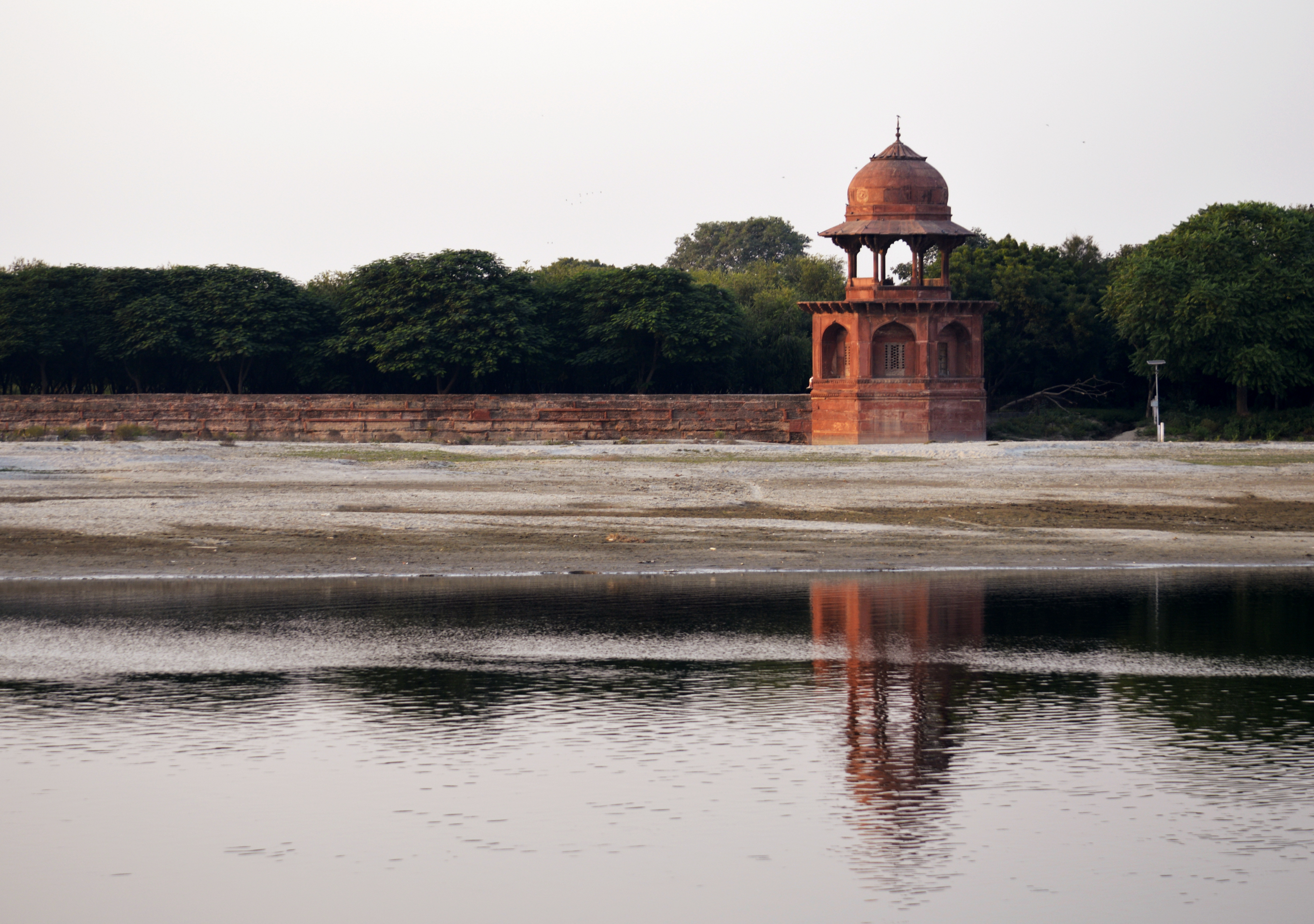
Remaining southeastern red sandstone corner tower of the enclosure at the river bank of the Mehtab Bagh, across the river from the Taj Mahal

Many scholars, like Ram Nath, believe the idea of the Black Taj belongs to fiction rather than history. The traces which are identified as the foundations of the second Taj are actually the enclosing wall of a garden founded by Babur. The irregular position of Shah Jahan's cenotaph in comparison to Mumtaz Mahal's, is similar to that at the tomb of Itmad-ud-Daulah, and thus should not be of any striking significance. Besides, according to Islamic law, bodies are buried with their faces towards Mecca and legs towards the south, and the husband is placed on the right hand side of his wife. The interpretation that the cenotaph of Shah Jahan was not meant to be placed here appears to be superfluous.

== Modern excavations ==
Excavations carried out in the 1990s found that there were discolored white stones that had turned black. As some believe that a more credible theory for the origins of the black mausoleum was demonstrated in 2006 by archaeologists who reconstructed part of the pool in the Mehtab Bagh (Moonlight Garden). A dark reflection of the white mausoleum could clearly be seen, befitting Shah Jahan's obsession with symmetry and the positioning of the pool itself.
