= Muthamman Burj =

Muthamman Burj or Musamman Burj could refer to

- Muthamman Burj (Red Fort)
- Musamman Burj (Agra Fort)
