= Toorji Ka Jhalra =

- तूरजी का झालरा
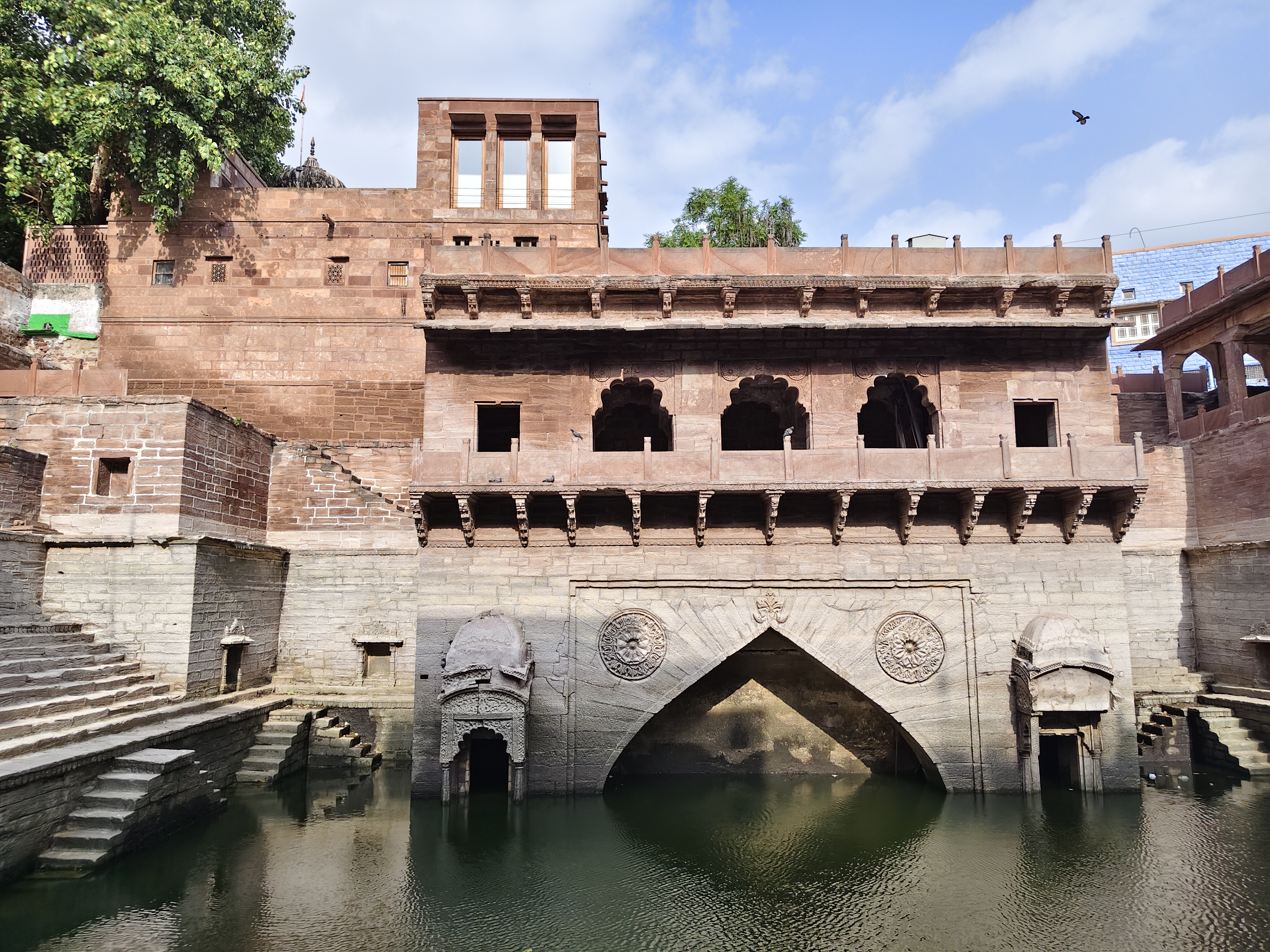
- Toorji Ka Jhalra, 2026

General information
- Location: Jodhpur, Rajasthan, India
- Coordinates: 26°17′50″N 73°01′23″E
- Year built: 1740s

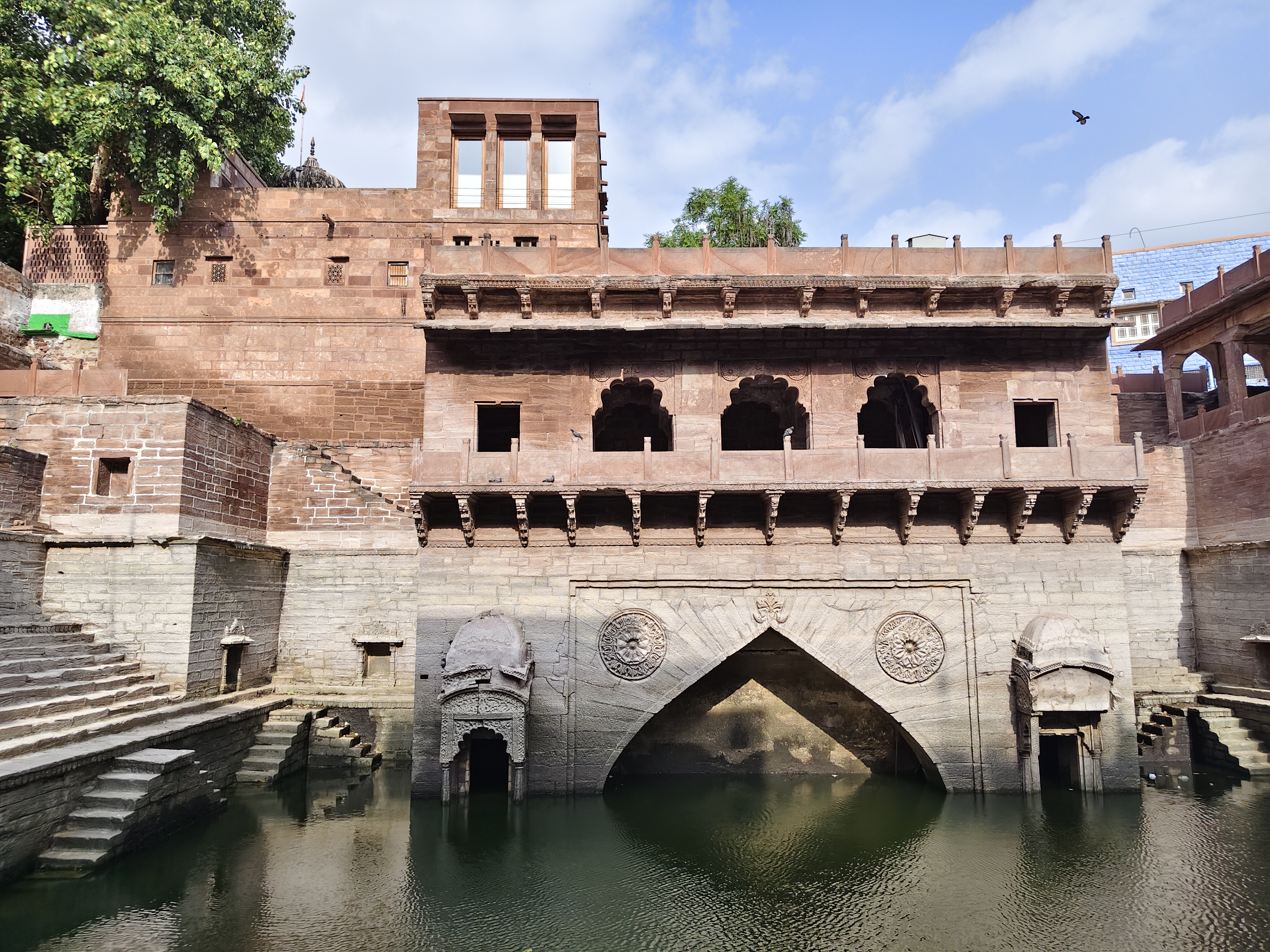
Toorji Ka Jhalra (Toorji's Step Well), a historic stepwell located in Jodhpur, Rajasthan, India. The stepwell features traditional Rajasthani architecture and intricately carved sandstone steps.

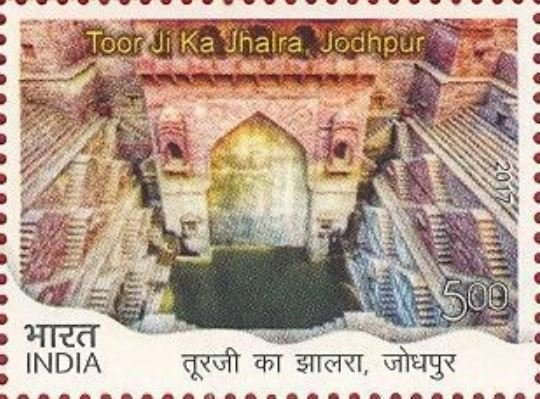
Postage stamp featuring Turji Ka Jhalra, Jodhpur

Turji Ka Jhalra also known as Toor Ji Ka Jhalra or Tanwarji Ka Jhalara) is a stepwell (jhalra) in the northwestern Indian city of Jodhpur, Rajasthan.

== Location ==
Turji Ka Jhalra is situated amid the narrow lanes of Jodhpur's old city, approximately 100 m west of Gulab Sagar and about 300 m east of Mehrangarh Fort . Even many local residents are unfamiliar with its location, and it is therefore best located using its GPS coordinates.

== History ==
Some sources date the construction of Turji Ka Jhalra to the 6th century, which would make it one of the oldest structures of its kind. However, the 18th century, more specifically the year 1740, is generally cited as the period of its construction. The stepwell is traditionally attributed to Rani Tanwarji, the wife of Raja Abhai Singh. This later dating is also more consistent with the architectural appearance of the structure. Neither date, however, is supported by inscriptions or documentary evidence. Ultimately, both dates could be possible, since, like other stepwells, the structure has undergone repeated restoration and modification over the centuries.

== Architecture ==
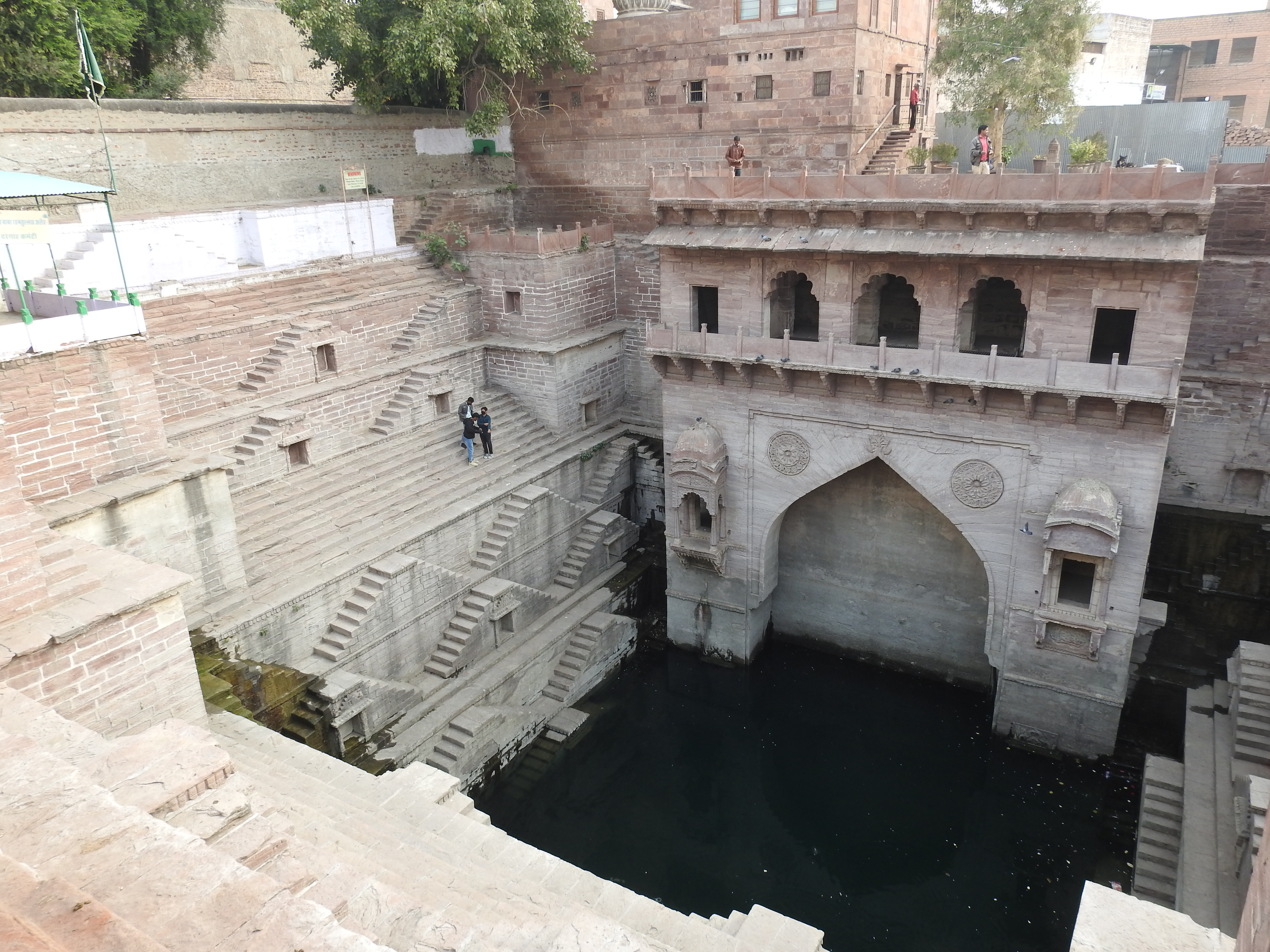
Turji Ka Jhalra, 2021

Turji Ka Jhalra, which is generally filled with water only during the monsoon season (June to September), is surrounded on three sides by prismatic flights of steps descending towards a water reservoir that is often dry in spring. The fourth side consists of a building featuring a large, slightly pointed arch with a blind arcade design, flanked on both sides by small projecting balconies (jharokhas). The well reaches its maximum water-holding capacity beneath a transverse balcony, behind which is an enclosed room accessible through doors.
