= Khas Mahal (Red Fort) =

Indian historical building

Coordinates: 28.656087°N 77.243579°E

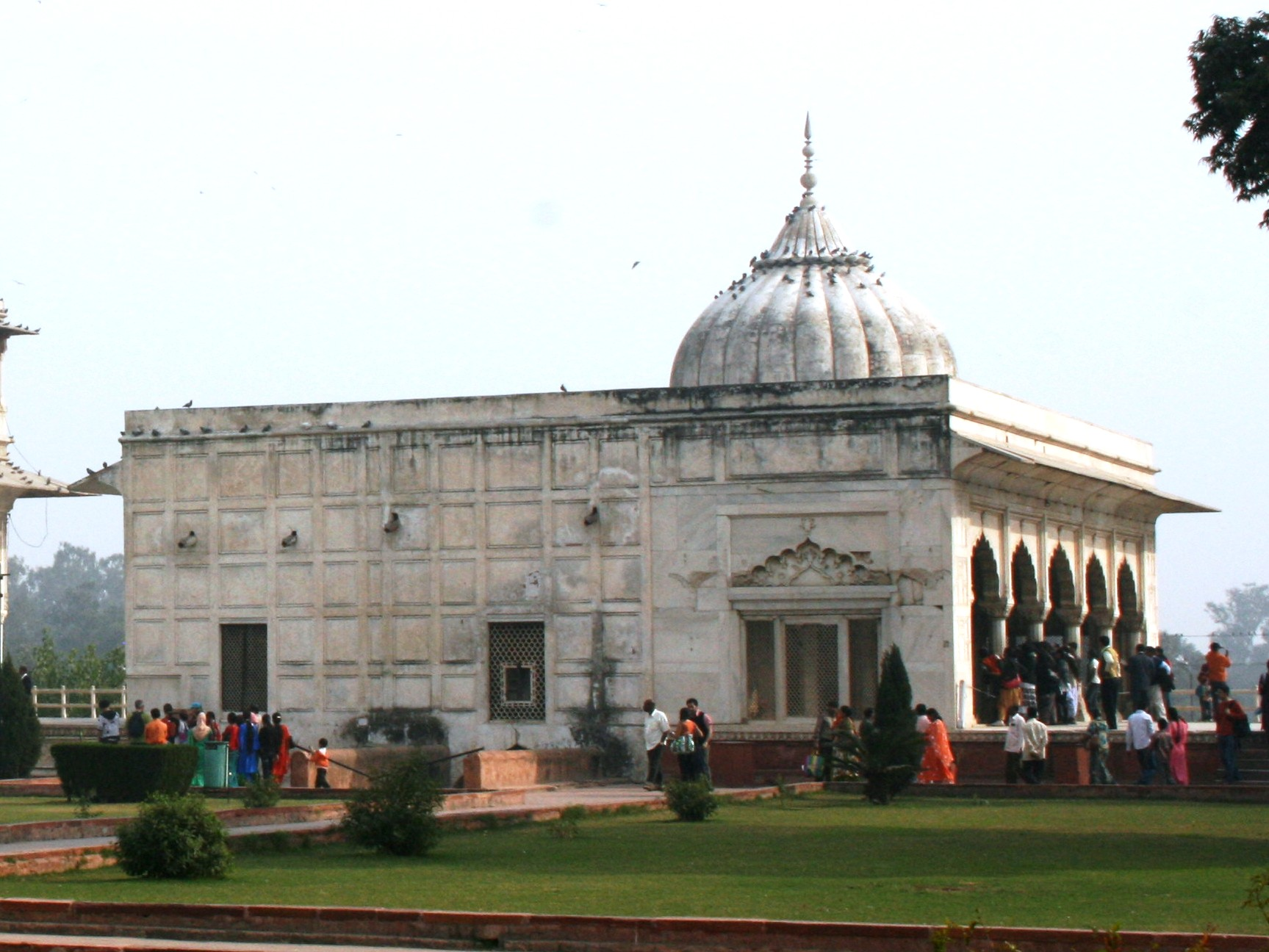
The Khas Mahal in the Red Fort

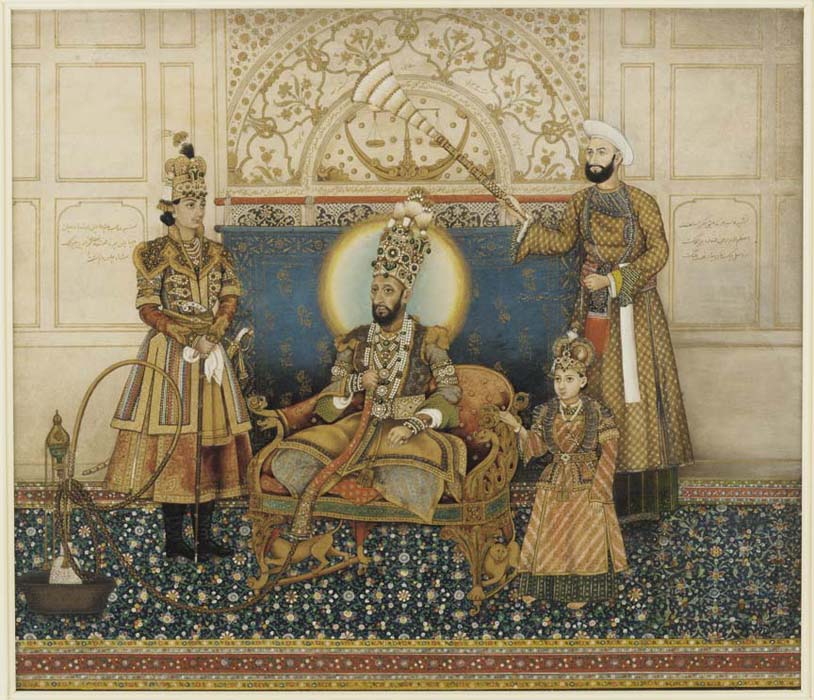
Bahadur Shah II enthroned underneath the Scale of Justice (1837–38)

The Khas Mahal served as the Mughal emperor's private residence in Old Delhi. The structure is located inside the Red Fort, which is a large defensive and governmental complex located inside the city. It consists of three parts: the Chamber of Telling Beads (Viz-tasbih-khana), the sleeping chamber, (khwabgah) and the wardrobe (tosha-khana) or sitting room (baithak). The interior is decorated with carved white marble painted with colourful floral decorations. The ceiling was also partially gilded. The marble screen was carved with the scale of justice (Mizan-i-adal), and above it is a particularly important item of Mughal art.

The scale used was a depiction of the emperor's justice. The projecting tower to the east of the Khas Mahal is called the Octagonal Tower (Muthamman Burj). The emperor would address his subjects every morning in a ceremony called Jharokha Darshan.

== History ==
The Khas Mahal, or "Private Palace," was constructed between 1639 and 1648 during the reign of Shah Jahan as part of his transformation of Delhi into the Mughal capital Shahjahanabad. Located within the Red Fort, the Khas Mahal formed the heart of the emperor’s private quarters, flanked by the Shah Burj, the Hammam (royal baths), and the Diwan-i-Khas (Hall of Private Audience). Following the 1857 uprising, British forces took control of the Red Fort and altered much of the palace's original fabric.

== Architecture ==
Functionally, the Khas Mahal served as the emperor's personal residence, yet its design embodied imperial ideology. The eastern-facing Muthamman Burj, a projecting octagonal balcony, allowed the emperor to perform Jharokha Darshan. It is a daily ritual of appearing before his subjects affirming his divine connection and just rule. A marble screen within the central chamber, known as the Mizan-i-Adl ("Scale of Justice"), reinforced this symbolism, positioning the emperor as both ruler and moral arbiter.

The palace’s integration with flowing water, river-facing views, and connected private spaces reflected the Persian notion of "stream of paradise", while its compact spatial plan adhered to the Mughal ideal of inward, layered royal privacy. The place with Marble screen where the water channel flowed was called "Large sitting place". It was also the architectural precursor to elements later seen in structures like the Khas Mahal of Agra Fort and mirrored the refinement of Shah Jahan's courtly tastes. After the fall of the Mughal Empire, the Khas Mahal underwent a period of neglect.

== Gallery ==
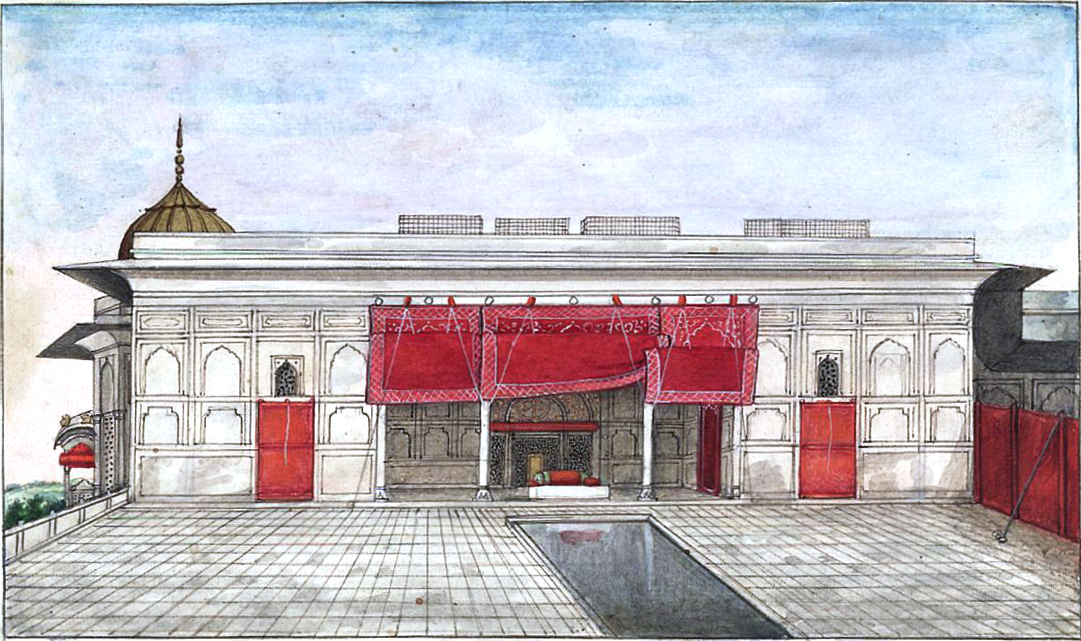
The Tusbeeh Khana with the imperial seat and the Stream of Paradise (1843)

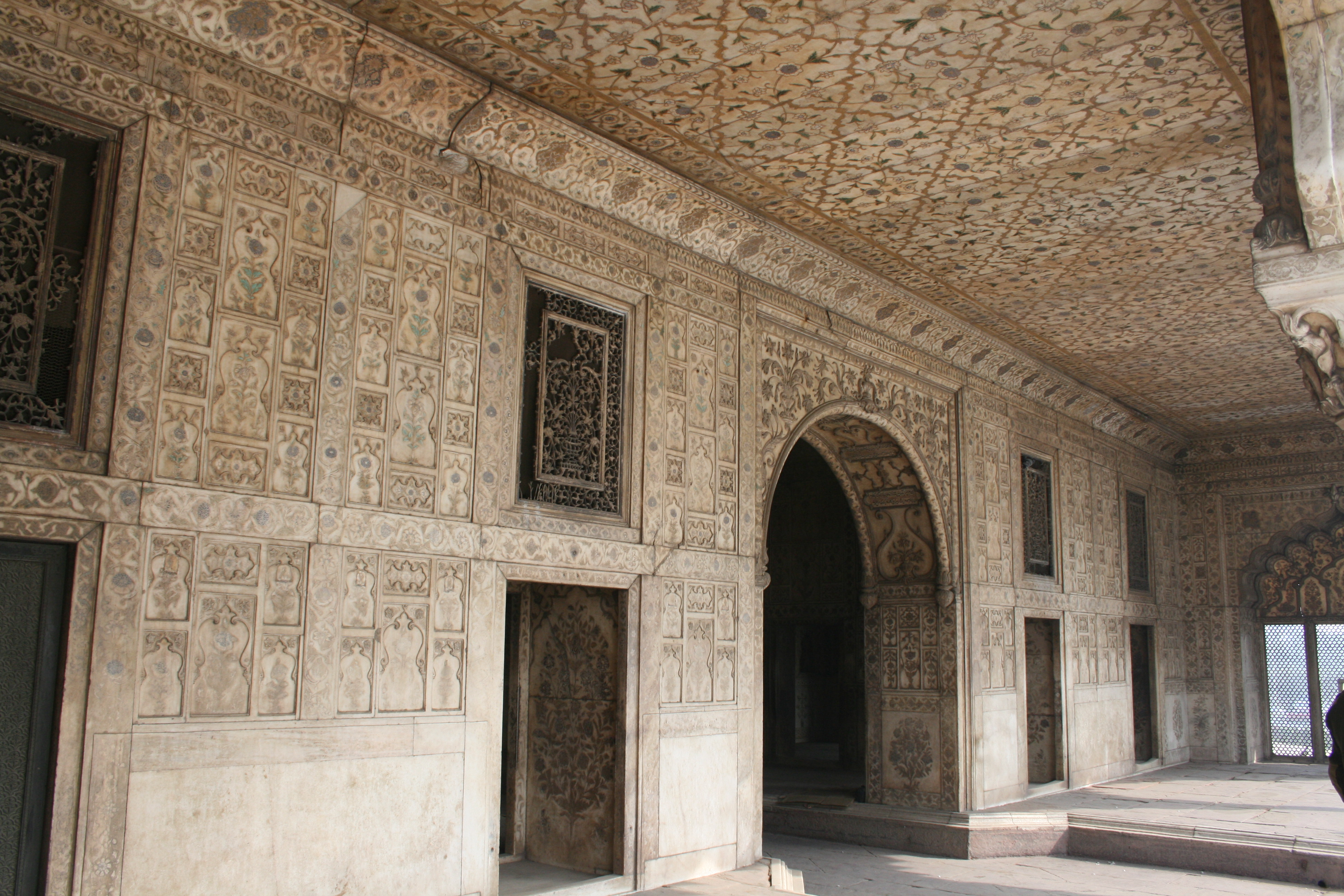
Interior with the Stream of Paradise

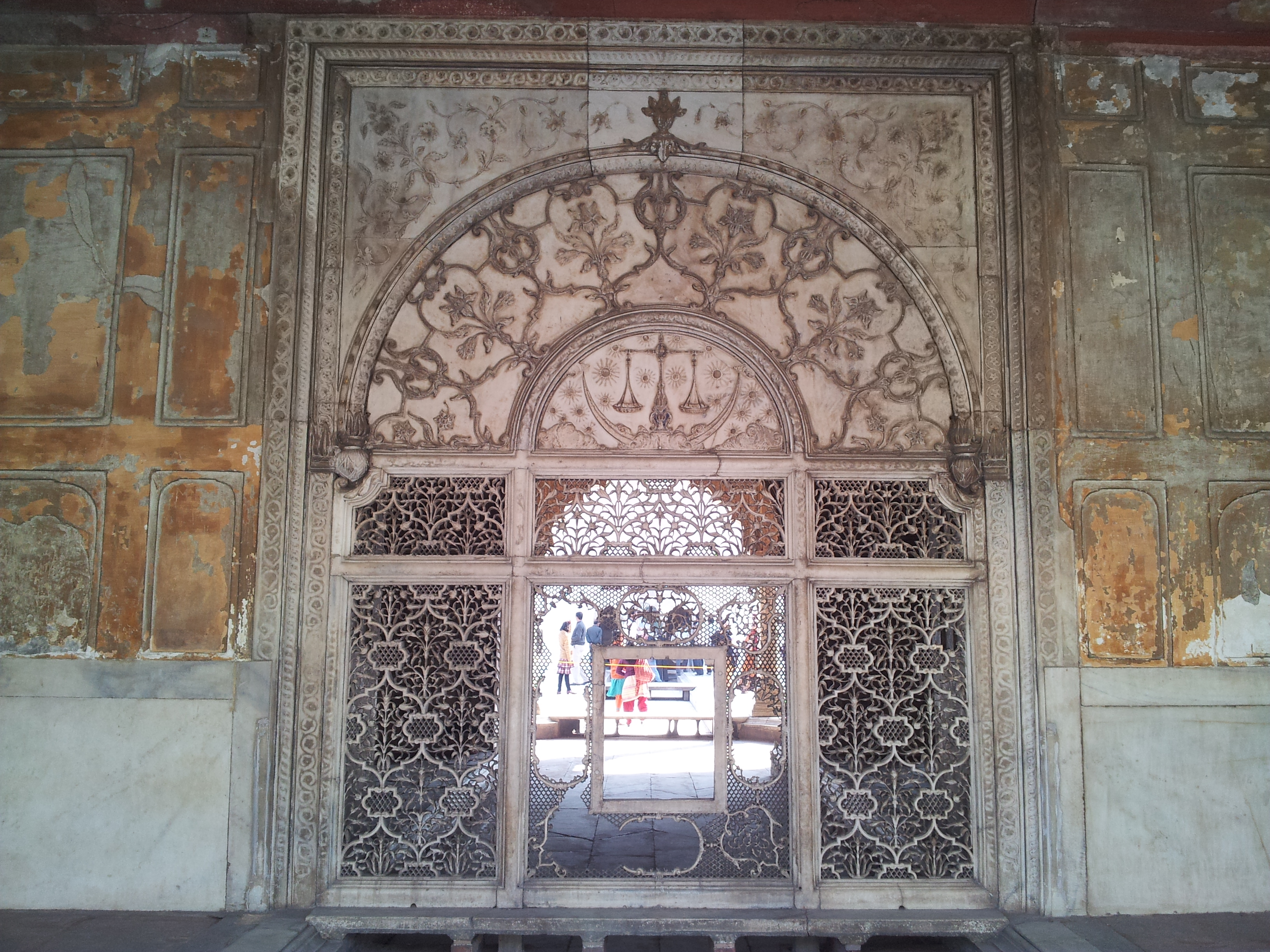
Marble screen with the scale of justice
