= Raja Bazaar =

Central area of Rawalpindi

Raja Bazaar راجہ بازار
- Shopping Hub
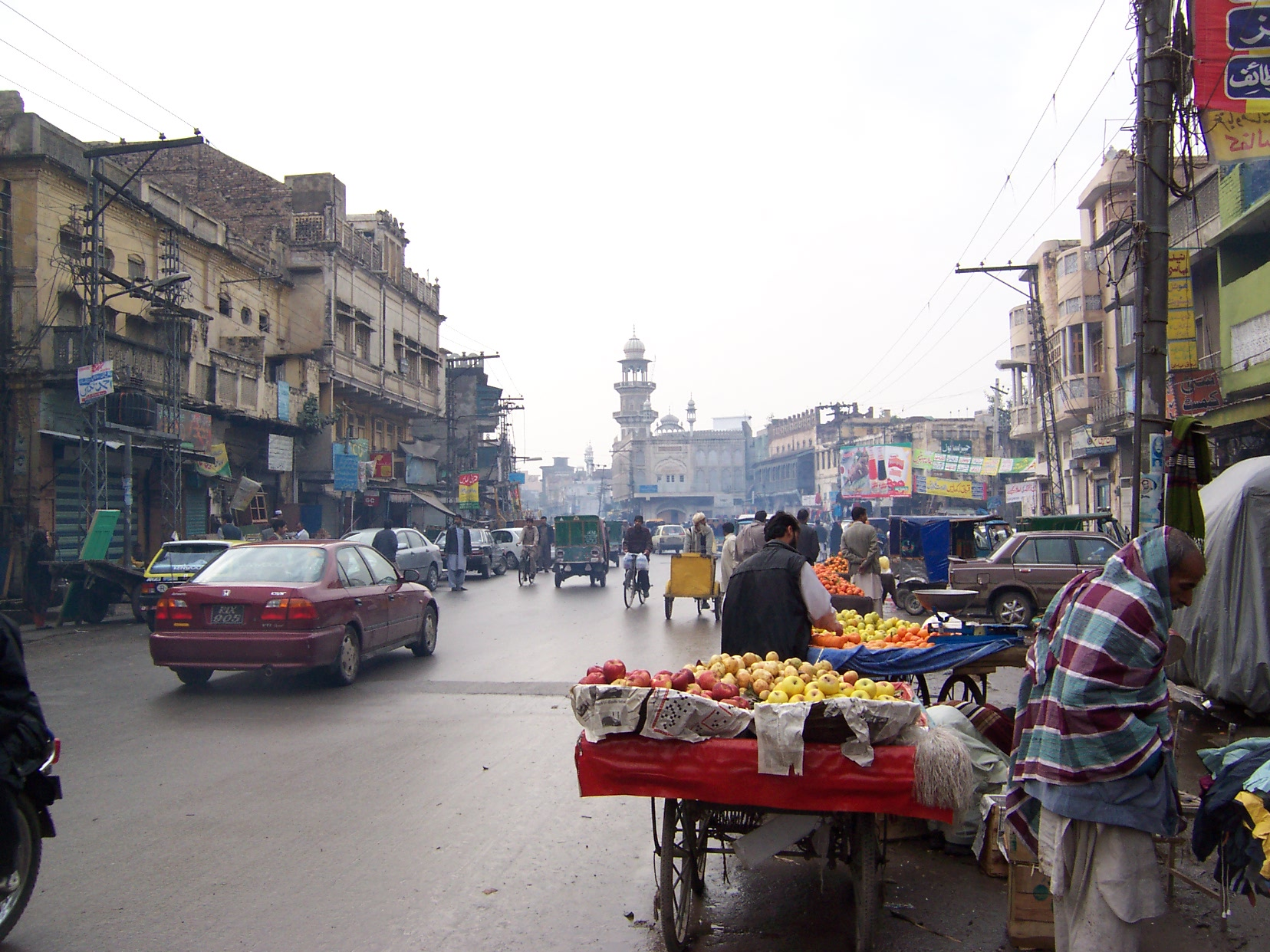
- Country: Pakistan
- Province: Punjab
- City: Rawalpindi

Languages
  - Official: Urdu
- Time zone: UTC+5:00 (PST)

Raja Bazaar (Urdu: راجہ بازار) is the primary commercial, residential hub, as well as the main shopping area and a union council of Rawalpindi.

Located near the Fawara Chowk, Raja Bazaar is commonly considered the heart of Rawalpindi city, it features key business and commercial centers, branches of major banks, and large residential areas dating back to the British colonial era. Several important roads converge at Raja Bazaar, including Trunk Bazaar, Liaquat Road, Moti Bazaar, Bhabra Bazar, Namak Mandi, and Narankari Bazaar.

== Historical background ==
The area is home to historic residential and commercial buildings from the British era, with narrow streets characteristic of its old architecture. Raja Bazaar encompasses a variety of smaller markets and bazaars, such as Kapra Bazaar, Lakkar Bazaar, Masala Bazaar, Sarafa Bazaar, Urdu Bazaar and Sabzi Mandi. Additionally, it houses an Rawalpindi Development Authority parking plaza at its centre for convenience. More than 2500 shops in Raja Bazaar are source of employment for thousands of workers.

"Raja Bazar hosts millions of customers locally and from Azad Kashmir, GB (Gilgit-Baltistan) and KP (Khyber Pakhtunkhwa) for being a 'one-stop market' providing multiple facilities of business, logistics, banking, currency exchangers, hotels, restaurants...

"Around 50% of shops have been converted into small plazas and joint markets after joining close by shops together making Raja Bazar the largest wholesale market of the city".

== Demographics ==
=== Social groups ===
Main ethnic groups in the area are Gujjar, Gakhar, Sheikh, and Janjua.

== District Headquarters Hospital ==
District Headquarters Hospital Rawalpindi, affiliated with Rawalpindi Medical College provides basic health care to the residents of inner and old city and also serves a referral centre for trauma patients.

== Roadside vendors ==
Raja Bazaar has several commodities such as used books, metal and plastic buckets, ropes, soap cases, hair bands, bangles, bags, and other accessories are available from roadside vendors. These roadside small shops are the major attraction of Raja Bazaar. At the end of the week, the pavements on either side of which the shops are located in Raja Bazaar are crowded by Juma Bazaar.

"Since old ages, it still serves as the central business hub of the city by accommodating thousands of wholesalers and retailer shops with diverse range of household grocery to fruits, vegetables, jewelry, clothes, cooking utensils, electronic appliances and much more".

== Raja Bazaar beautification project ==
In February 2025, Rawalpindi Municipal Corporation, Rawalpindi District Administration along with Parks and Horticulture Authority (PHA) have announced a three-phase plan to beautify Raja Bazaar.

- In the first phase, to reduce traffic congestion, all the Suzuki vans and rickshaws will not be allowed to stop at Fawara Chowk.
- In the second phase, traffic police will control the traffic congestion.
- In the third phase, all electricity, telephone and cable lines will be moved underground.

Then a pedestrian street will be opened from Fawara Chowk to Hamilton Road (Dingi Khoi).
