= Narankari Bazaar =

Narankari Bazaar نرنکاری بازار
- Bazaar
- Country: Pakistan
- Province: Punjab
- City: Rawalpindi

Narankari Bazaar (Urdu: نرنکاری بازار) is a bazaar located in Rawalpindi. It is one of the oldest bazaars linked with the main Raja Bazaar in front of Sabzi Mandi and behind Namak Mandi and Ganj Mandi. The nearest police station is GANJ MANDI Police Station. It comprises more than 1000 shops selling a variety of goods including food, dried fruit, candies and chocolates, stationery, cosmetics, and daily use products with local and imported packaging.

== History ==
The bazaar is named for the Narankari ethnic group of Sikh people.

Nirankaris are those who believe in a formless God. Nirankaris emphasize that God is omnipresent but has no form.

A namesake Gurdwara Nirankari Gurdwara is also there.
