= Jharokha =

Indian architectural element

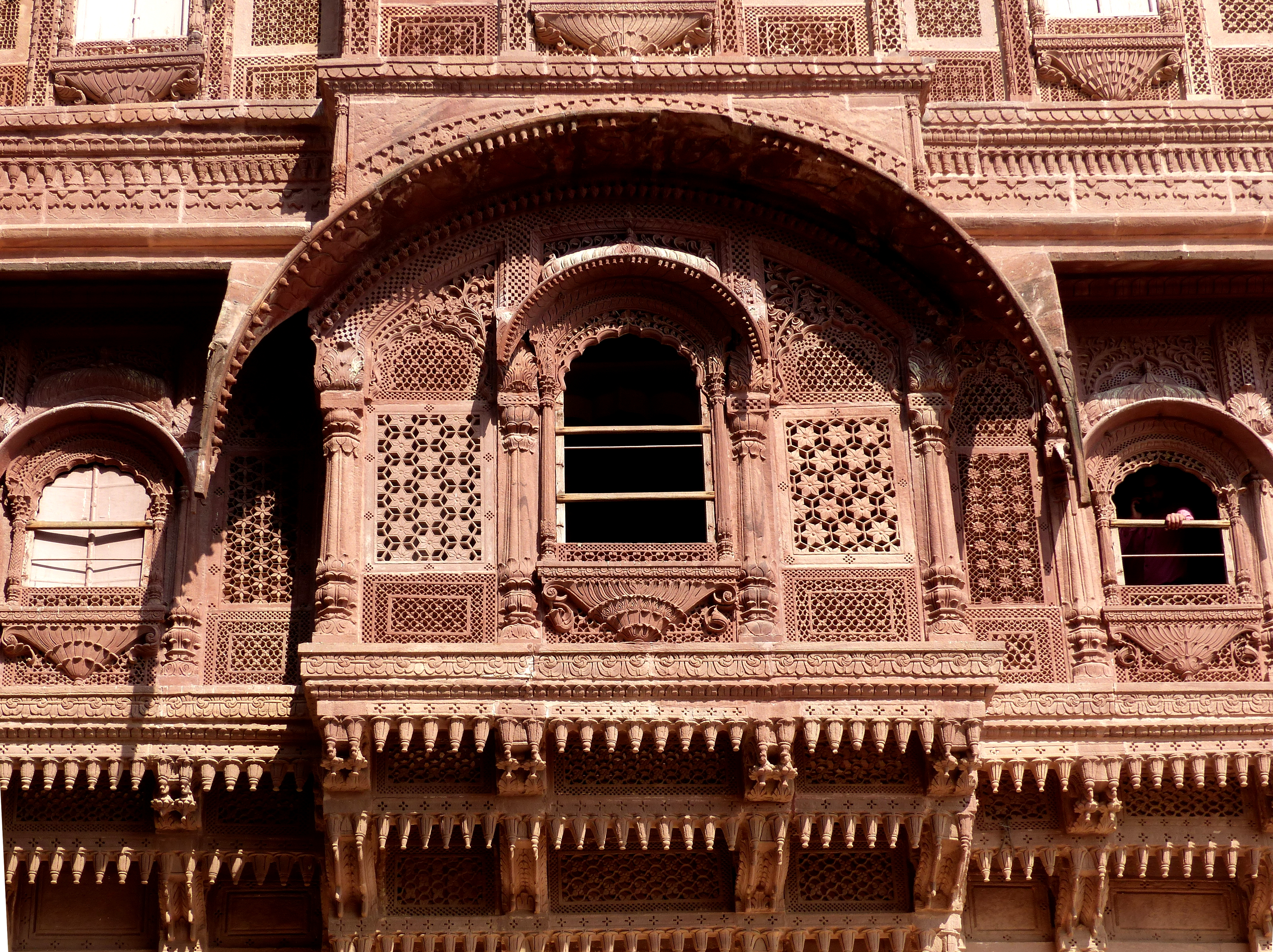
Jharokha balcony in Jodhpur (Mehrangarh) Jharokha

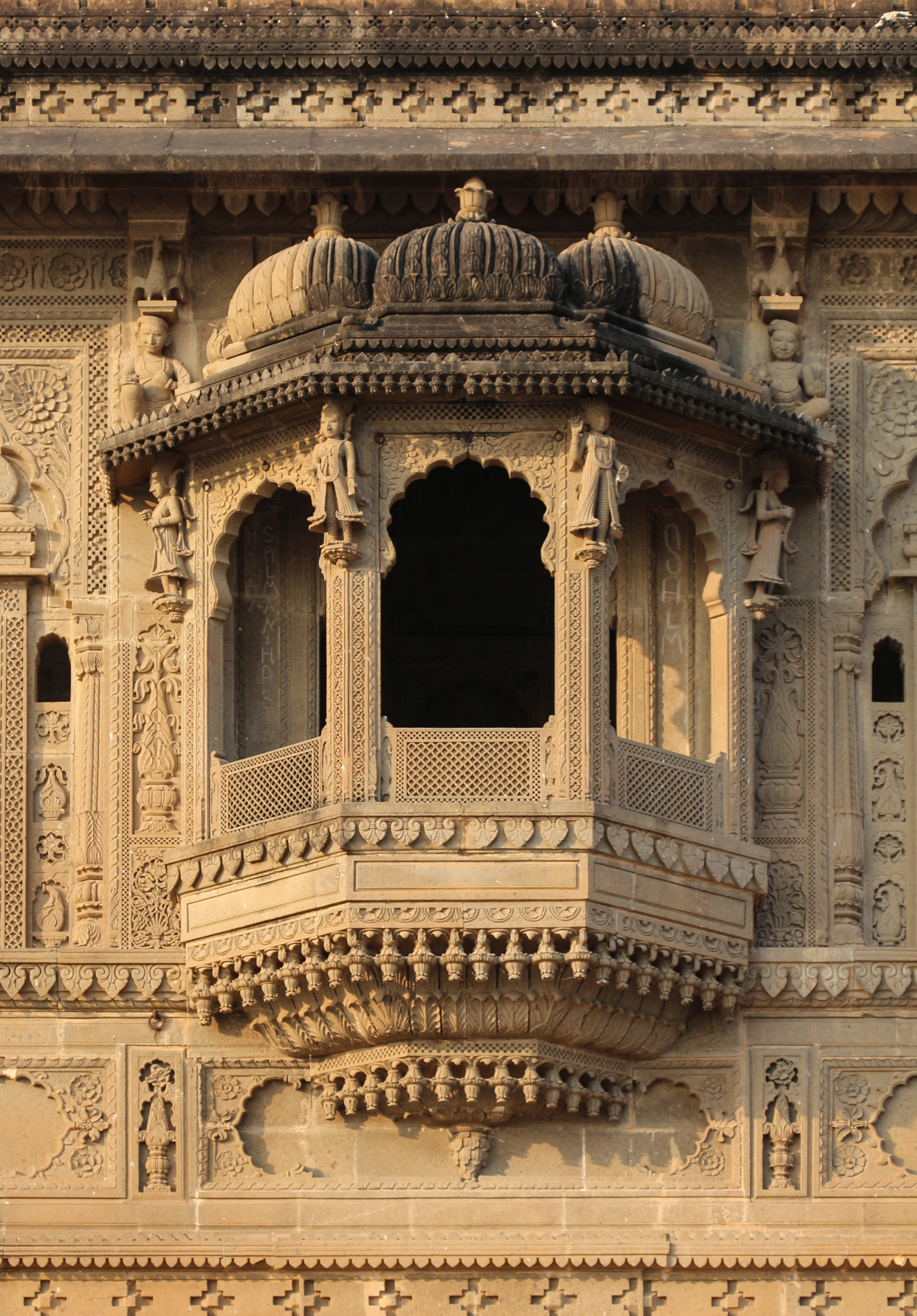
A jharokha in Maheshwar Fort, Madhya Pradesh

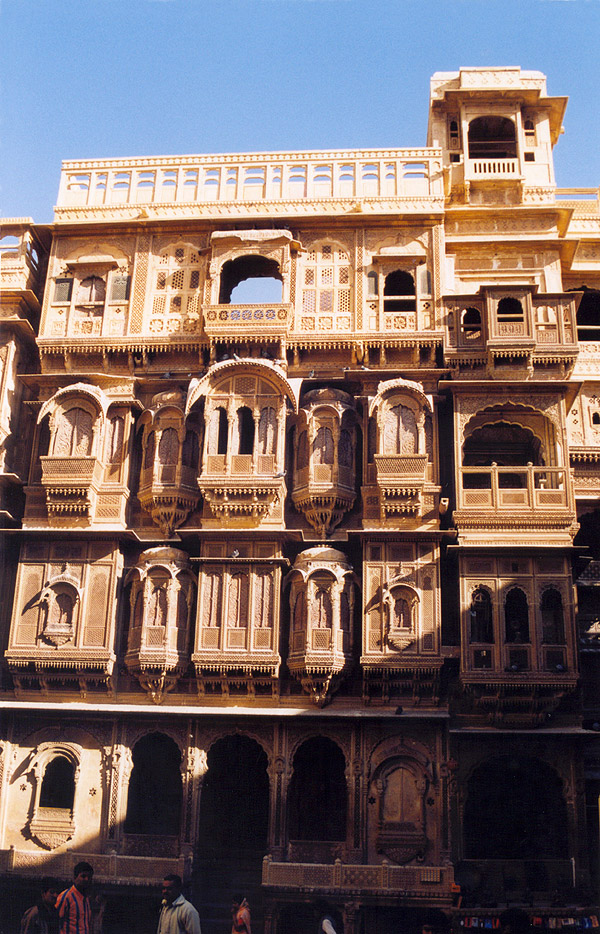
Several jharokha can be seen jutting out from the facade of this typical haveli at Jaisalmer, Rajasthan

The jharoka is a stone window projecting from the outer wall of an upper story building. It usually overlooks a street, market, court or any other space. It is a common feature in classical Indian architecture, most prominently seen in Rajput architecture. It is supported by two or more brackets or corbelling, and includes two pillars, balustrade and a cupola or pyramidal roof. Although it is technically closed by a jali, it is generally partly open for people to view public events. The jharokha is more formal and ornamental than the English or French oriel window, and is one of the most distinctive characteristics of the façade in medieval Rajput architecture until the 19th century.

== Background ==
Early examples of jharokhas appear in pre‑Rajput buildings as primitive oriel windows for light and air. During the 16th-18th centuries, under Rajput and Mughal architectural influence, they became elaborate architectural trademarks. Initially serving purely utilitarian functions, jharokhas gradually adopted decorative carvings, latticework and chhatri style domes, and were used for royal audiences (jharokha dārshana) and discreet observation under purdah.

The jharokha darshan of rulers was a structure for displaying the ruler to his court or people rather than allowing inhabitants of the palace to look out unseen. It was therefore more open, and not necessarily built projecting out from its wall.

== Architectural features ==
Jharokhas typically protrude from the main wall on ornately carved corbels or brackets, creating a small chamber or balcony. Their three‑sided enclosures are filled with delicate jaali lattice screens of stone, wood or alabaster; bearing geometric, floral and religious motifs. Many terminate in small domes or chhatris and feature scalloped or cusped arches borrowed from Mughal designs. Deep overhanging chhajjas (eyebrow sun‑shades) and continuous horizontal "speedlines" accentuate their profile while providing shade. Materials range from locally quarried sandstone and Makrana marble in royal structures to wood in smaller dwellings, and their placement on facades facing courts or processional routes optimizes views and natural ventilation.

Creating a jharokha involved selecting suitable materials, conceptualizing designs rich in local symbolism, and executing intricate carvings by traditional artisans (suthars). After carving, the prefabricated elements were assembled on site, adjusted for stability, and finished often with polishing or gilding to enhance their visual impact.

== Cultural significance ==
Beyond their functional roles, jharokhas symbolized princely power and prestige, acting as stages where rulers addressed subjects and as secluded vantage points for royal women. Their carved motifs lotus, peacock, swastika and epic scenes reinforced religious and social values, while the latticework moderated interior climate, adapting buildings to Rajasthan’s hot environment. Notable examples of jharokhas abound across Rajasthan’s architectural heritage. In Jaipur, the Hawa Mahal or "Palace of Winds" features 953 small jharokhas arranged in a honeycomb pattern to cool the interior and allow royal women to observe street festivals unobstructed. Udaipur's City Palace boasts a series of richly carved sandstone balconies that overlook the serene waters of Lake Pichola. Jaisalmer’s Patwon Ki Haveli displays a profusion of geometric and figurative latticework on its projecting windows, while Bikaner's Junagarh Fort incorporates red sandstone jharokhas that extend over its inner courtyards. At Chittorgarh Fort, strategically placed jharokhas served as surveillance points, offering panoramic views of the surrounding plains.

== See also ==
- Matroneum
- Bay window
- Mashrabiya
