= Muthamman Burj (Red Fort) =

Tower of the Agra Fort in Agra

Coordinates: 28.656085°N 77.243705°E

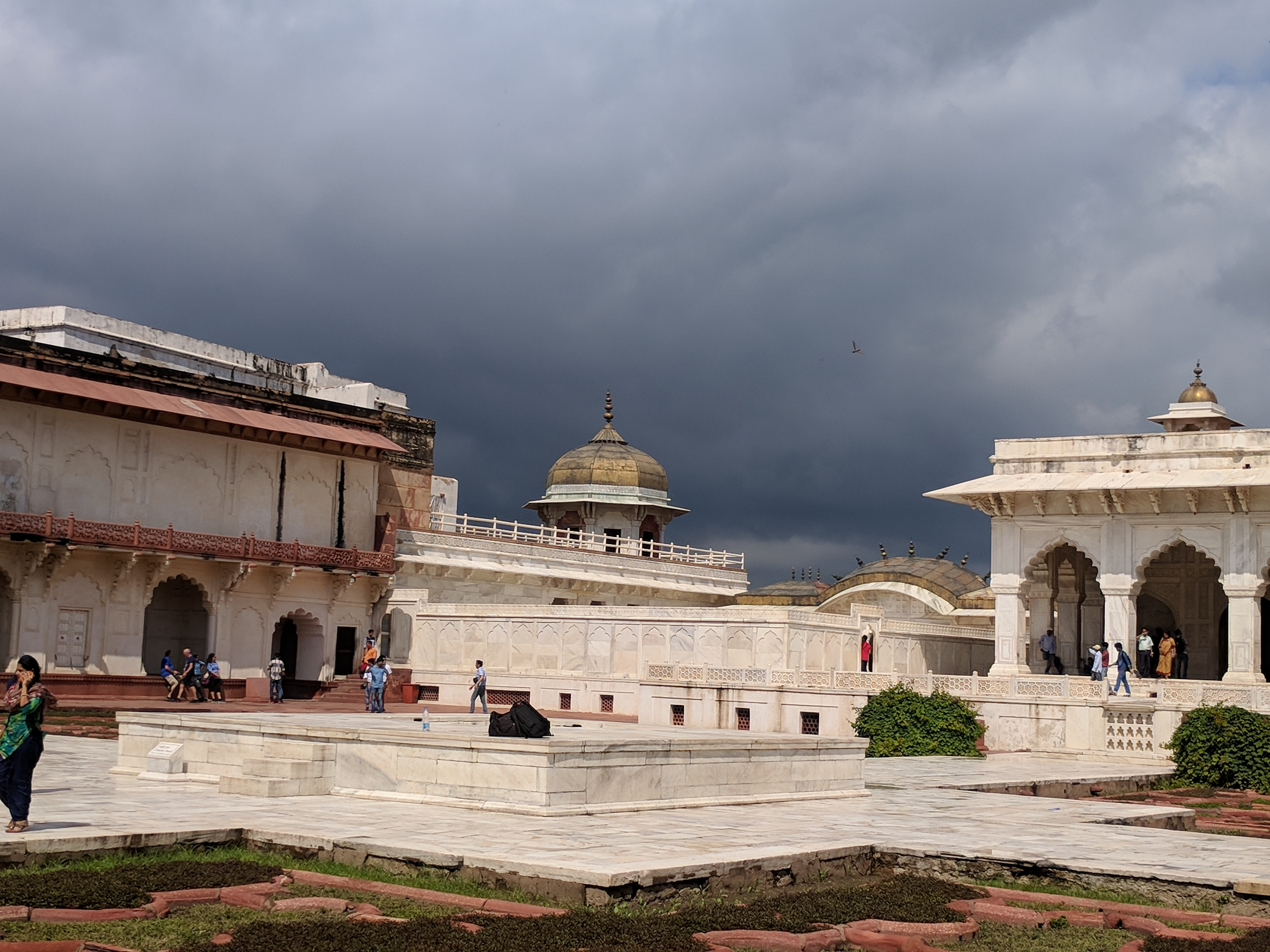
Muthamman Burj (center) in the Agra Fort

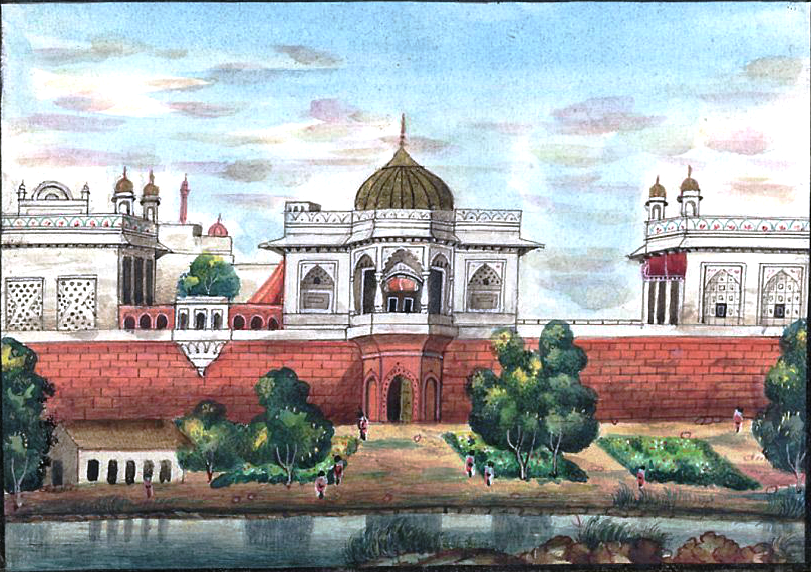
The Muthamman Burj in the centre of the eastern wall of the Red Fort (painting from 1843)

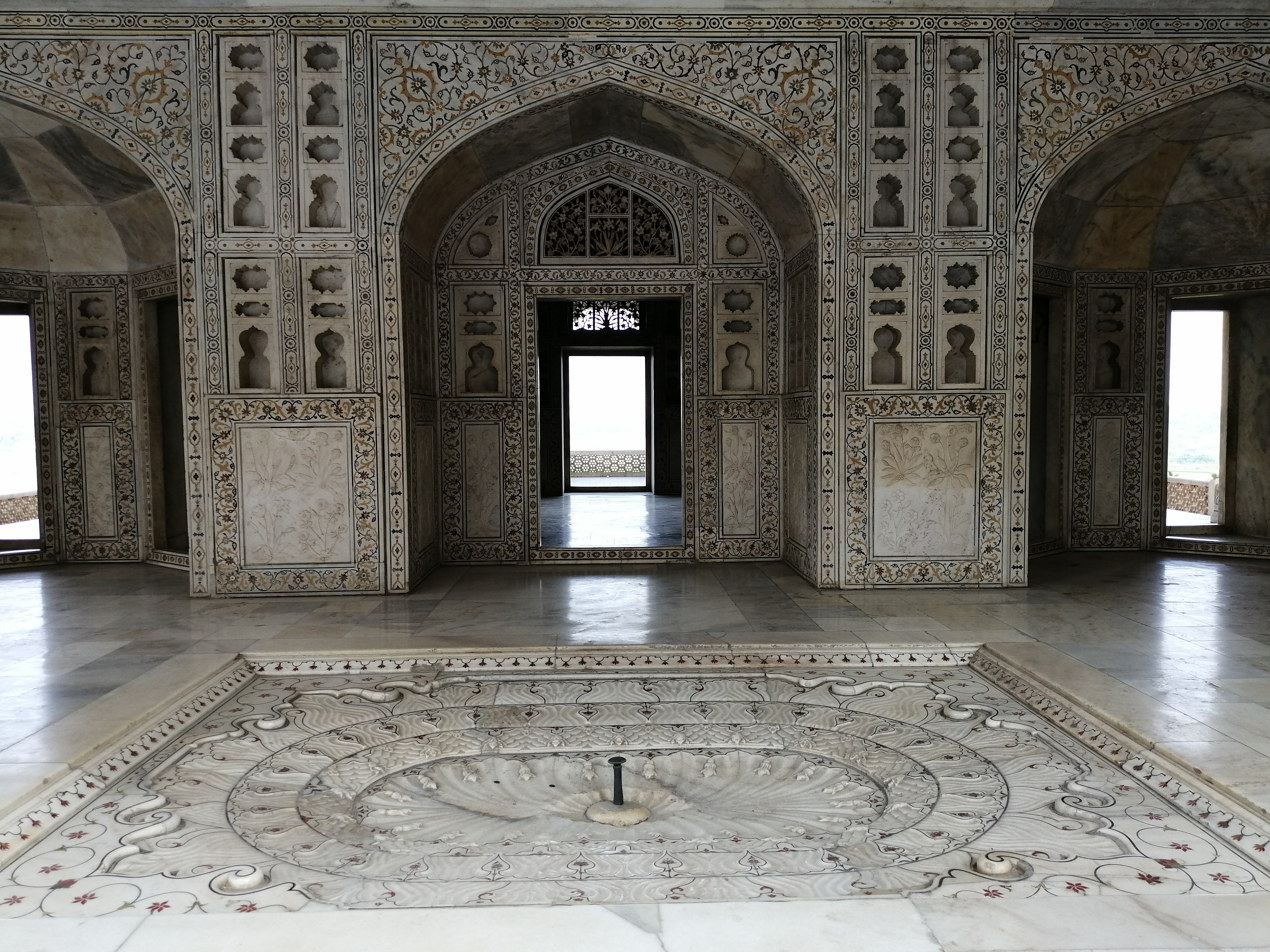
Interior of the Muthamman Burj

The Muthamman Burj, also written Musamman Burj, is a palace and tower of the Red Fort located in Old Delhi.

The structure adjoins the eastern wall of the Khwabgah of the Khas Mahal. It is a semi-octagonal tower where the Mughal emperor would appear every morning before his subjects. This ceremony was known as the Jharokha Darshan. A balcony, the Khwabgah Jharoka (Place of Dreams Balcony), projecting from the central side of the tower was constructed in 1808-09 CE by Akbar II. This is described in an inscription over its arches. The dome above was perhaps originally covered in gilded copper, similar to the one in Agra Fort.

This beautiful palace surmounts the largest bastion of Agra Fort on the riverside, facing the East. It was originally built of red stone by Akbar who used it for jharokha darshan, as well as for sun worship, every day at sunrise.

The river Yamuna originally laid much closer to the wall and tower but shifted its position since the original construction. At the lower level of the tower is a small gate, which enabled the emperor to move directly between the imperial enclosure of the fort and the banks of the river, where the royal barges would take him to Agra.

During the British colonial rule, the tower was used again for the great Durbar. It was from this balcony that King George V and Queen Mary appeared before the public in 1911 during the Delhi Durbar.
