= Musamman Burj (Agra Fort) =

Tower in the Agra Fort complex

Coordinates: 27°10′44.04″N 78°1′24.96″E

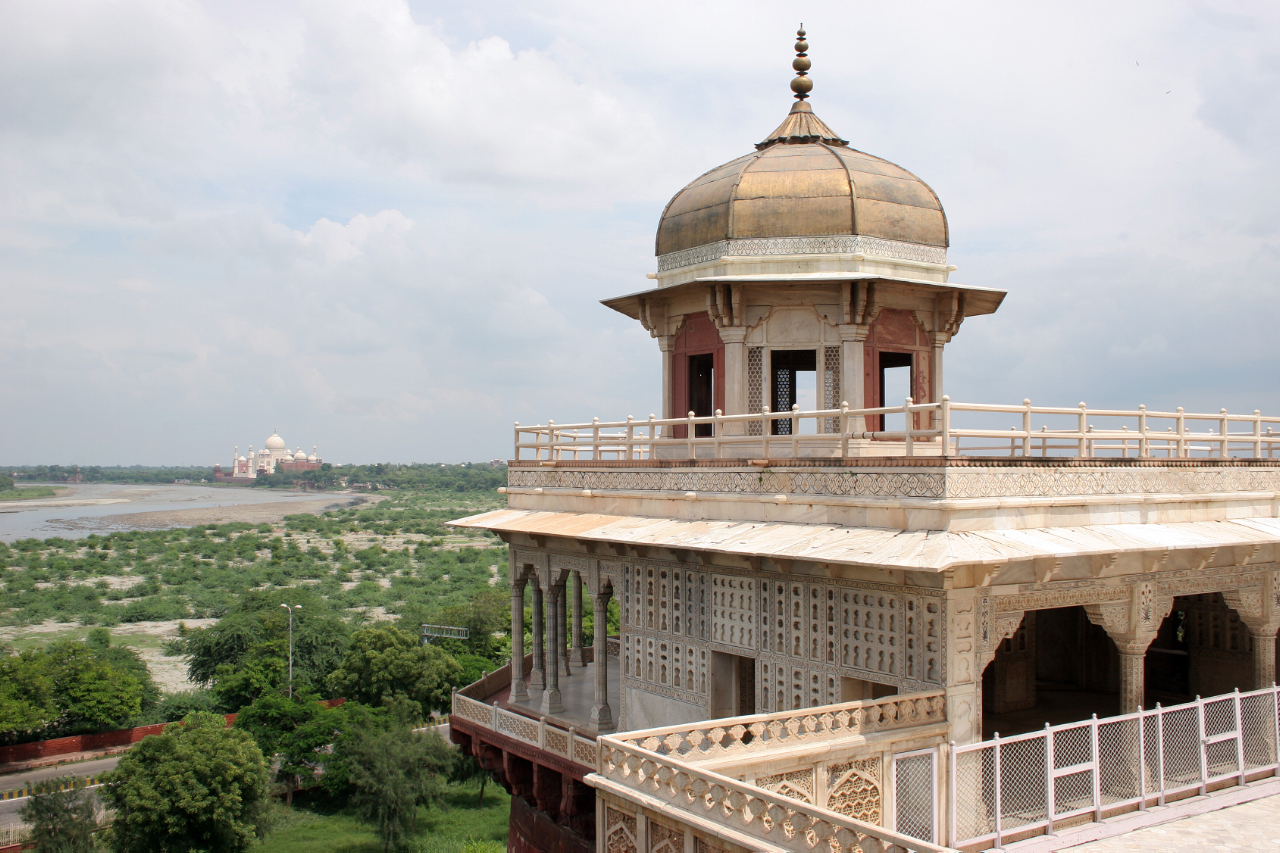
View of Musamman Burj from northwest, with the Yamuna river and the Taj Mahal

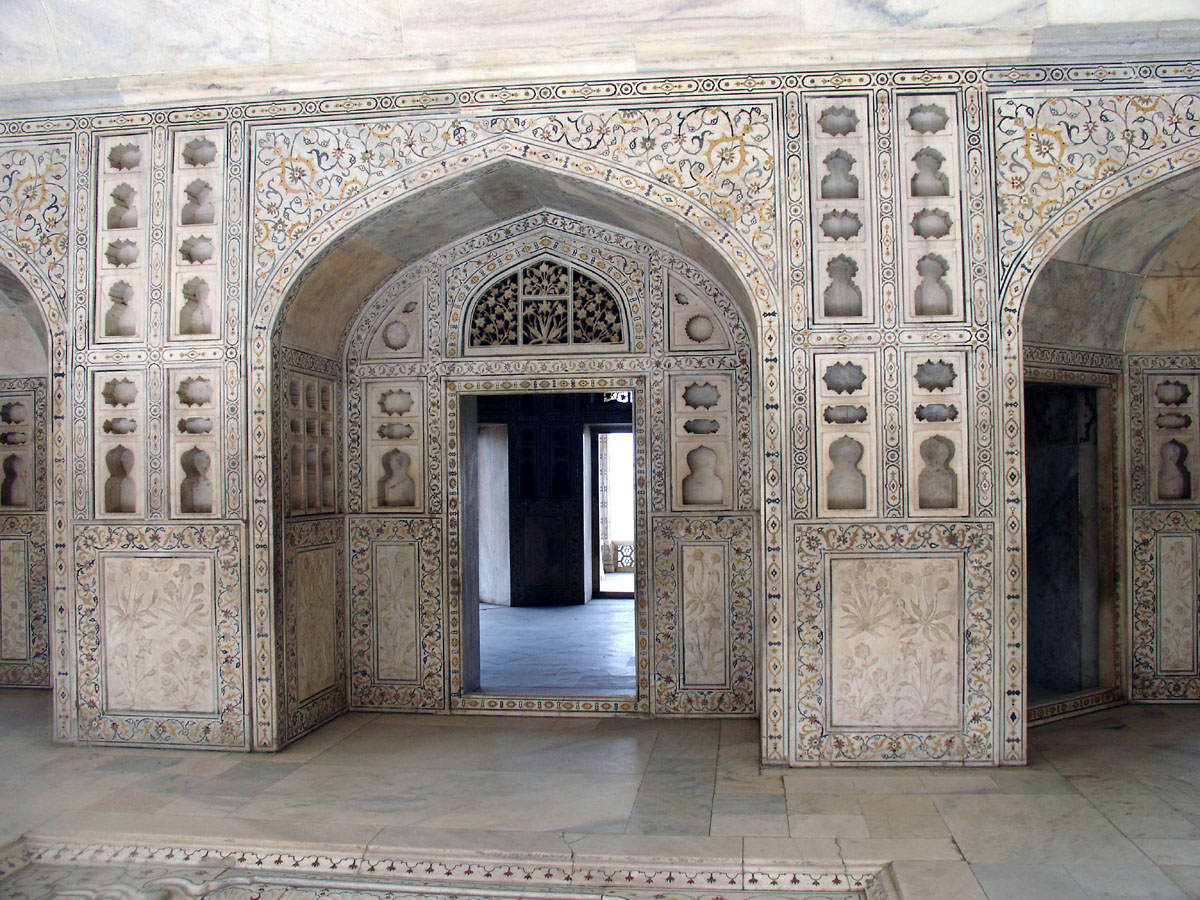
Interior of the Musamman Burj

Musamman Burj also known as the Saman Burj or the Shah-burj, is an octagonal tower standing close to the Shah Jahan's private hall Diwan-e-Khas in Agra Fort.

== History ==
Musamman Burj was built by Shah Jahan for his beloved wife Mumtaz Mahal. It is said that at first a small marble palace built by Akbar was situated at this site, which was later demolished by Jehangir to erect new buildings. Shah Jahan in his turn chose this site to erect the multi-storied marble tower inlaid with precious stones for Mumtaz Mahal. It was built between 1631 and 1640 and offers exotic views of the famous Taj Mahal.

== Architecture ==
The Musamman Burj is made of delicate marble lattices with ornamental niches so that the ladies of the court could gaze out unseen. The decoration of the walls is pietra dura. The chamber has a marble dome on top and is surrounded by a verandah with a beautiful carved fountain in the center.

The tower looks out over the River Yamuna and is traditionally considered to have one of the most poignant views of the Taj Mahal. It is here that Shah Jahan along with his favorite daughter Jahanara Begum had spent his last few years as a captive of his son Aurangzeb. He lay here on his death bed while gazing at the Taj Mahal in Agra.

== Gallery ==
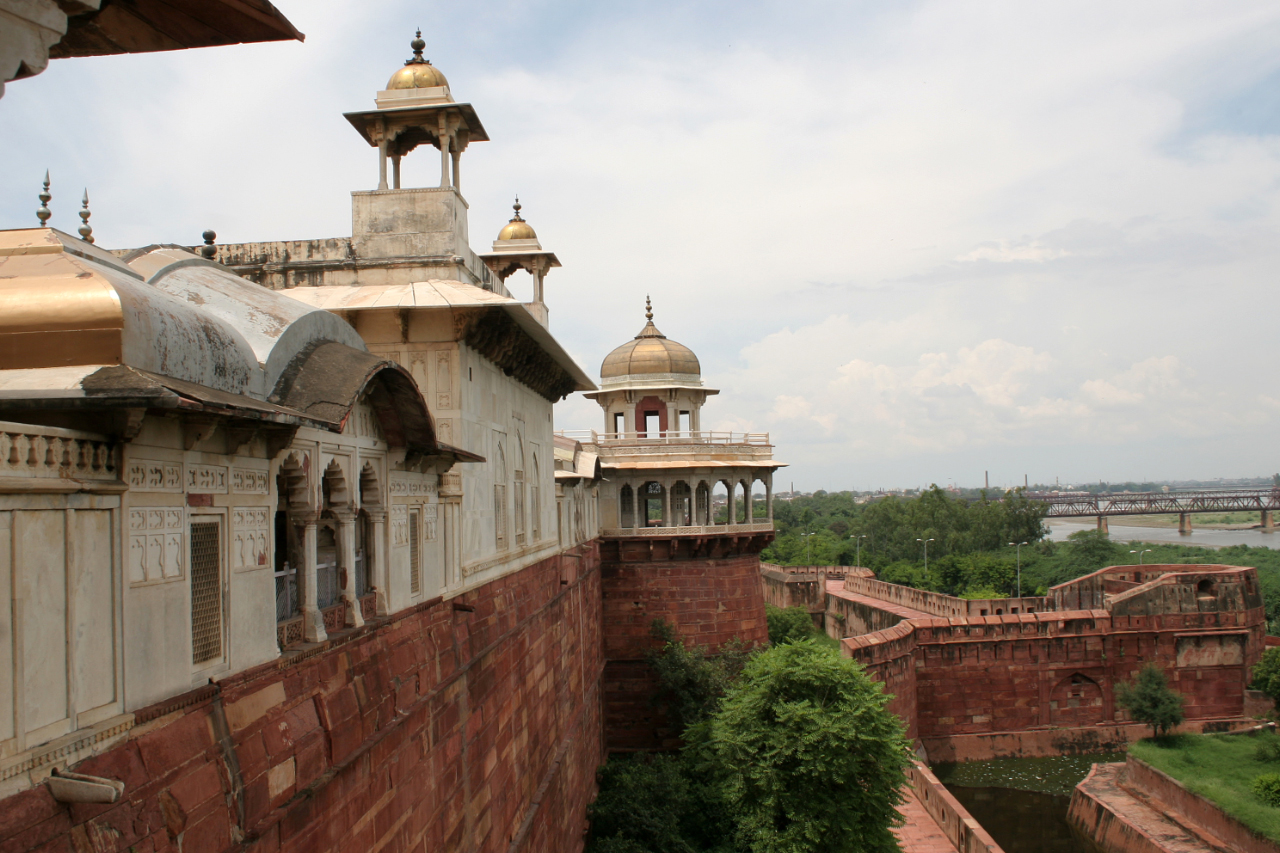
View from South

ornamented pillar

interior ornamentation

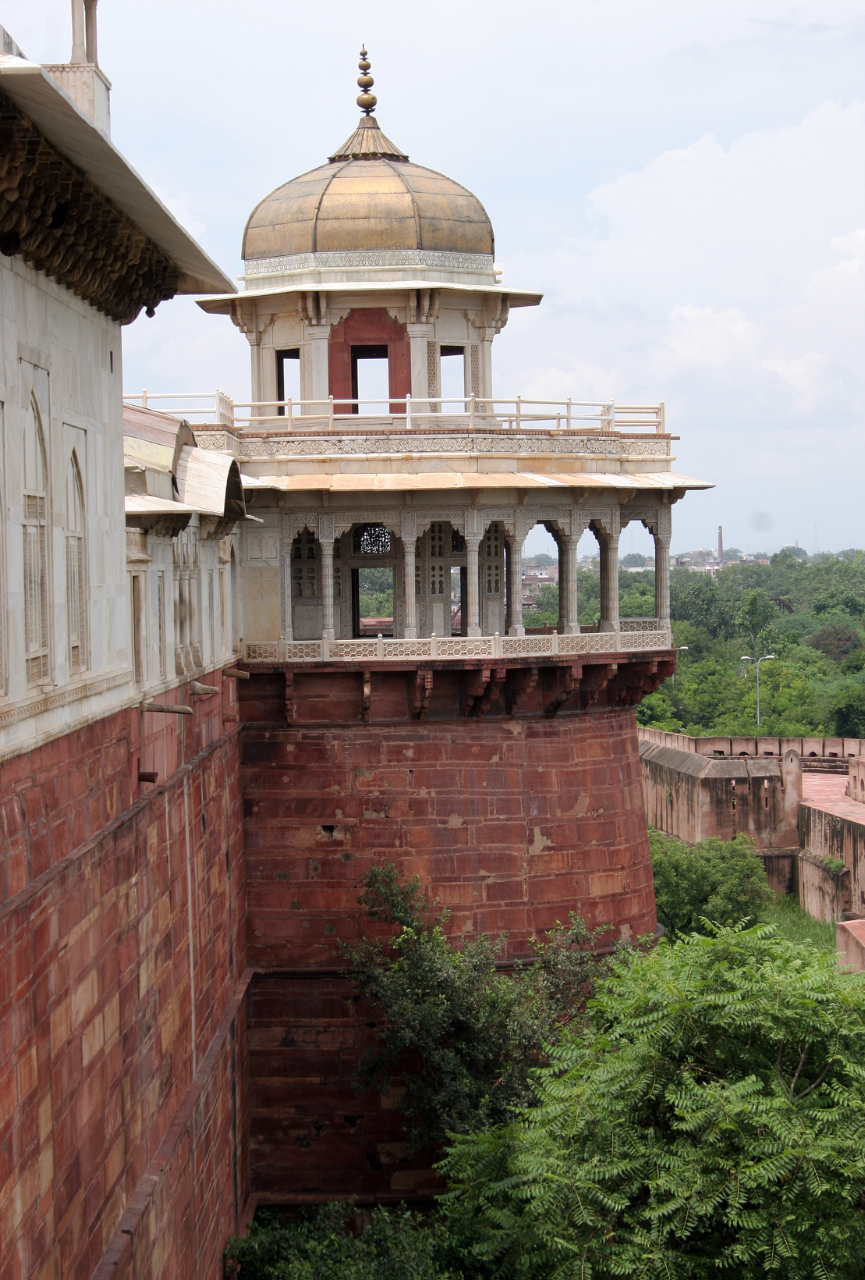
Closer view from South

decorative ornamentation

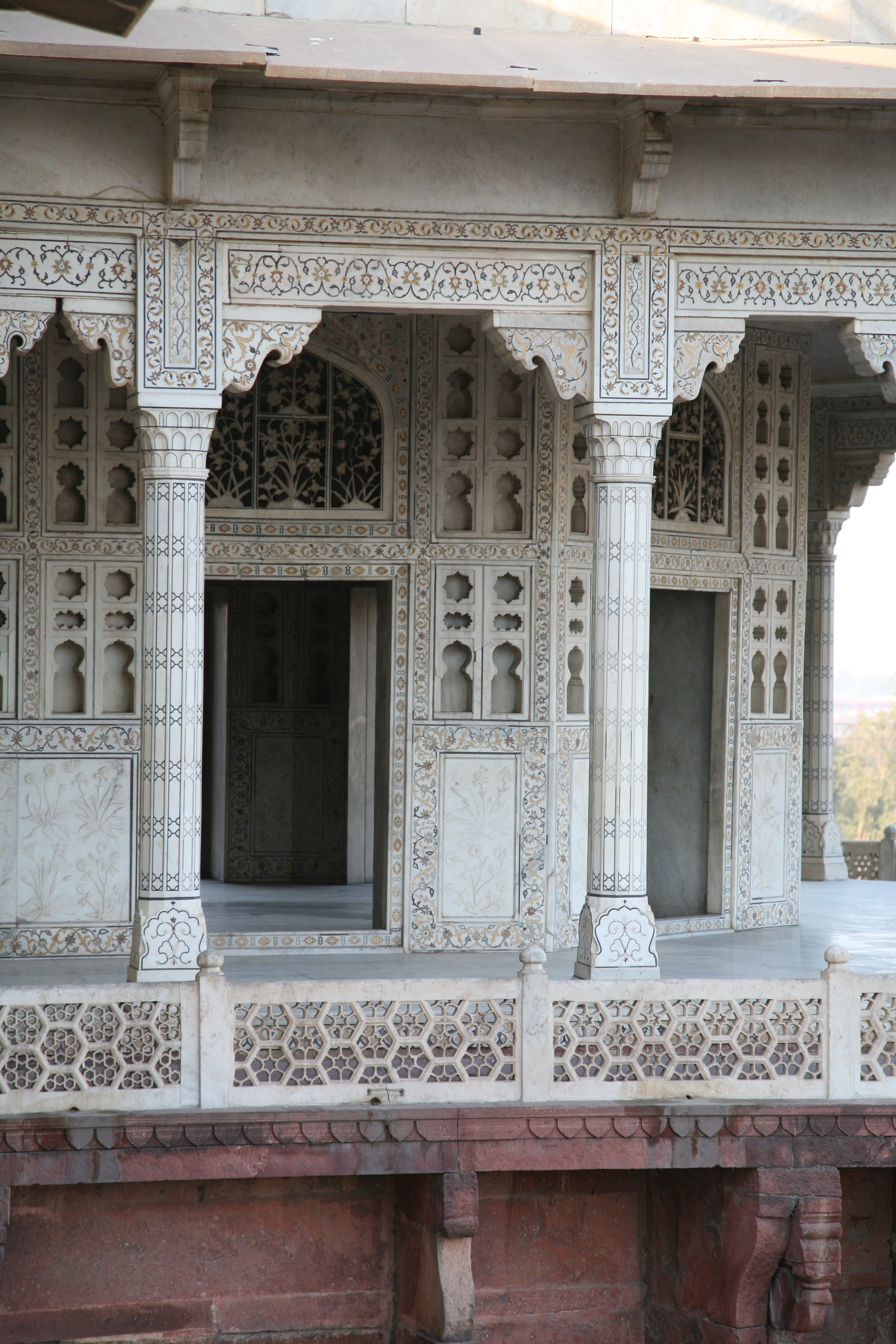
Detail of the verandah

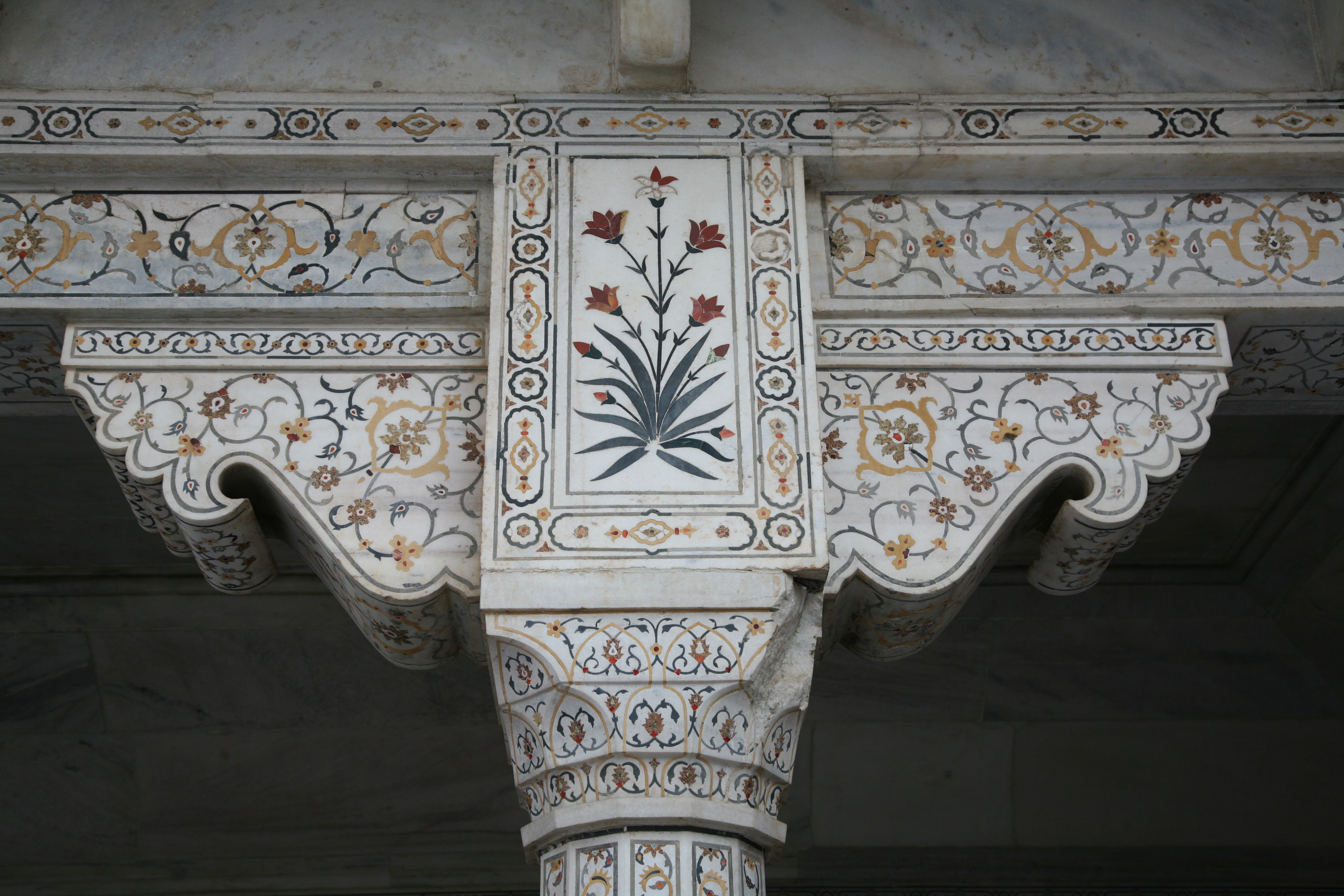
Detail of the interior decoration

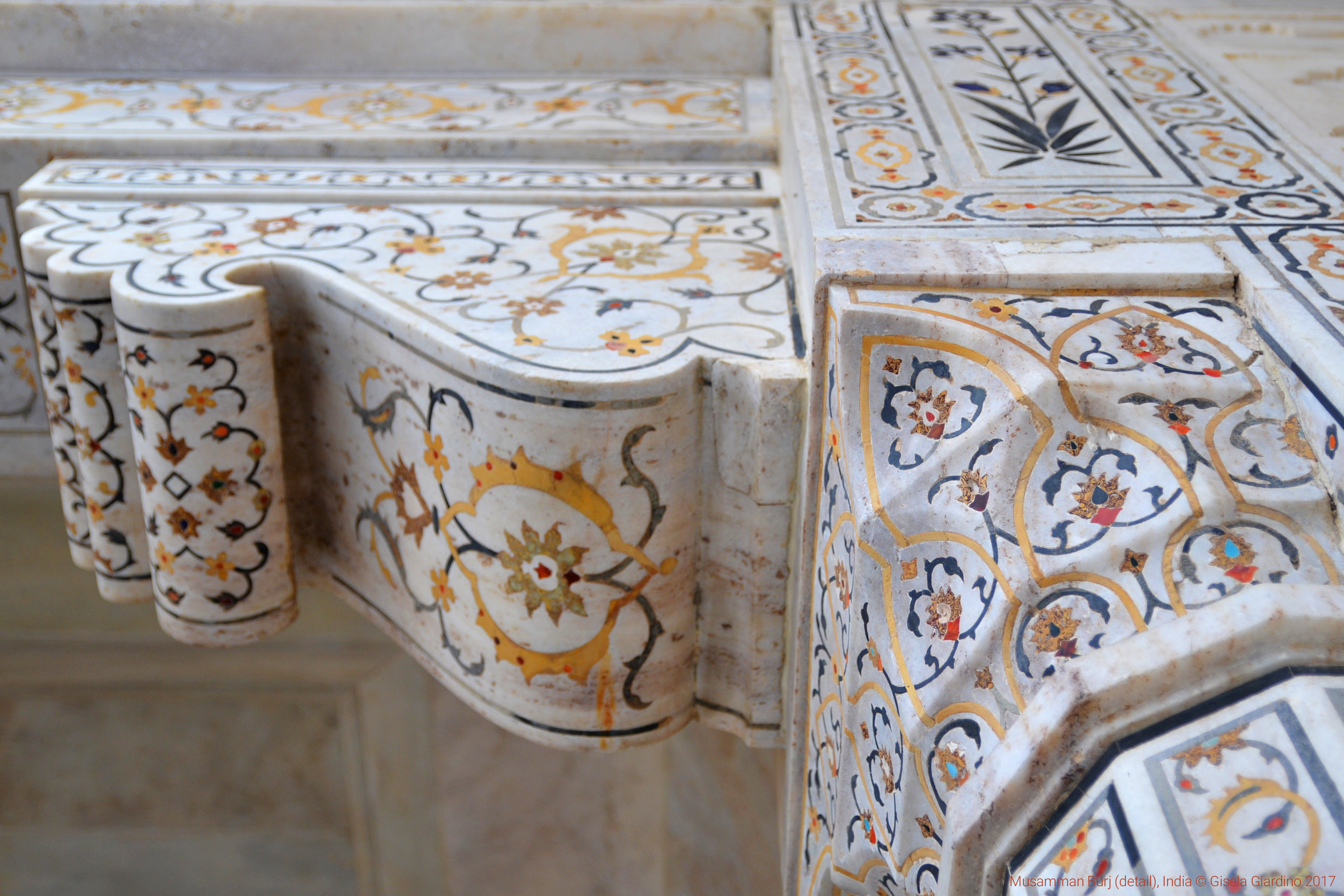
Details of interior decoration

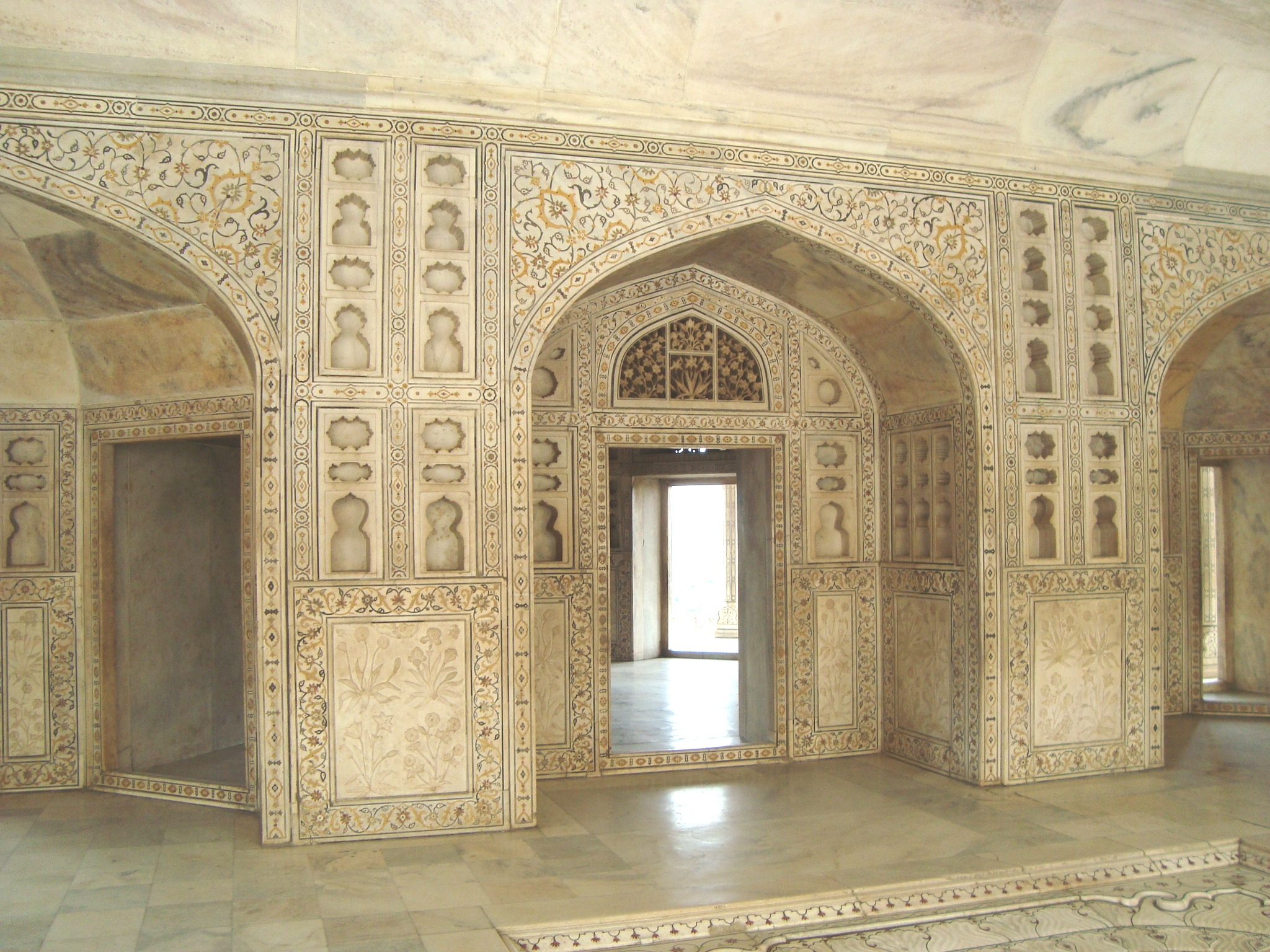
Interior

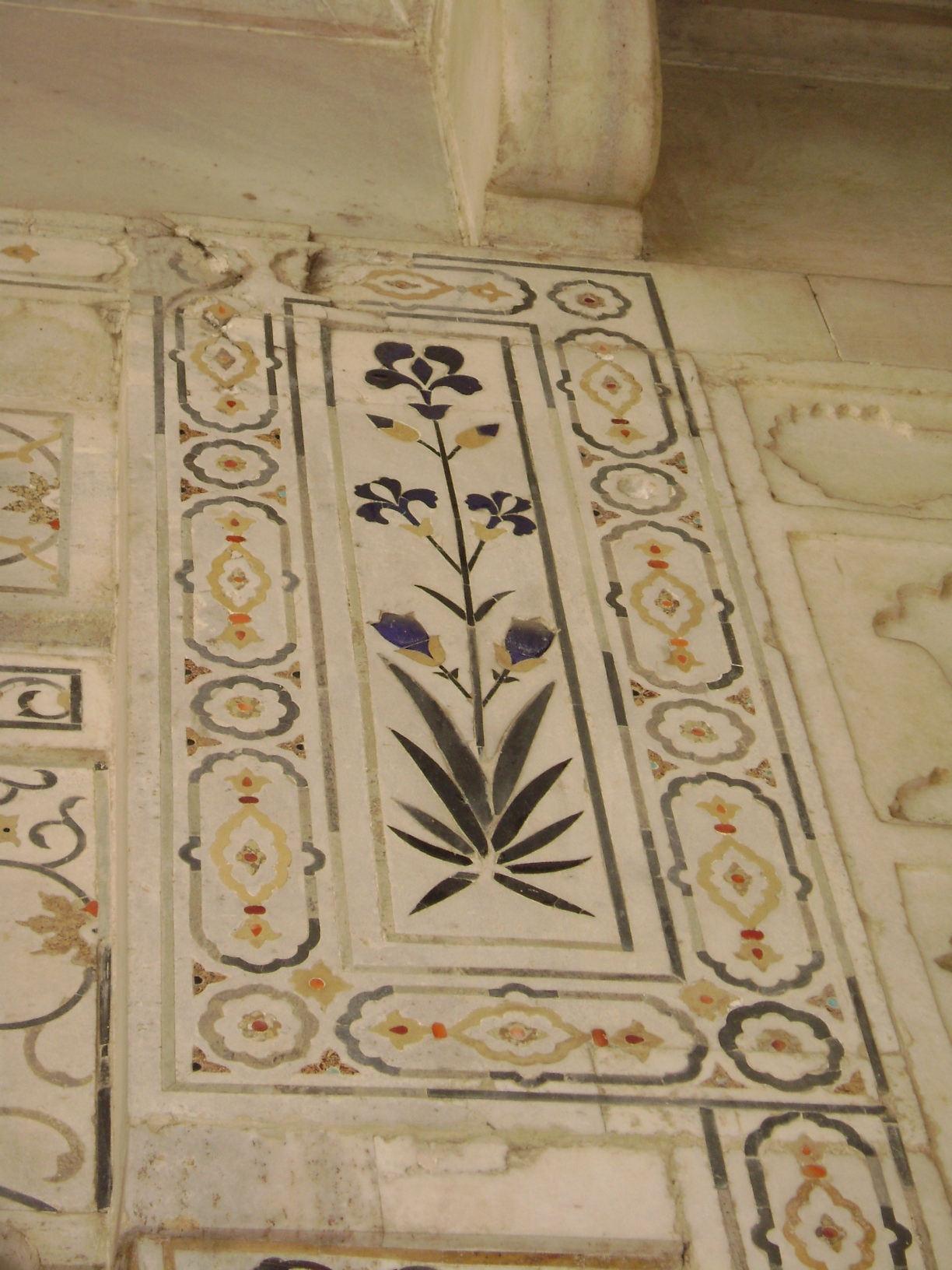
Decorations on the wall of Musamman Burj

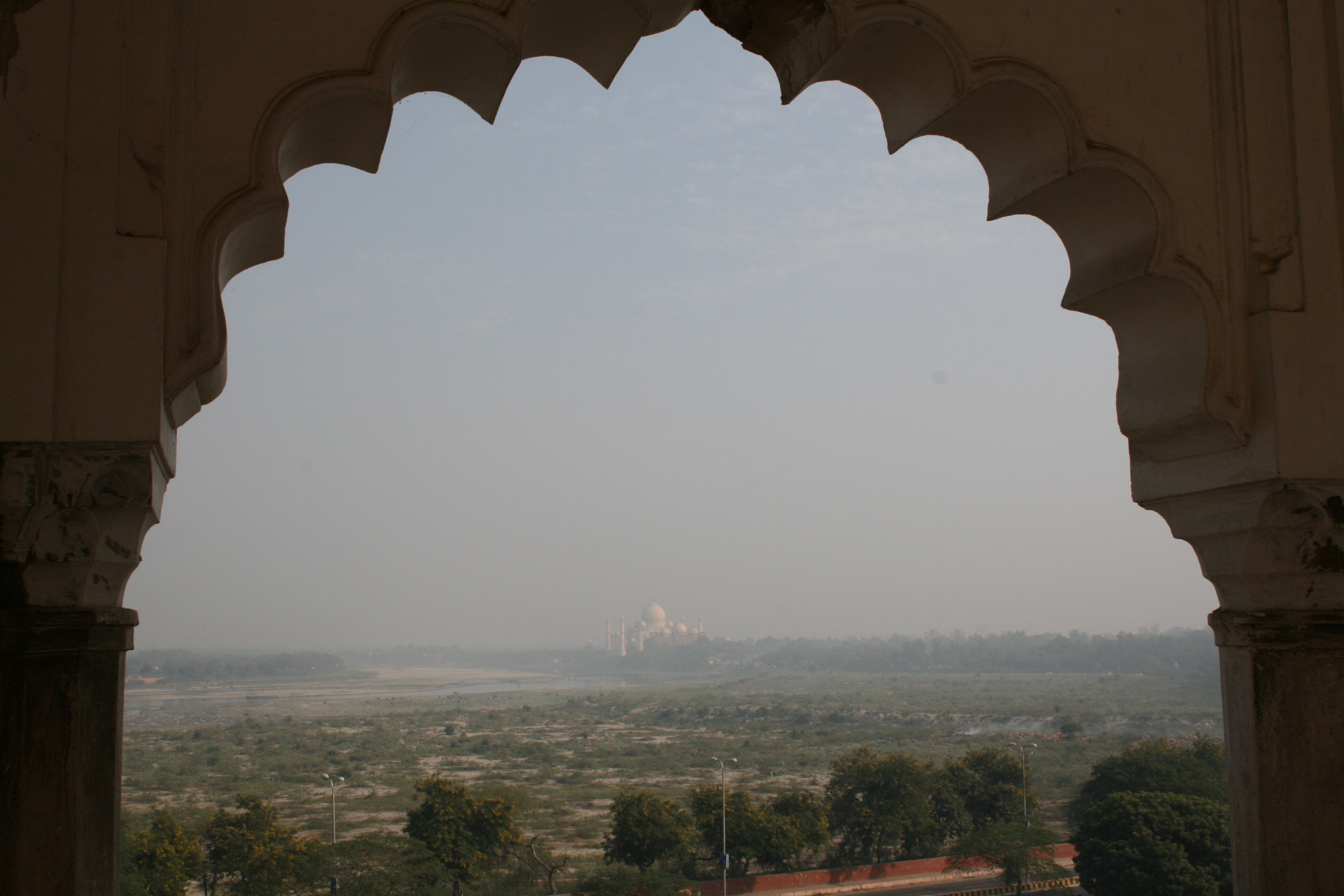
Taj Mahal from Musamman burj

Musamman Burj interior pillar

== See also ==
- Shah Jahani Mahal
- Moti Masjid
