= Kalyan Das Jain =

Indian politician

Shri Kalyan Das Jain was an independent politician from Agra, Uttar Pradesh, India. He served as mayor of the city for five consecutive terms from 1963 to 1969.
