= Neku Siyar =

De facto Mughal emperor

Nikusiyar نیکوسیر
- Shahzada of the Mughal Empire; Mughal pretender Mirza
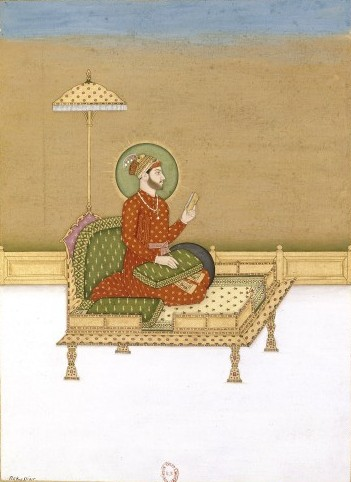
- Timur II

Mughal pretender
- Pretence: 18 May 1719 – 13 August 1719
- Predecessor: Rafi ud-Darajat

Subahdar of Assam
- Reign: c. 1695 – 1701

Subahdar of Sindh
- Reign: c. 1702 – 1707
- Born: Mirza Muhammad Nikusiyar before 6 October 1679; Mughal Empire
- Died: 12 April 1723; Salimgarh Fort, Delhi
- Burial: Mausoleum of Qutb-ud-Din Kaki, Delhi
Names
- Mirza Muhammad Nekusiyar Timur II ibn Mirza Muhammad Akbar
Regnal name
- Timur II
- House: Mughal dynasty
- Dynasty: Timurid dynasty
- Father: Muhammad Akbar
- Mother: Salima Banu Begum
- Religion: Sunni Islam (Hanafi)

Mirza Muhammad Nikusiyar or Nekusiyar or Neku Siyar, also known as Timur II, was a claimant to the Mughal throne.

Neku Siyar was born in 1679, the son of Mughal prince Muhammad Akbar, and a grandson of emperor Aurangzeb. He was brought up in a harem in Agra.

In 1695, at the age of 16, he was appointed the subahdar of Assam by Aurangzeb and served until 1701. In 1702, he was then appointed the subahdar of Sindh, serving until 1707.

== Pretender to the throne ==
On May 1719, Birbal, the local governor of the Agra Fort, used Neku Siyar as a puppet and proclaimed him as the emperor. Neku Siyar was brought out of old harem prison on 18 May 1719 and proclaimed the Mughal emperor, challenging the legitimacy of the reign of his nephew Rafi ud-Darajat.

The Sayyid brothers acted quickly to secure the position of their puppet emperor, retaking the Agra Fort by June and deposing Birbal and Neku Siyar from their posts. Neku Siyar was arrested on 13 August 1719 and again placed in his old harem prison at Agra. He was then imprisoned in the Salimgarh Fort in Delhi.

Neku Siyar died on 12 April 1723 in Persia, at the age of 43.

== Ancestry ==
Ancestors of Neku Siyar

16. Nur-ud-din Muhammad Jahangir, Mughal Emperor
8. Shahab-ud-din Muhammad Shah Jahan I, Mughal Emperor (= 24)
17. Jagat Gosain
4. Muhi-ud-din Muhammad Aurangzeb, Mughal Emperor
18. Abu'l-Hasan Asaf Khan
9. Mumtaz Mahal (= 25)
19. Diwanji Begum
2. Muhammad Akbar
20. Mirza Rustam Safawi
10. Mirza Badi-uz-Zaman Safavi
5. Dilras Banu Begum
22. Mirza Muhammad Sharif
11. Nauras Banu Begum
1. Niku Siyar
24. Shahab-ud-din Muhammad Shah Jahan I, Mughal Emperor (= 8)
12. Dara Shikoh
25. Mumtaz Mahal (= 9)
6. Sulaiman Shikoh
26. Parviz Mirza
13. Nadira Banu Begum
27. Jahan Banu Begum
3. Salima Banu Begum
