= Gauhar Ara Begum =

Mughal princess (1631–1706)

- Shahzadi of the Mughal Empire
- Born: 17 June 1631; Burhanpur, Mughal Empire
- Died: 1706 (aged 74–75); Delhi, Mughal Empire
- House: Timurid
- Father: Shah Jahan
- Mother: Mumtaz Mahal
- Religion: Sunni Islam

Gauhar Ara Begum (Persian: گوہر آرا بیگم, lit. 'Adorned in Gems'; 17 June 1631 – c. 1706) was a Mughal princess and the 14th and youngest child of the Mughal emperor Shah Jahan and his wife Mumtaz Mahal.

Her mother died giving birth to her in 1631. Gauhar Ara, however, survived the childbirth and lived for another three-quarters of a century. Little is known about her and whether she was involved in the war of succession for her father's throne.

Gauhar Ara died in 1706, aged about 75.

== Life ==
Born on 17 June 1631, the day her mother Mumtaz Mahal died, Gauhar Ara Begum appears to have kept a fairly low profile throughout the reigns of her father and brother. She was primarily raised and educated by her mother's lady-in-waiting Sati-al-Nesāʾ. Evidence vaguely indicates that she may have supported her fourth brother Murad Bakhsh's bid for the throne during the War of Succession. Were this to be true, this role was unlikely to have been particularly active since, unlike her father and sister Jahanara, she was not imprisoned afterwards by her victorious brother Aurangzeb.

Following her father's downfall, she involved herself in the organising of the marriages of her relatives. When Sipihr Shikoh, son of her eldest brother Dara married Aurangzeb's daughter Zubdat-un-Nissa in 1673, Gauhar Ara and her maternal cousin Hamida Banu Begum arranged the wedding ceremony. She had taken a greater role in 1672 with the marriage of Dara's granddaughter Salima Banu Begum (whom Gauhar Ara had adopted and raised) and Aurangzeb's fourth son, Prince Muhammad Akbar. She took the place of the bride's mother, with the wedding being described as a gala event: "On both sides of the road from the Delhi gate to the mansion of the Begum (i.e. Gauhar Ara), wooden structures were set up for illumination."

== Death ==
Gauhar Ara Begum died in Shahjahanabad in 1706. Aurangzeb, who was stationed in the Deccan at the time, was stricken by the death. He was reported to have continuously repeated, "Of all the children of Shah Jahan, she and I alone were left."

== Ancestry ==
Ancestors of Gauhar Ara Begum

8. Jalal-ud-din Muhammad Akbar, Mughal Emperor
4. Nur-ud-din Muhammad Jahangir, Mughal Emperor
9. Mariam-uz-Zamani
2. Shahab-ud-din Muhammad Shah Jahan I, Mughal Emperor
10. Udai Singh, Raja of Marwar
5. Jagat Gosain
11. Manrang Devi of Gwalior
1. Gauhar Ara Begum
12. I'timad-ud-Daulah
6. Abu'l-Hasan Asaf Khan
13. Asmat Begam
3. Mumtaz Mahal
14. Ghias ud-din ‘Ali Asaf Khan
7. Diwanji Begum

== In popular culture ==
- Gauhar Ara Begum is a principal character in Ruchir Gupta's novel Mistress of the Throne (2014).
