= Muhammad Azam Shah =

Mughal emperor in 1707

Azam Shah اعظم شاه
- Padishah; Al-Sultan Al-Azam
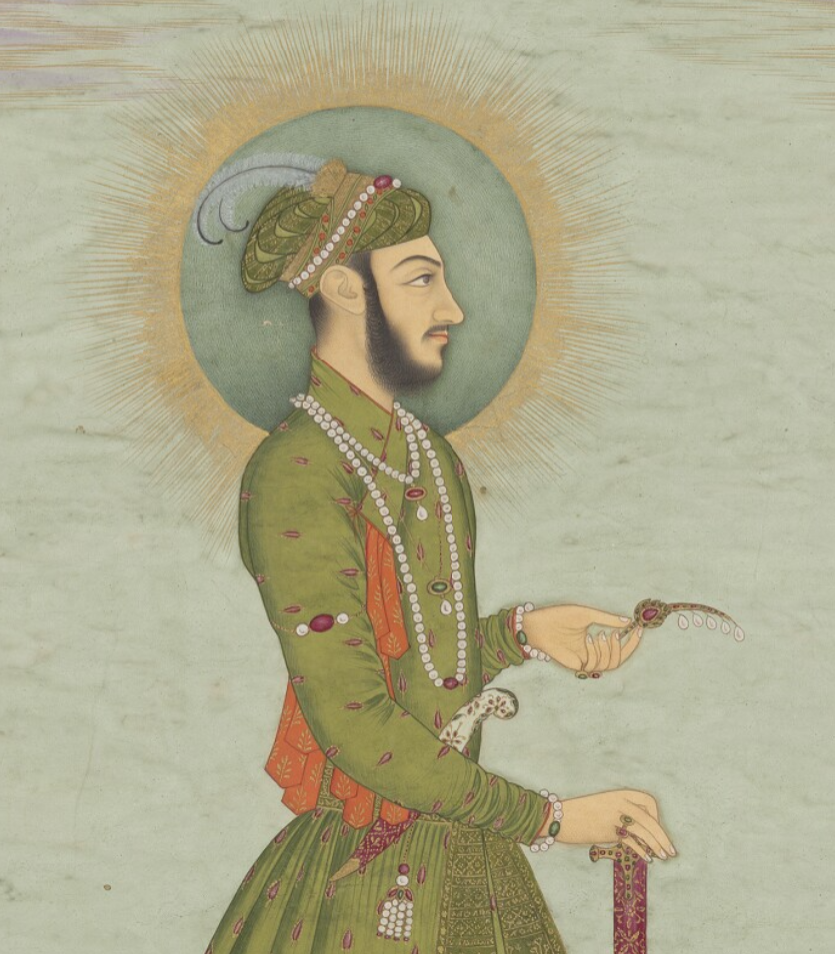
- Azam Shah holding a turban jewel c. 1675

Mughal Emperor
- Reign: 14 March – 20 June 1707
- Predecessor: Alamgir I
- Successor: Bahadur Shah I
- Grand Vizier: Asad Khan
Other governmental responsibilities
Subahdar of Bengal
Reign	1677–1680
Predecessor	Fidai Khan II
Successor	Shaista Khan
- Born: 28 June 1653; Shahi Qila, Burhanpur, Mughal Empire
- Died: 20 June 1707 (aged 53); Agra Subah, Mughal Empire
- Burial: Khuldabad, Maharashtra, India
- Consort: Jahanzib Banu (m. 1669; died 1705)
- Wives: Rahmat Banu (m. 1668; died 1684); Shahar Banu (m. 1681)
- Issue: Bidar Bakht; Jawan Bakht; Sikandar Shan; Wala Jah; Zih Jah; Wala Shan; Ali Tabar; Gittiara; Iffatara; Najib al-Nisa
Names
- Mirza Abu al-Fayaz Qutb al-Din Muhammad Azam Shah
- House: Mughal
- Dynasty: Timurid
- Father: Alamgir I
- Mother: Dilras Banu
- Religion: Sunni Islam (Hanafi)

Mirza Abu al-Fayaz Qutb al-Din Muhammad Aazam (Persian: ابوالفیاض قطب الدین محمد اعظم; 28 June 1653 – 20 June 1707), commonly known as Azam Shah (Persian: اعظم شاه), was briefly the seventh Mughal emperor from 14 March to 20 June 1707. He was the third son of the sixth Mughal emperor Aurangzeb and his chief consort Dilras Banu Begum.

Azam was appointed as the heir-apparent (Shahi Ali Jah) to his father on 12 August 1681 and retained that position until Aurangzeb's death. During his long military career, he served as the viceroy of Berar Subah, Malwa, Bengal, Gujarat and the Deccan. Azam ascended the Mughal throne in Ahmednagar upon the death of his father on 14 March 1707. However, he and his three sons, Bidar Bakht, Jawan Bakht and Sikandar Shan, were later defeated and killed by Azam Shah's older half-brother, Shah Alam (later crowned as Bahadur Shah I), during the Battle of Jajau on 20 June 1707.

== Early life ==
=== Birth ===
Qutb-ud-Din Muhammad Azam was born on 28 June 1653 in Burhanpur to Prince Muhi-ud-Din (later known as 'Aurangzeb' upon his accession) and his first wife, Dilras Banu Begum. His mother, who died four years after giving birth to him, was the daughter of Mirza Badi-uz-Zaman Safavi (titled Shah Nawaz Khan) and a princess of the prominent Safavid dynasty of Persia. Therefore, Azam was not only a Timurid from his father's side, but also had in him the royal blood of the Safavid dynasty, a fact which Azam was extremely proud of and after the death of his younger brother, Prince Muhammad Akbar, the only son of Aurangzeb who could boast of being of the purest blood.

Azam's other half-brothers, Shah Alam (later Bahadur Shah I) and Muhammad Kam Bakhsh were the sons of Aurangzeb's Hindu wives. According to Niccolao Manucci, the courtiers were very impressed by Azam's royal Persian ancestry and the fact that he was the grandson of Shah Nawaz Khan Safavi.

=== Character ===
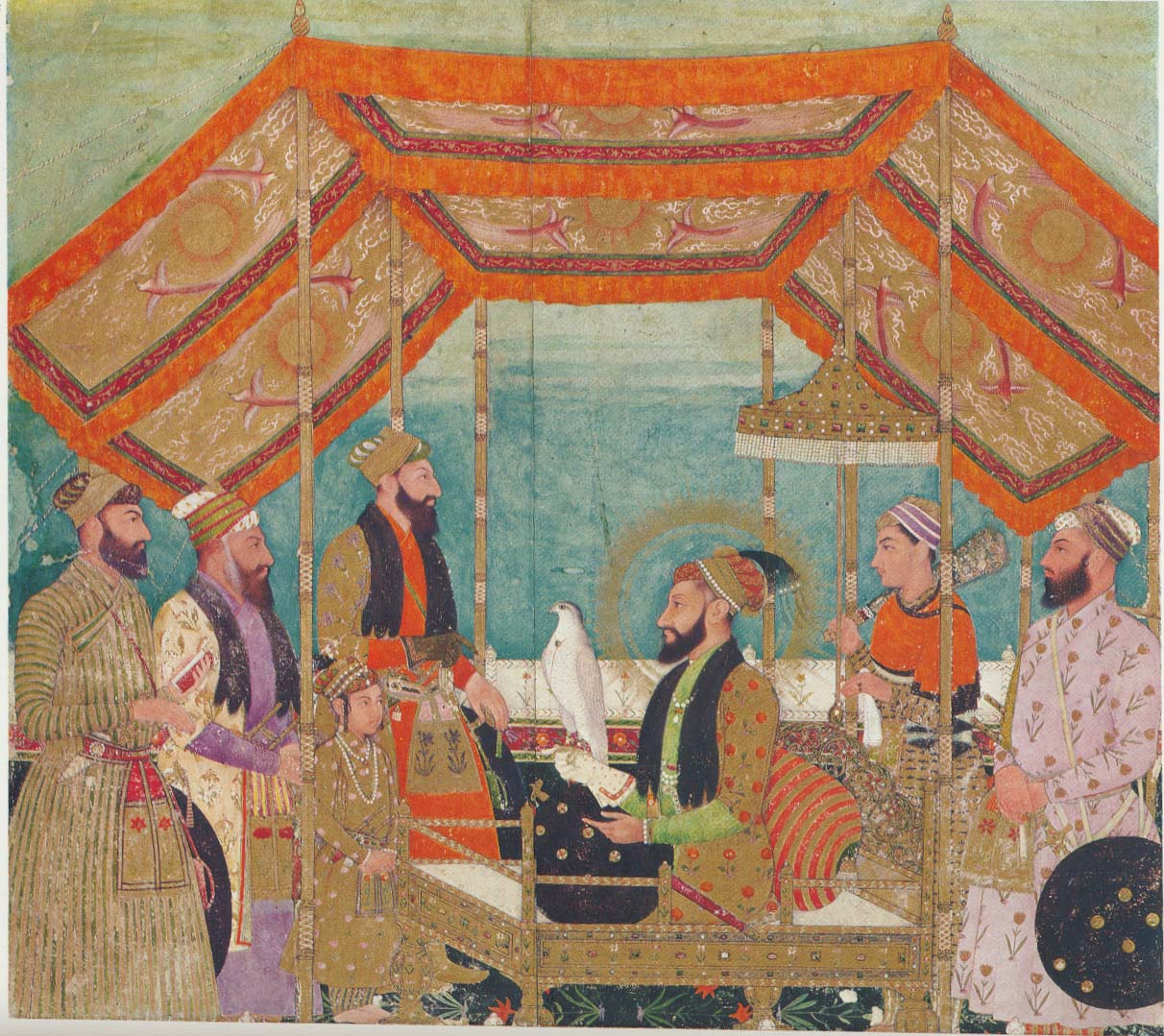
Crown Prince Azam, stands before his father, Emperor Aurangzeb

As Azam grew up, he was distinguished for his wisdom, excellence, and chivalry. Aurangzeb used to be extremely delighted with his son's noble character and excellent manners, and thought of him as his comrade rather than his son. He often used to say, "between this pair of matchless friends, a separation is imminent." Azam's siblings included his older sisters, the princesses: Zeb-un-Nissa, Zinat-un-Nissa, Zubdat-un-Nissa and his younger brother, Prince Muhammad Akbar.

== Personal life ==
On 13 May 1668, Azam married an Ahom princess, Ramani Gabharu, who was renamed Rahmat Banu Begum. She was the daughter of the Ahom king, Swargadeo Jayadhwaj Singha, and the marriage was a political one. On 3 January 1669, Azam married his first cousin, Princess Jahanzeb Banu Begum, the daughter of his eldest uncle Crown prince Dara Shikoh and his beloved wife, Nadira Banu Begum.

Jahanzeb was his chief consort and his favourite wife, being greatly loved by him. She gave birth to their eldest son on 4 August 1670. He was named 'Bidar Bakht' by his grandfather. Aurangzeb, throughout his life, showed marks of exceptional love to Azam and Jahanzeb (who his favourite daughter-in-law) and to Prince Bidar Bakht, who was a gallant and successful general, on all three of whom he used to constantly lavish gifts. Bidar Bakht was also Aurangzeb's favourite grandson.

In a marriage of political alliance, Azam later married his third wife, Shahar Banu Begum (titled Padshah Bibi) in 1681. She was a princess of the Adil Shahi dynasty and was the daughter of Ali Adil Shah II, the ruler of Bijapur. Despite his other marriages, Azam's love for Jahanzeb remained unchanged. For when she died in 1705, he was filled with great sorrow and despair which darkened the remainder of his life.

Another of his concubines was the mother of Prince Wala Jah Mirza, born on 5 August 1683 and died on 8 June 1707, and Prince Wala Shan born on 1 August 1684. Another concubine was Kirpapuri Mahal, the mother of Ali Tabar Mirza, who was born in 1697 and died on 28 May 1734, and was buried along with his mother in the mausoleum she had built for herself.

== Siege of Bijapur ==
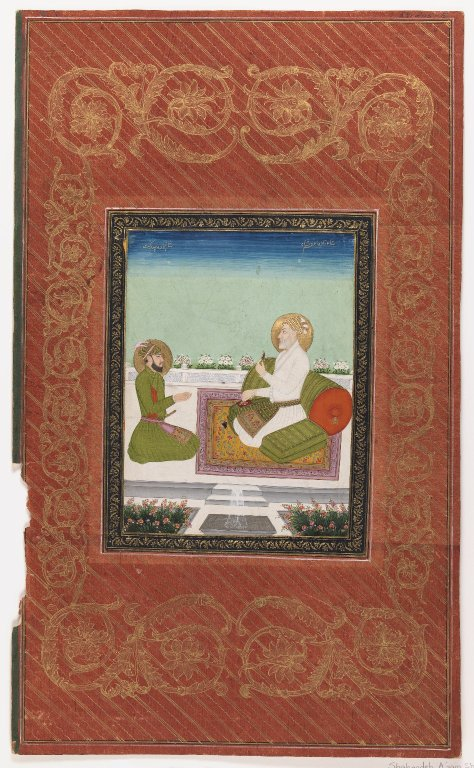
Muhammad Azam with his son, Prince Bidar Bakht

In 1685, Aurangzeb dispatched his son Muhammad Azam Shah with a force of nearly 50,000 men to capture Bijapur Fort and defeat Sikandar Adil Shah, the ruler of Bijapur, who refused to be a vassal. The Mughals led by Muhammad Azam Shah could not make any advancements upon Bijapur Fort mainly due to the superior usage of cannon batteries on both sides. Outraged by the stalemate, Aurangzeb himself arrived on 4 September 1686 and commanded the Siege of Bijapur after eight days of fighting and the Mughals were victorious.

== Subahdar of Bengal ==
Prince Azam was appointed the governor (Subahdar) of Berar Subah, Malwa and Bengal from 1678 to 1701 upon the death of his predecessor, Azam Khan Koka. He successfully captured the Kamrup region in February 1679. He founded the incomplete Lalbagh Fort in Dacca. During his administration, Mir Maula was appointed Diwan and Muluk Chand as Huzur-Navis for revenue collection. Prince Azam was recalled by Aurangzeb and left Dacca on 6 October 1679. Under Marathas Bengal went under administration of the Nawabs of Murshidabad.

He later became the governor of Gujarat from 1701 to 1706.

== Accession ==
In the third week of February 1707, in a bid to prevent a war of succession, Aurangzeb separated Azam and his younger half-brother, Kam Baksh, whom Azam particularly loathed. He sent Azam to Malwa and Kam Baksh to Bijapur. A few days before his death, he wrote farewell letters to Azam. The next morning, Azam who had tarried outside Ahmednagar instead of proceeding to Malwa, arrived at the imperial camp and conveyed his father's body for burial at his tomb at Daulatabad. Azam Shah proclaimed himself Emperor and seized the throne. In the political struggles following the disputed succession, he and his son Prince Bidar Bakht were defeated and killed in the Battle of Jajau on 20 June 1707 against elder half-brother, Prince Muhammad Mu'azzam, who succeeded their father to the Mughal throne. Azam Shah was killed by a musket shot, which is believed to have been fired by Isa Khan Manj, a Punjabi warlord of the Lakhi Jangal in the Lahore Subah. His grave along with that of his wife, lies in the dargah complex of Sufi saint, Sheikh Zainuddin, at Khuldabad near Aurangabad, which also houses the tomb of Aurangzeb to the west.

== Full title ==
Padshah-i-Mumalik Abu'l Faaiz Qutb-ud-Din Muhammad Azam Shah-i-Ali Jah Ghazi

== In popular culture ==
=== Films and television ===
- He was portrayed by Chetan Hansraj in the 2017 Peshwa Bajirao (TV series).
- He was portrayed by Trishan Singh in the 2025 Hindi film Chhaava.

Muhammad Azam Shah Timurid dynasty Born: 28 June 1653 Died: 8 June 1707
Regnal titles
Preceded by Aurangzeb	Mughal Emperor; 1707	Succeeded by Bahadur Shah I
