= Zinat-un-Nissa Begum =

Mughal princess (1643–1721)

- Shahzadi of the Mughal Empire
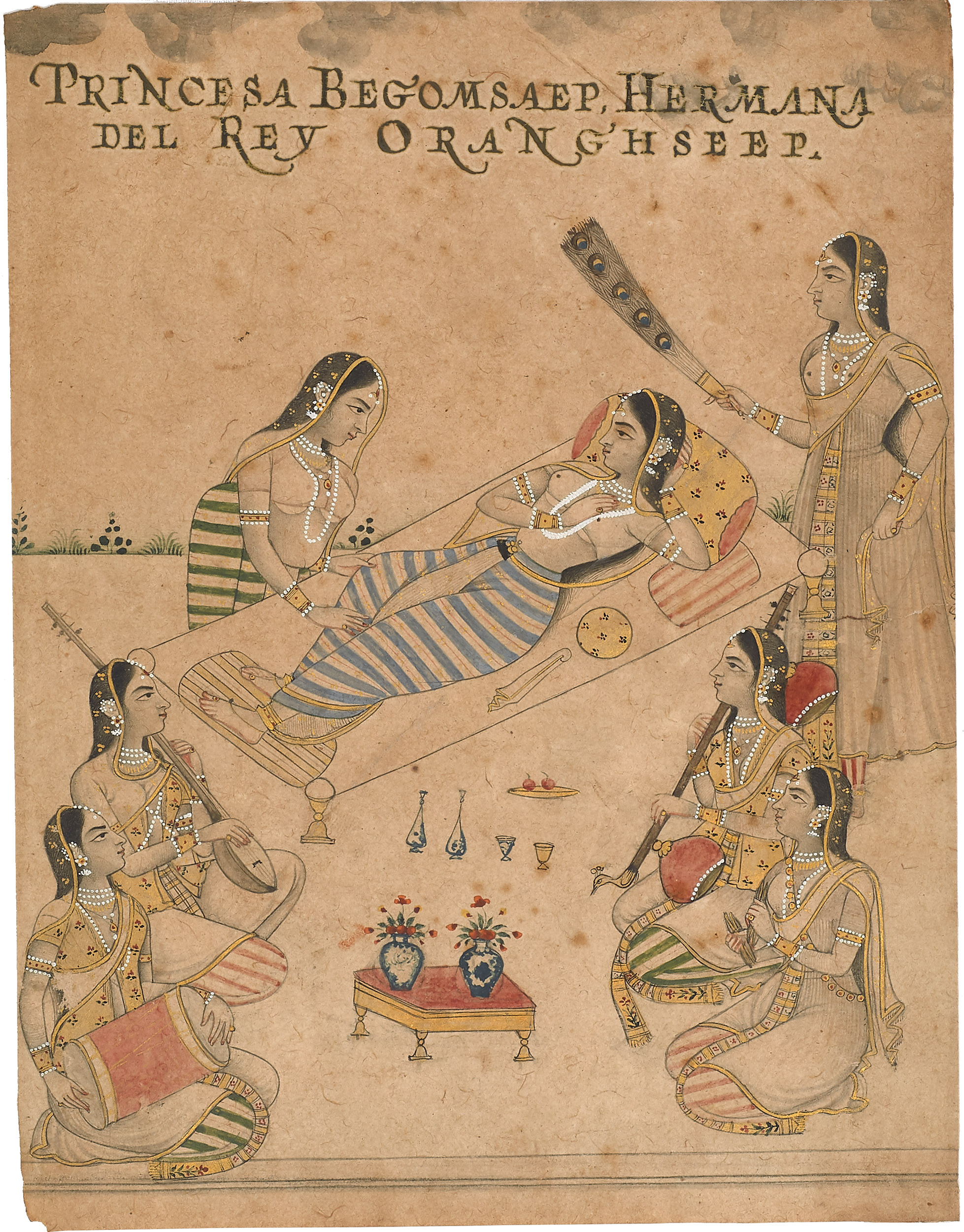
- Zinat and her sisters

Padshah Begum
- Tenure: 1681 – 7 May 1721
- Predecessor: Jahanara Begum
- Successor: Badshah Begum
- Born: 5 October 1643; Aurangabad, Mughal Empire, Now Chhatrapati Sambhajinagar
- Died: 7 May 1721 (aged 77); Delhi, Mughal Empire
- Burial: Zeenat-ul-Masajid, Delhi
- House: Timurid
- Father: Aurangzeb
- Mother: Dilras Banu Begum
- Religion: Sunni Islam

Zinat-un-Nissa Begum (Persian: زینت النساء بیگم; 5 October 1643 – 7 May 1721) was a Mughal princess and the second daughter of Emperor Aurangzeb and his Chief consort Dilras Banu Begum. Her father had conferred upon her the honorable title of Padshah Begum.

== Life ==
Zinat-un-Nissa Begum ("Jewel among Women") was born on 5 October 1643, probably in Aurangabad, to Dilras Banu Begum, Aurangzeb's first wife and chief consort. Her mother was a princess of the prominent Safavid dynasty of Persia and was a daughter of Mirza Badi-uz-Zaman Safavi, the Viceroy of Gujarat. Her paternal grandfather was the fifth Mughal emperor Shah Jahan during whose reign she was born. Zinat-un-Nissa had in-depth knowledge of the doctrines of Islam, just like her elder sister, Princess Zeb-un-Nisa and her younger sister, Princess Zubdat-un-Nissa Begum. She was educated by private tutors and scholars, and refused to marry, choosing to remain single her entire life.

Zinat was a partisan of her youngest half-brother, Muhammad Kam Bakhsh, for whom she gained pardon from her father on several occasions. Though her full brother, Azam Shah, had a strong disliking for him. She was her father's sole companion during the later part of his reign, along with his concubine Udaipuri Mahal. She was the superintendent of her father's household in the Deccan for a quarter of a century till his death in 1707. She survived him many years, enjoying the respect of his successors as the living memorial of a great age.

== Contributions to architecture ==
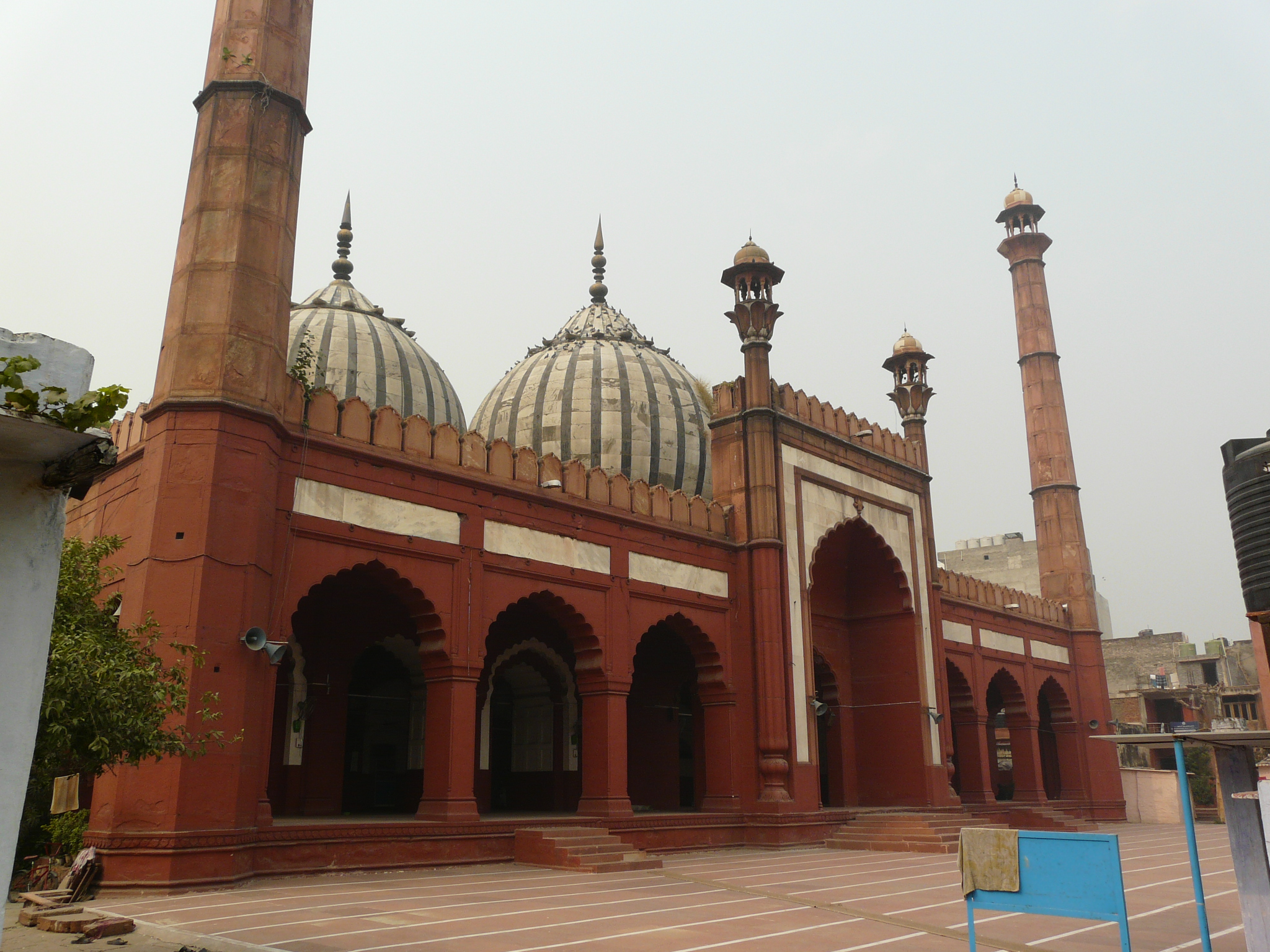
The Zeenat-ul-Masajid built by Zeenat-un-Nissa, located in Daryaganj, Delhi.

Zinat-un-Nissa is known to have built fourteen caravanserais. At the age of thirty-seven, she undertook a project to construct a number of inns of the highway linking Awadh with Bengal. This effort of hers earned her the praise of her father. She also had the Zeenat-ul-Masajid ("Ornament of Mosques") constructed at her expense in c.1700 by the riverside wall of the Red Fort in Delhi, where she was buried. Tradition goes that she demanded the amount of her dowry from her father, and spent it in building the mosque.

== Death ==
Zinat-un-Nissa Begum died at Delhi on 18 May 1721 at the age of 77 years.

== Ancestry ==
Ancestors of Zinat-un-Nissa Begum

16. Jalal-ud-din Muhammad Akbar, Mughal Emperor
8. Nur-ud-din Muhammad Jahangir, Mughal Emperor
17. Mariam-uz-Zamani
4. Shahab-ud-din Muhammad Shah Jahan I, Mughal Emperor
18. Udai Singh, Raja of Marwar
9. Jagat Gosain
19. Manrang Devi of Gwalior
2. Muhi-ud-din Muhammad Aurangzeb, Mughal Emperor
20. I'timad-ud-Daulah (= 28)
10. Abu'l-Hasan Asaf Khan
21. Asmat Begam (= 29)
5. Mumtaz Mahal
22. Ghias ud-din ‘Ali Asaf Khan
11. Diwanji Begum
1. Zeenat-un-Nissa
24. Sultan Hussain Safawi
12. Mirza Rustam Safavi
6. Mirza Badi-uz-Zaman Safavi
3. Dilras Banu Begum
28. I'timad-ud-Daulah (= 20)
14. Mirza Muhammad Sharif
29. Asmat Begam (= 21)
7. Nauras Banu Begum

== In popular culture ==
=== Films and television ===
- She was portrayed by Deepshikha Nagpal in the 2017 Hindi Peshwa Bajirao (TV series).
- She was portrayed by Diana Penty in the 2025 Hindi film Chhaava.

== See also ==
- Zeenat Mahal
