= Dilras Banu Begum =

First wife of Emperor Aurangzeb (c. 1622 – 1657)

(Rabia) Dilras Banu Begum
- Safavid Princess
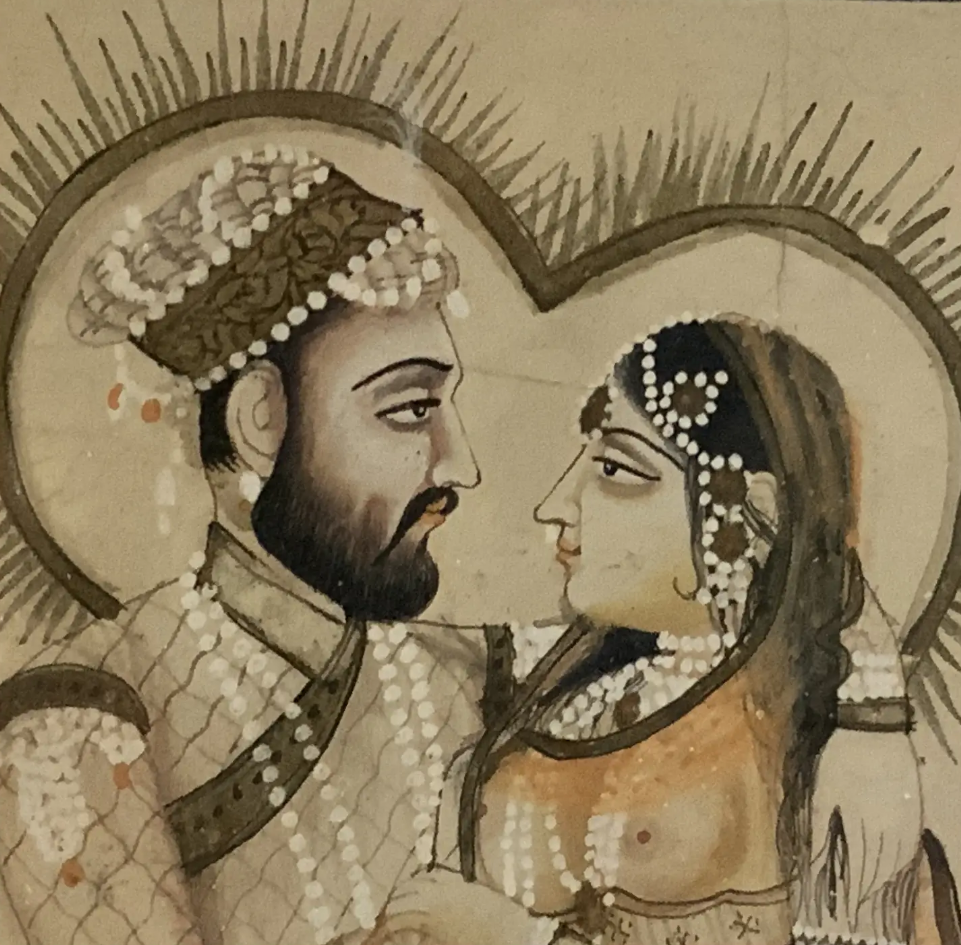
- Born: c. 1622
- Died: 8 October 1657 (aged 34–35); Aurangabad, India
- Burial: Bibi Ka Maqbara, Aurangabad
- Spouse: Aurangzeb (m. 1637)
- Issue: Zeb-un-Nissa; Zinat-un-Nissa; Zubdat-un-Nissa; Muhammad Azam Shah; Sultan Muhammad Akbar
- House: Safavid (by birth); Timurid (by marriage)
- Father: Shah Nawaz Khan Safavi
- Mother: Nauras Banu Begum
- Religion: Shia Islam

(Rabia) Dilras Banu Begum (Urdu pronunciation: [dɪlrəs ˈbaːnuː ˈbeːgəm]; c. 1622 – 8 October 1657) was the first wife and chief consort of Emperor Aurangzeb after Marriage she changed her name from Rabia to Dilras , the sixth Mughal emperor. She is also known by her posthumous title, Rabia-ud-Durrani ("Rabia of the Age"). The Bibi Ka Maqbara in Aurangabad, which bears a striking resemblance to the Taj Mahal (the mausoleum of Aurangzeb's mother Mumtaz Mahal), was commissioned by her husband to act as her final resting place.

Dilras was a member of the Safavid dynasty of Persia and was the daughter of Mirza Badi-uz-Zaman Safavi (titled Shahnawaz Khan), a descendant of Shah Ismail I, who served as the viceroy of Gujarat. She married Prince Muhi-ud-din (later known as 'Aurangzeb' upon his accession) in 1637 and bore him five children, including: Muhammad Azam Shah (the heir apparent anointed by Aurangzeb), who temporarily succeeded his father as Mughal emperor, the gifted poet Princess Zeb-un-Nissa (Aurangzeb's favourite daughter), Princess Zinat-un-Nissa (titled Padshah Begum), and Sultan Muhammad Akbar, the Emperor's best-loved son.

Dilras died possibly of puerperal fever in 1657, a month after giving birth to her fifth child, Muhammad Akbar, and just a year before her husband ascended the throne after a fratricidal war of succession.

== Family and lineage ==
(Rabia) Dilras Banu Begum was a member of the prominent Safavid dynasty, the ruling dynasty of Persia and one of its most significant ruling dynasties. She was the daughter of Mirza Badi-uz-Zaman Safavi (titled Shahnawaz Khan and popularly known as Mirza Deccan) whose great-grandfather was a son of Shah Ismail I Safavi, the founder of the Safavid dynasty. Shahnawaz Khan was the viceroy of Gujarat and a powerful, high ranking grandee at the Mughal court. He loved pomp and grandeur, which was very evident in the lavish and grand marriage celebrations of his daughter, Dilras to Prince Muhi-ud-Din.

Dilras' mother, Nauras Banu Begum, was the daughter of Mirza Muhammad Sharif, while her father was a son of Mirza Rustam Safavi, who rose to eminence during Emperor Jahangir's reign. In 1638, Dilras' younger sister, Sakina Banu Begum, married Aurangzeb's youngest brother, Prince Murad Baksh. A niece of Shahnawaz Khan and cousin of Dilras was also married to Aurangzeb's older brother Prince Shah Shuja. These marriages further strengthened the ties between the imperial family and Shahnawaz Khan's family, and as an extension, the Safavid dynasty.

== Marriage to Aurangzeb ==
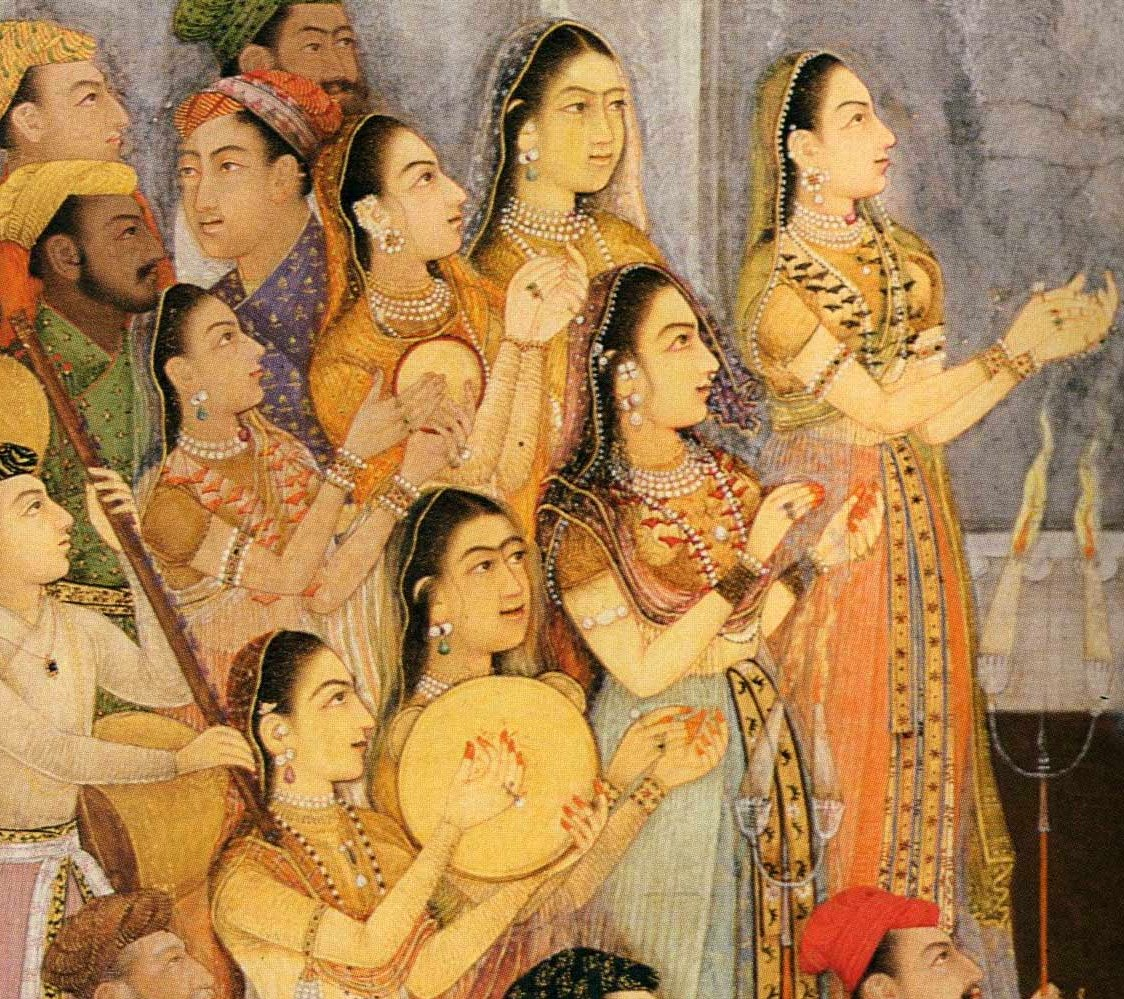
Female musicians at the wedding of Dilras Begum and Aurangzeb.

In February 1637, Dilras was betrothed to Prince Muhi-ud-din (later known as Aurangzeb), the third son of the reigning Mughal emperor Shah Jahan and his wife Mumtaz Mahal. The marriage proposal was put forth by Shah Jahan and was accepted by Dilras' father which led to their betrothal. Aurangzeb was lovingly called by the Emperor from the Deccan, where he was campaigning, and arrived at Agra on 15 April 1637 for his wedding. This occurred on 8 May 1637.

As decided by the imperial court astrologers, their marriage ceremony was held four hours before dawn, amid lavish and grand celebrations and took place at Shahnawaz Khan's mansion. The grandeur of the celebrations are described by chronicler Khafi Khan, "The burst of fireworks transformed the earth into another sky," and the charms of the singers and dancers would've been the envy "even of Venus." The qazi married the couple in the Emperor's presence, and the mehr was fixed at 400,000 rupees. After the wedding, a reception (walima) was held on 14 May at Aurangzeb's mansion, where Emperor Shah Jahan gave wedding gifts to amirs.

The newly married couple spent more than three happy months at Agra with the Emperor before taking their leave for the Deccan on 4 September 1637, where Aurangzeb was serving as viceroy. During their stay at Agra, Dilras had become pregnant with Aurangzeb's first child: the gifted poet Princess Zeb-un-Nissa. She was born nine months after their marriage on 15 February 1638 at Daulatabad, Deccan, and was her father's favourite daughter. Over the next nineteen years, the imperial couple would have four more children, all of whom were favoured by Aurangzeb above the rest of his children from his secondary wives. As Aurangzeb's chief consort, Dilras wielded considerable influence over him and ruled his harem. She was amongst the highest ranked figures at the Mughal court unlike her husband's secondary wives, who were very unpopular at court. However, Dilras did not take part in court politics and in administrative affairs as her husband did not seem to have allowed his wives to interfere in such matters. But, it is said that it is true that Muhi-ud-din rules over the provinces where he was acting as Na'ib (viceroy), but in the house of this Dilras Banu who rules over him.

Dilras' known physical and personal attributes describe her as being beautiful, vivacious and charming. Pertaining to her character, she seems to have been a proud and self-willed woman and her husband stood in some awe of her. She was reputed to have been short-tempered, and was, says Aurangzeb, a woman of "extreme imperiousness, but to the end of her life I continued to love her and never once did I wound her feelings." Dilras' proud nature did not create problems in her marriage as Aurangzeb always acted humbly with his haughty and imperious wife. From all accounts it appears that Dilras shared several character traits with her husband. Both of them were strong-willed, pious and comparatively indifferent to the normal scheme of material values.

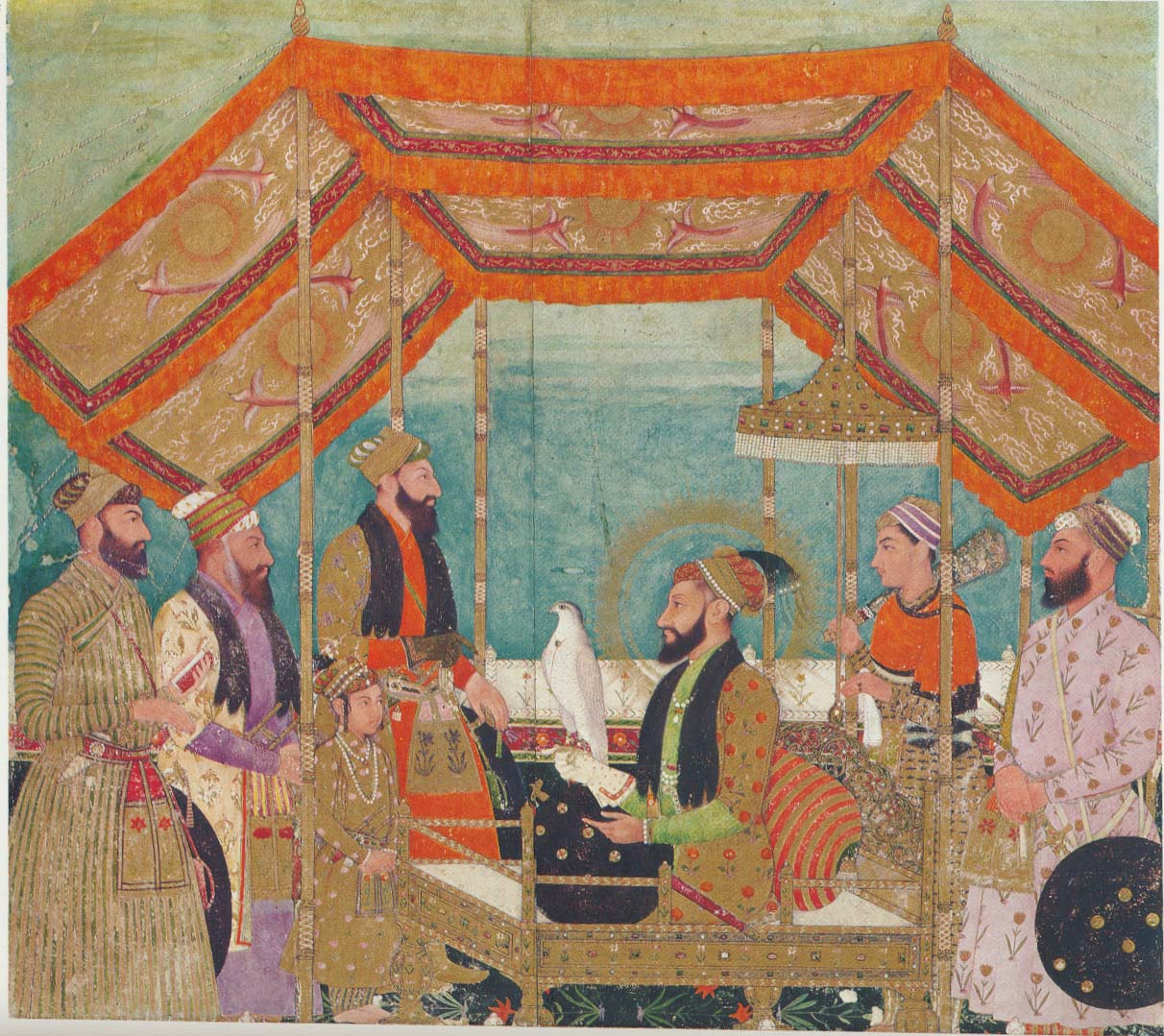
Dilras' eldest son, Azam Shah, stands before his father, Aurangzeb.

However, whereas Aurangzeb was a staunch Sunni, Dilras Begum was a devout Shia. Safavid Shias grew in Aurangzeb's reign became even more influential than ever in the Mughal empire and their military leaders led almost all of Aurangzeb's successful military campaigns.

Aurangzeb's other marriages to his two secondary wives were meaningless. As a result, these two inferior wives, though they produced four more children for him, remained isolated from their husband. The status and authority of being the imperial consort was reserved for Dilras only. She retained her influence over her husband till the end of her life and always remained his favourite as well as his chief consort. Even after her untimely death, her position at court, in the palace, and in her husband's life was not taken by either of his secondary wives. Thus, Dilras was never replaced and no empress ruled Aurangzeb's palace.

=== Issue ===
Dilras' initial pregnancies took place at intervals of at least four years. Professor Annie Krieger-Krynicki states that "Aurangzeb may not have wanted to put a strain on her fragile health by imposing too many pregnancies on her frequently, as Shah Jahan, fatally, had done with Mumtaz Mahal." During the course of their twenty years of marriage, the imperial couple became parents of five children:

- Shahzadi Zeb-un-Nissa Begum (15 February 1638 – 26 May 1702) died unmarried.
- Shahzadi Zinat-un-Nissa Begum (5 October 1643 – 7 May 1721) acted as the First Lady (Padshah Begum) of the empire during Aurangzeb's reign, she died unmarried.
- Shahzadi Zubdat-un-Nissa Begum (2 September 1651 – 17 February 1707) married her first cousin, Prince Siphir Shikoh, son of her uncle, Dara Shikoh; had issue.
- Shahzada Muhammad Azam Shah Shahi Ali Jah (28 June 1653 – 8 June 1707), briefly succeeded his father as Mughal emperor, married his first cousin, Princess Jahanzeb Banu, a daughter of Dara Shikoh; had issue.
- Shahzada Sultan Muhammad Akbar (11 September 1657 – 31 March 1706) married his cousin, Princess Salima, a granddaughter of Dara Shikoh; had issue.

== Death and aftermath ==
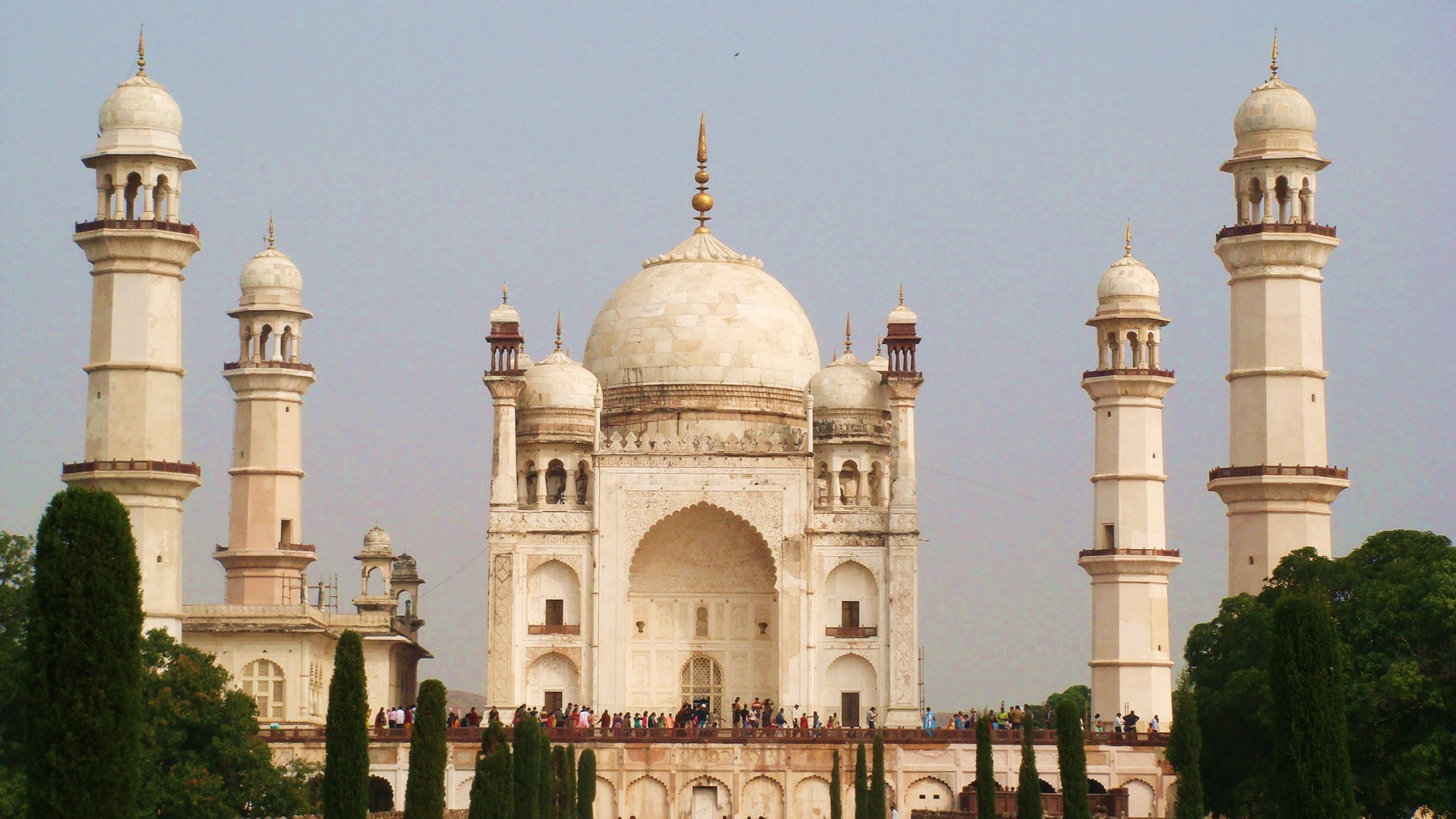
Bibi Ka Maqbara in Aurangabad

On 11 September 1657, Dilras gave birth to her fifth child, Muhammad Akbar, following which she possibly suffered from puerperal fever, due to complications caused by the delivery and died on 8 October 1657. Upon her death, Aurangzeb's pain was extreme, and their eldest son, the four-year-old Prince Azam, was so grieved that he had a nervous breakdown. It became Dilras' eldest daughter, Princess Zeb-un-Nissa's responsibility to take charge of her newborn brother. Zeb-un-Nissa doted on her brother, and at the same time, Aurangzeb greatly indulged his motherless son and the prince soon became his best-loved son.

=== Bibi Ka Maqbara ===
In 1660, three years after Dilras' death, Aurangzeb commissioned a mausoleum at Aurangabad to be her final resting place, known as Bibi Ka Maqbara ("Tomb of the Lady"). It is notable that Aurangzeb never raised monumental edifices during his half-a-century reign, but made just one exception, that is, to build the mausoleum of his wife. Here, Dilras was buried under the posthumous title of 'Rabia-ud-Daurani' ("Rabia of the Age"). Her title was given in honour after Rabia of Basra. Rabia of Basra lived in the 9th century CE and is considered a saint due to her piety. The Bibi Ka Maqbara bears a striking resemblance to the Taj Mahal, the mausoleum of Dilras' mother-in-law, Empress Mumtaz Mahal, who herself died in childbirth.

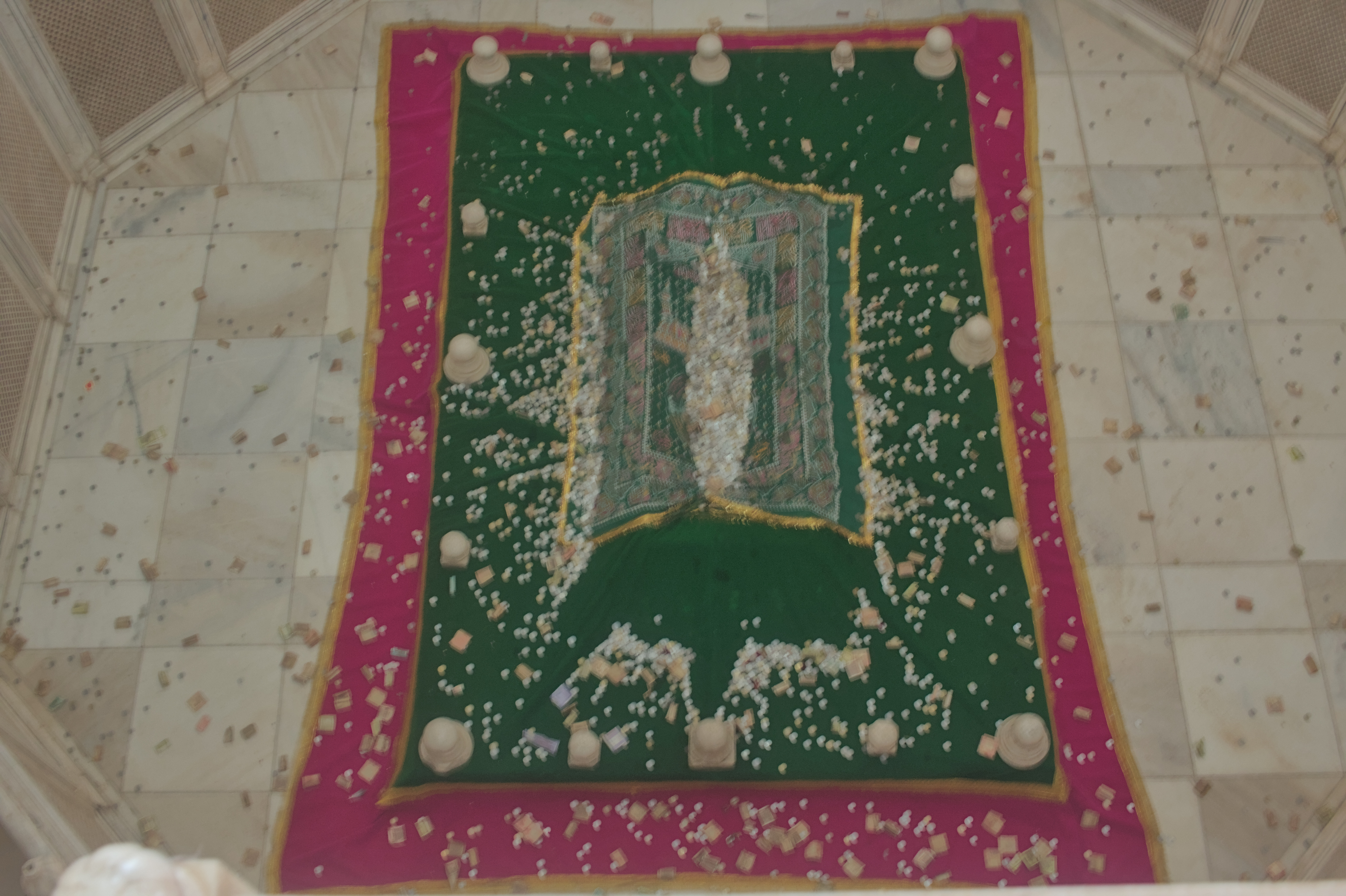
Cenotaph of Dilras Banu inside Bibi Ka Maqbara

Bibi Ka Maqbara was the largest structure that Aurangzeb had to his credit and is considered to be a symbol of his conjugal fidelity.

In the following years, her tomb was repaired by her son, Azam Shah, under Aurangzeb's orders. Aurangzeb, himself, is buried a few kilometers away from her mausoleum in Khuldabad.

== In popular culture ==
- Dilras Banu Begum is a principal character in Ruchir Gupta's historical novel Mistress of the Throne (2014).
- She is a main character in the 2016 novel Shahenshah: The Life of Aurangzeb written by N.S. Inamdar and Vikrant Pande.
- Dilras is an important character in the 2018 novel Frontiers: The Relentless Battle between Aurangzeb and Shivaji written by Medha Deshmukh Bhaskaran.
- She might be portrayed by Alia Bhatt in the upcoming epic film Takht (2020) directed by Karan Johar.

== Ancestry ==
Ancestors of Dilras Banu Begum

8. Soltan Hosayn Mirza Safavi
4. Rustam Mirza Safavi
2. Shah Nawaz Khan
1. Dilras Banu Begum
12. I'timad-ud-Daulah
6. Mirza Muhammad Sharif
13. Asmat Begum
3. Nauras Banu Begum

== See also ==
- Bibi Ka Maqbara
- Safavid dynasty
- Aurangzeb
