= Shahi Qila =

Shahi Qila may refer to:

- Shahi Qila, Burhanpur, a fort in Burhanpur, Madhya Pradesh, India
- Shahi Qila, Jaunpur, a fort built during the 14th century in Jaunpur, Uttar Pradesh, India
- Shahi Qila, Lahore, a citadel built during the 17th century in Pakistan
