= Hur-ul-Nisa Begum =

Mughal princess (1613–1616)

Hur al-Nisa Begum
- Shahzadi
- Born: 30 March 1613; Akbarabad, Mughal Empire
- Died: 5 June 1616 (aged 3); Ajmer, Mughal Empire
- Burial: Ajmer, Mughal Empire
- Dynasty: Timurid dynasty
- Father: Shah Jahan
- Mother: Mumtaz Mahal
- Religion: Sunni Islam

Hur-ul-Nisa (30 March 1613 – 5 June 1616) was a Mughal princess, the first daughter of Mughal Emperor, Shah Jahan and his chief consort, Mumtaz Mahal.

== Life ==
Born on 30 March 1613 at Akbarabad, she was named Hur al-Nisa Begum by her paternal grandfather, Emperor Jahangir who adopted her as his own daughter. She was the first of the fourteen children born to Prince Khurram and his wife, Arjumand Banu Begum. Her maternal grandfather was Asaf Khan IV, the Grand vizier during the reign of her father.

She was deeply loved by Emperor Jahangir and his household.

== Death ==
On 21 May 1616, Hur fell ill with smallpox and on 5 June, "the bird of her spirit took wing from this eternal cage and flew to the gardens of Paradise."

Jahangir, who was deeply attached to her, was so very much grieved at the death of this grandchild that he could not bring himself to note down her death and had requested Mirza Ghiyas Beg to do so. Jahangir did not receive servants on the first two days after her death and ordered her room to be walled up. On the third day, unable to bear the grief anymore, he went to the house of Prince Khurram and stayed there for several days. While on his way to the Prince's house, the Emperor broke down several times at the thought of the "heavenly child". He then went to the house of Asaf Khan IV, the departed child's maternal grandfather, to keep himself occupied. Yet, for as long as he stayed in Ajmer, he broke down at every familiar thing.

Since the child died on a Wednesday, Jahangir ordered the day to be called "Gumshamba" or "day of loss".

She was buried near the grave of Mu'in al-Din Chishti at Ajmer.

== Ancestry ==
Ancestors of Hur-ul-Nisa Begum

8. Jalal-ud-din Muhammad Akbar, Mughal Emperor
4. Nur-ud-din Muhammad Jahangir, Mughal Emperor
9. Mariam-uz-Zamani
2. Shahab-ud-din Muhammad Shah Jahan I, Mughal Emperor
10. Udai Singh, Raja of Marwar
5. Jagat Gosain
11. Manrang Devi of Gwalior
1. Hur-ul-Nisa Begum
12. I'timad-ud-Daulah
6. Abu'l-Hasan Asaf Khan
13. Asmat Begam
3. Mumtaz Mahal
14. Ghias ud-din 'Ali Asaf Khan
7. Diwanji Begum
