= Shahi Qila, Burhanpur =

Fortress in Central India

The Shahi Qila was a palace in Burhanpur, located to the east of the Tapti River. Little except ruins remain of the palace. However, the parts that still stand display amazing works of sculpture and exquisite carvings.

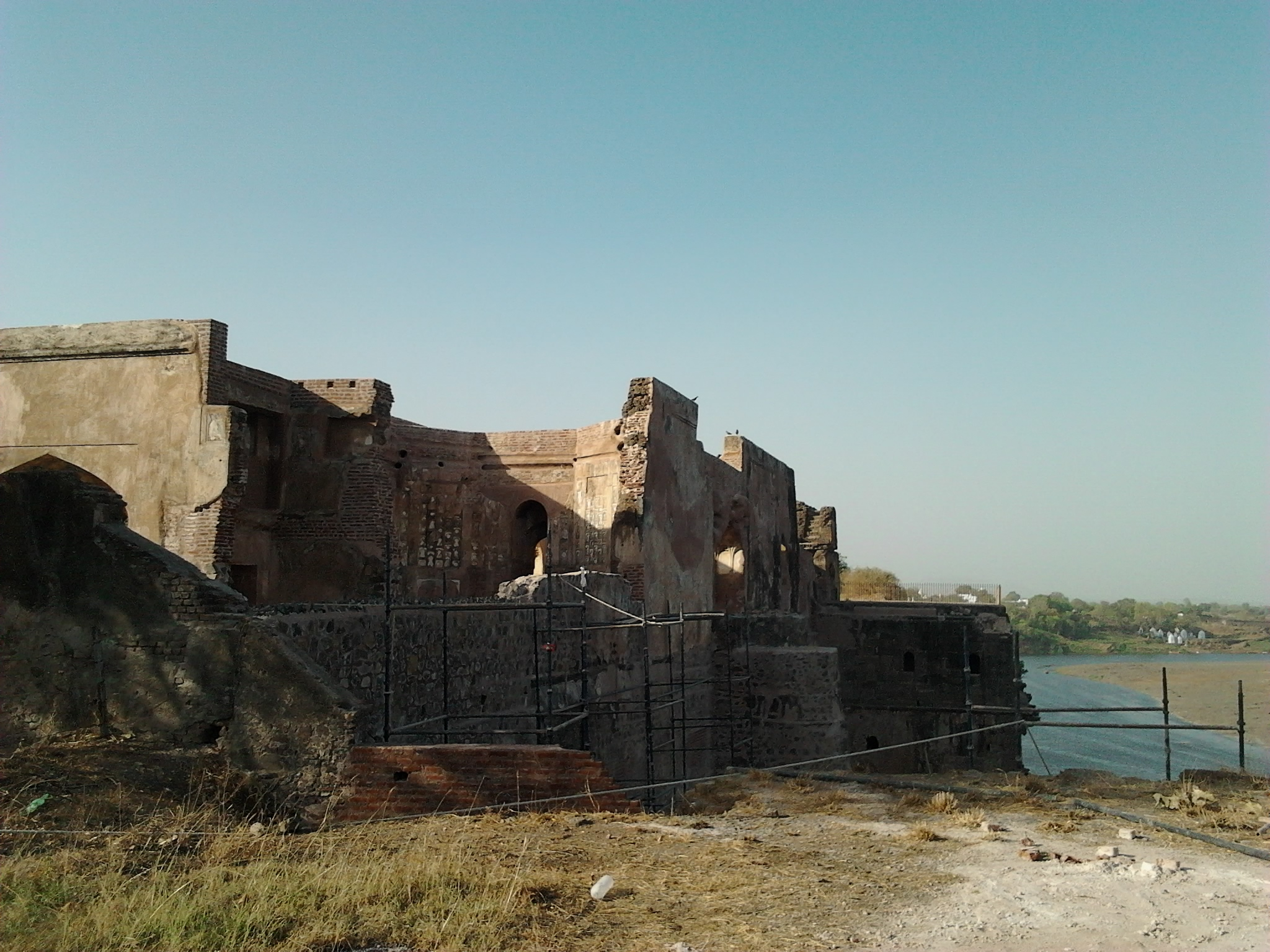
Shahi qila on the bank of Tapti river

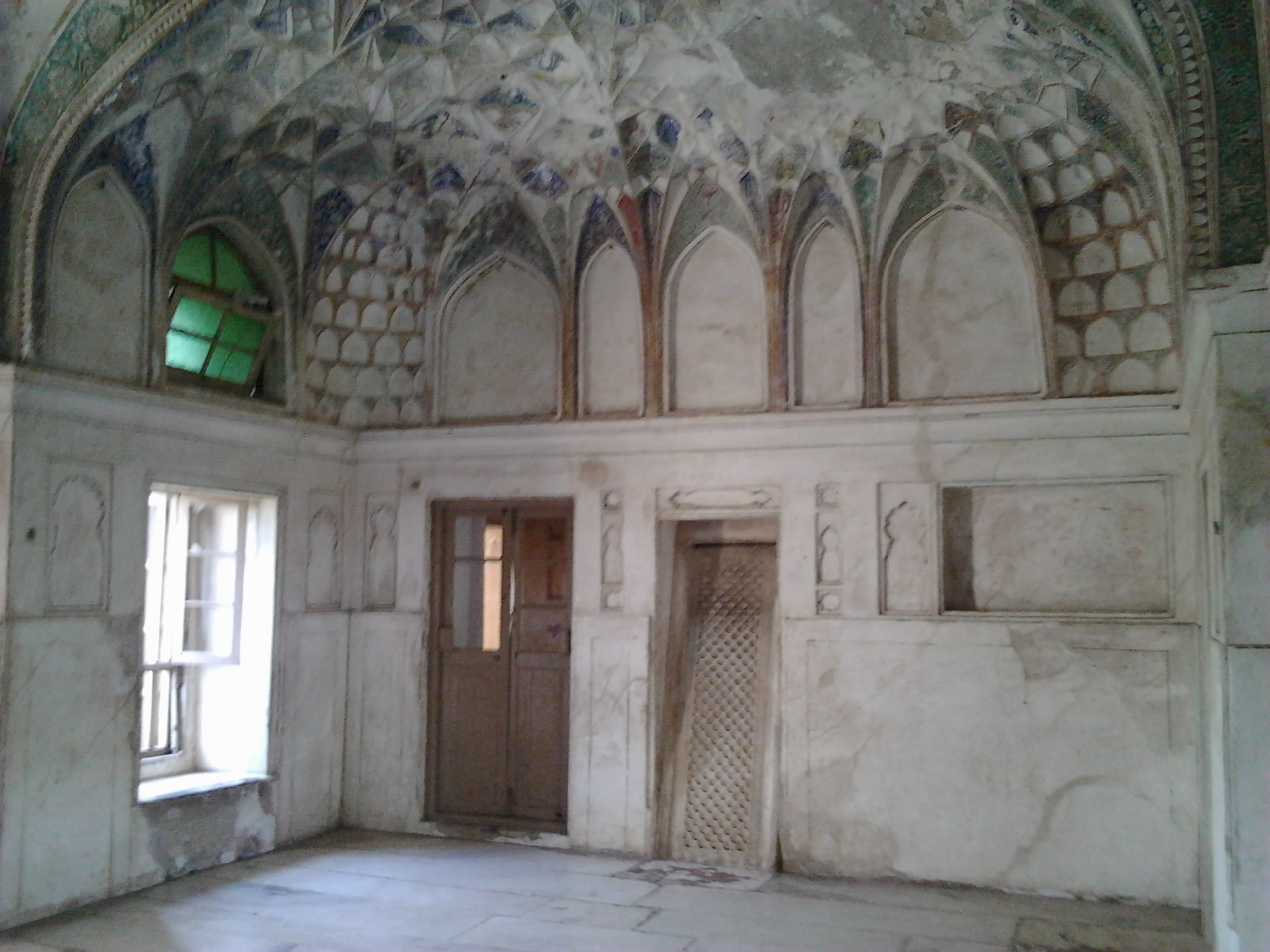
Royal bath or hammam Shahi qila Burhanpur

History of the Shahi Qila states that it was originally built by the Farooqui rulers and resided by Shah Jahan, at a time when he was the governor of Burhanpur. Shah Jahan became so fond of the fort that it was here, in Shahi Qila that he establishes his court for the first three years of his ascending the throne. Shah Jahan spent a considerable time in this city, and helped add to the Shahi Qila. Diwan-i-Aam and Diwan-i-Khas were built on the terrace of the Qila.

The Shahi Qila, Burhanpur is mostly in ruins now, except a few beautifully carved parts of the palace that still stands as a symbol of the glorious Qila it was in the olden days. The locals call the Shahi Qila 'Bhulbhulaya' (that means a labyrinth) because the architecture of the Shahi Qila is puzzling and perplexing for a casual visitor.

The main attraction at the palace is the hamam or the royal bath. It was specifically built for Shah Jahan's wife, Begum Mumtaz Mahal, so that she could enjoy a luxurious bath in water scented with khus, saffron and rose petals. Hammam Khana was constructed during Mughal Period. The baths bear an inscription of Khan Khana Mirza Abdul Rahim Khana, the famous minister of Akbar and Jahangir. The rooms have domed roof. Hot water used to flow from left wall whereas cold water from the right wall. The Hammam is beautifully decorated with paintings on honey comb work. Even today, the ceiling has many intricate paintings. One of these paintings depicts a monument which is said to have been the inspiration for the Taj Mahal. One of the amazing facts is that the Taj Mahal was originally supposed to have been built at Burhanpur. The site(Ahu-Khana) chosen for it still lies vacant near the tapti river. Mumtaz, in whose memory the Taj Mahal was built, died in burhanpur while giving birth to her fourteenth child.

== Photo gallery ==
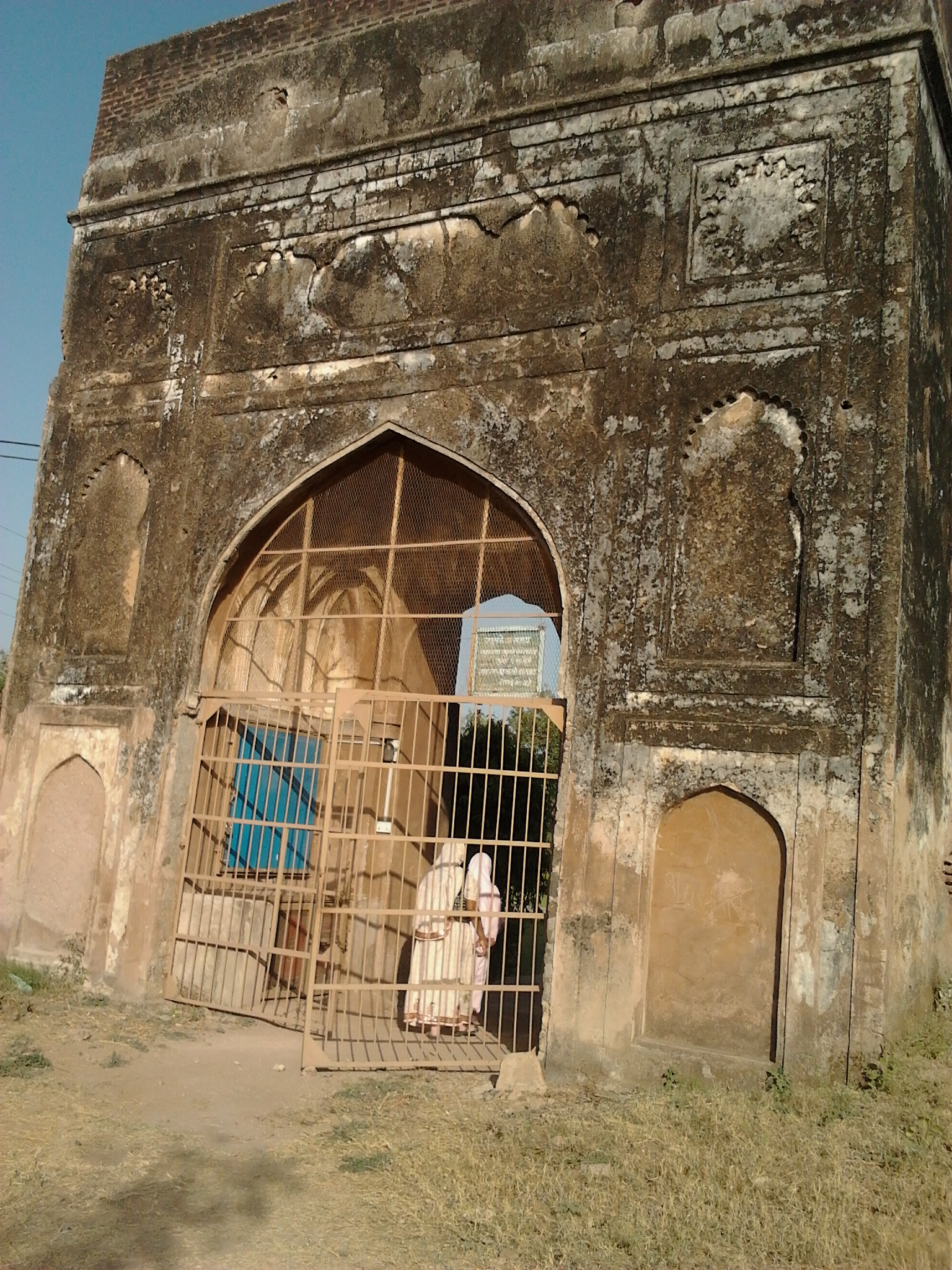
Main entrance

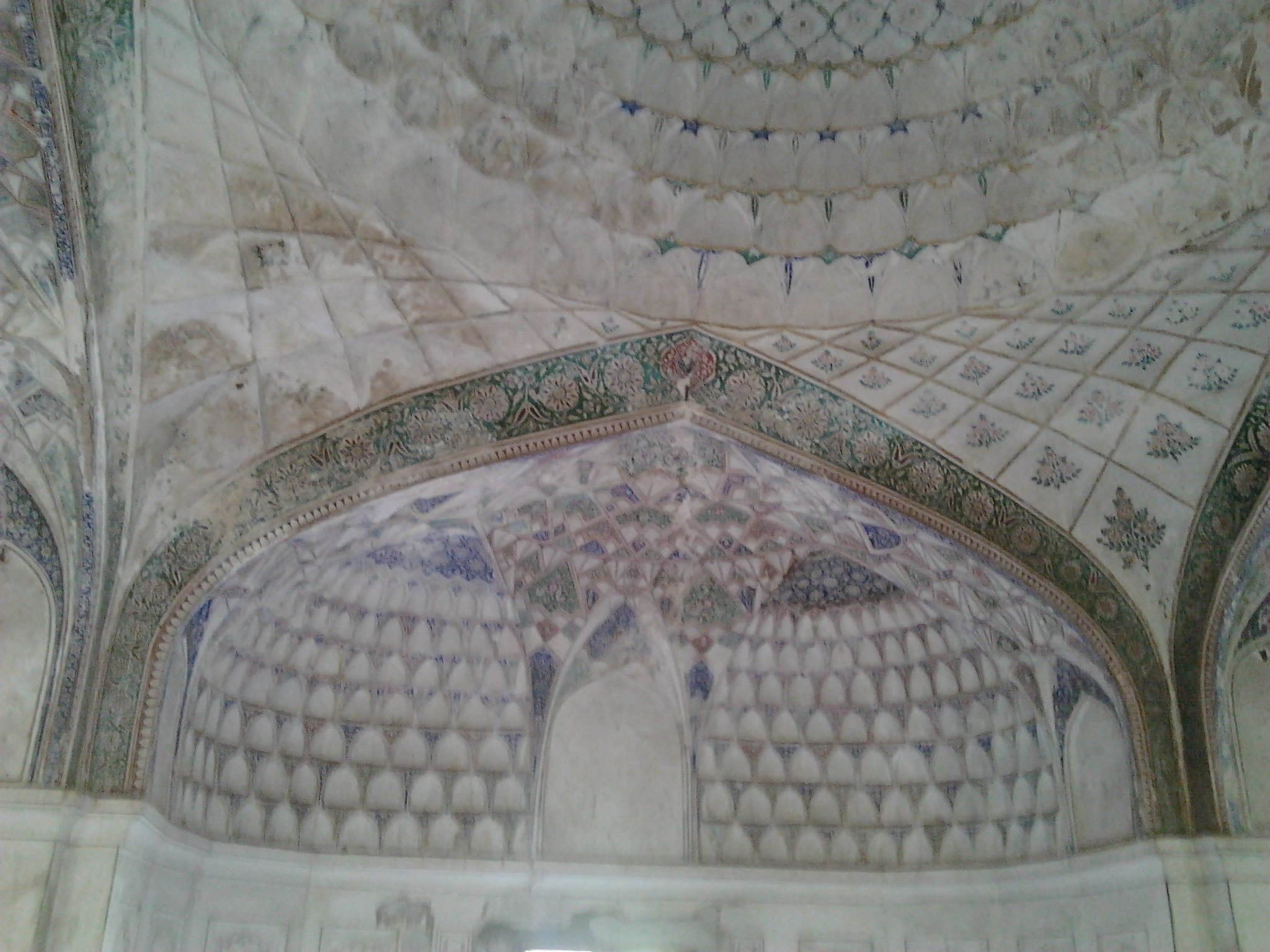
Carved painting Hammam

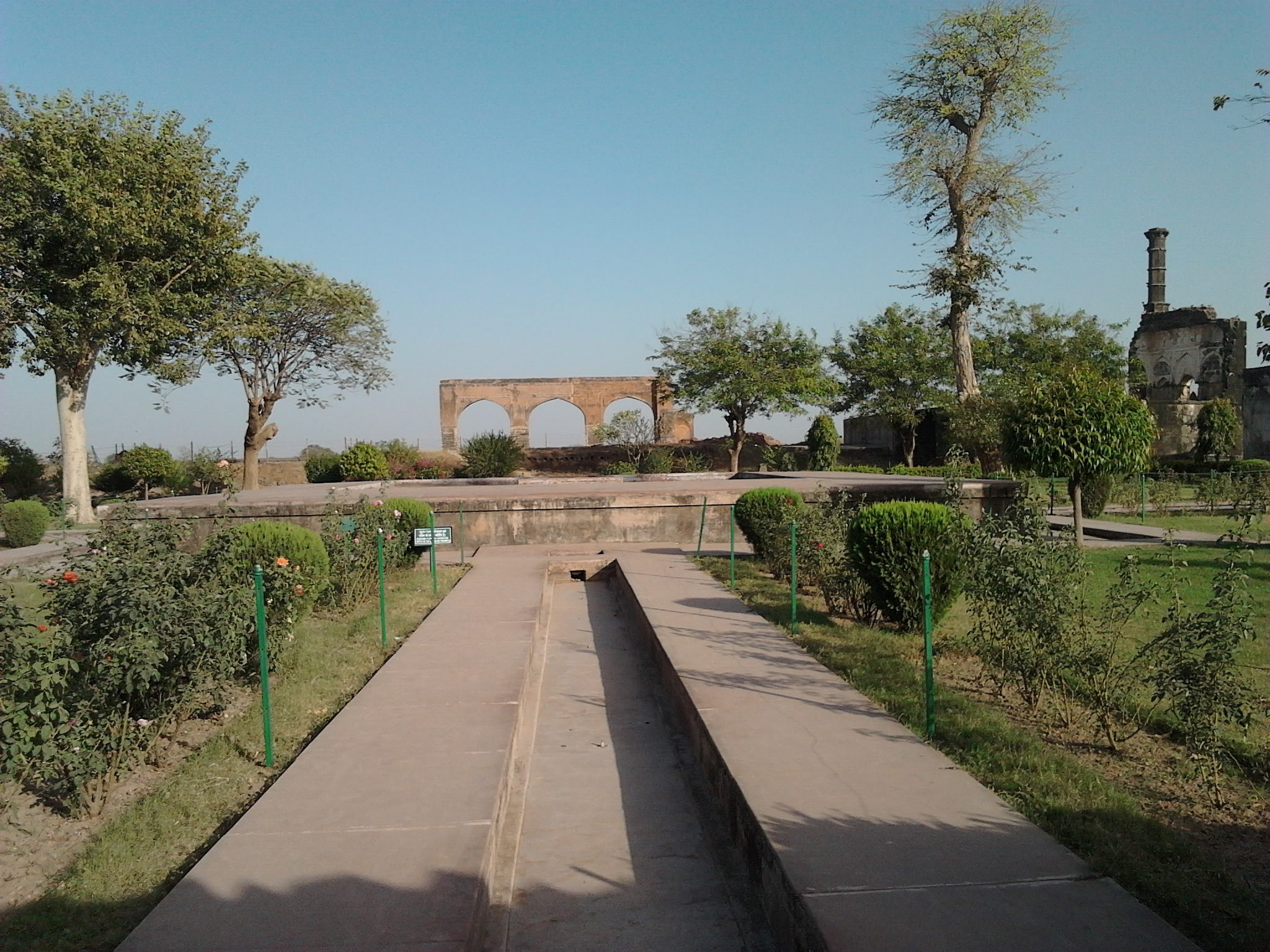
Fountains Shahi Qila

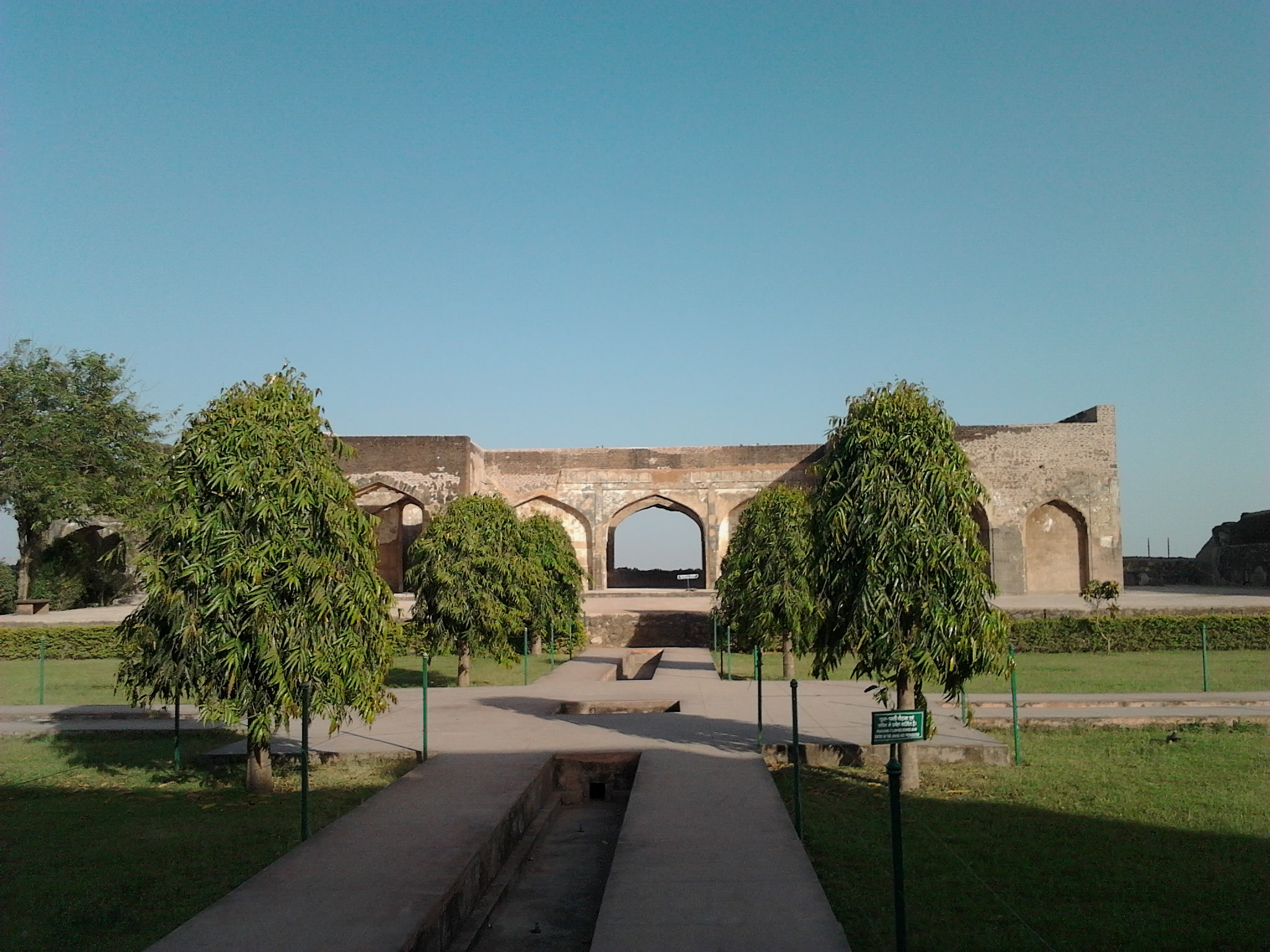
Diwan e khas

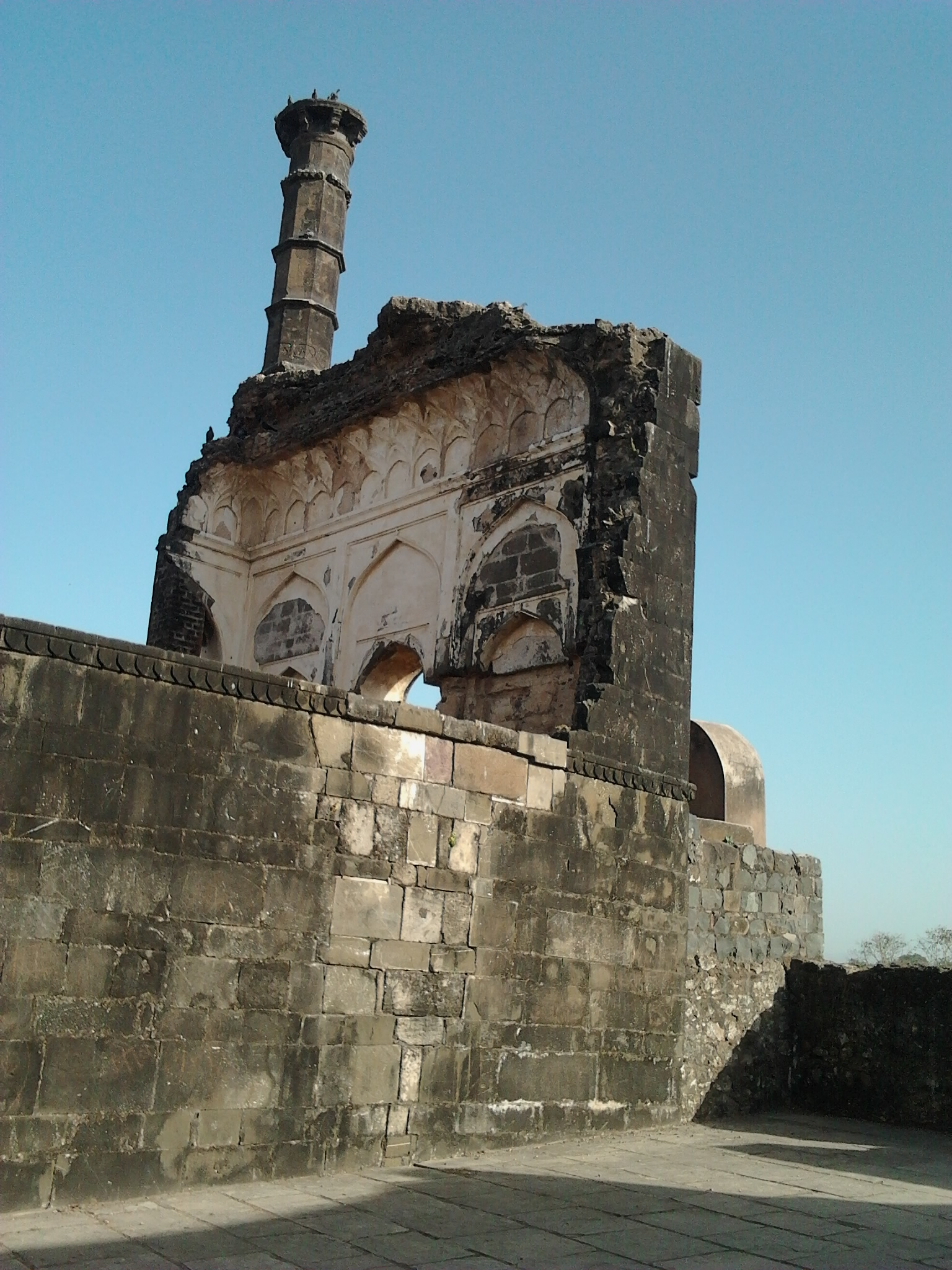
Mosque Shahi Qila
