= Zubdat-un-Nissa Begum =

Mughal princess (1651–1707)

- Shahzadi of the Mughal Empire
- Born: 2 September 1651; Multan, Mughal Empire (present day Multan, Pakistan)
- Died: 17 February 1707 (aged 55); Delhi, India
- Spouse: Sipihr Shikoh (m. 1673)
- Issue: Ali Tabar Mirza
- House: Timurid
- Father: Aurangzeb
- Mother: Dilras Banu Begum
- Religion: Sunni Islam

Zubdat-un-Nissa Begum (Persian: زبدة النساء بیگم, Zubdat-an-Nisāʾ Bigam; 2 September 1651 – 17 February 1707) was a Mughal princess, the third daughter of Emperor Aurangzeb and his wife Dilras Banu Begum.

== Life ==
Zubdat-un-Nissa was born on 2 September 1651 in Multan. Her father Aurangzeb was then a prince. A well-read woman, Zubdat-un-Nissa had in-depth knowledge of the doctrines of Islam.

Zubdat-un-Nissa married her first cousin, Prince Sipihr Shikoh on 30 January 1673, he was the third son of her paternal uncle, Crown Prince Dara Shikoh and her aunt Nadira Banu Begum. She was given a marriage portion of 400,000 rupees. A certain Hamida Banu Begam arranged the marriage feast. In 1676, Zubdat gave birth to a son, Shahzada Ali Tabar, who died within six months of his birth.

She died on 17 February 1707, less than a month before her father.

== Ancestry ==
Ancestors of Zubdat-un-Nissa Begum

16. Jalal-ud-din Muhammad Akbar, Mughal Emperor
8. Nur-ud-din Muhammad Jahangir, Mughal Emperor
17. Mariam-uz-Zamani
4. Shahab-ud-din Muhammad Shah Jahan I, Mughal Emperor
18. Udai Singh, Raja of Marwar
9. Jagat Gosain
19. Manrang Devi of Gwalior
2. Muhi-ud-din Muhammad Aurangzeb, Mughal Emperor
20. I'timad-ud-Daulah (= 28)
10. Abu'l-Hasan Asaf Khan
21. Asmat Begam (= 29)
5. Mumtaz Mahal
22. Ghias ud-din ‘Ali Asaf Khan
11. Diwanji Begum
1. Zubdat-un-Nissa
24. Sultan Hussain Safawi
12. Mirza Rustam Safavi
6. Mirza Badi-uz-Zaman Safavi
3. Dilras Banu Begum
28. I'timad-ud-Daulah (= 20)
14. Mirza Muhammad Sharif
29. Asmat Begam (= 21)
7. Nauras Banu Begum
