= Asmat Begum =

Persian noblewoman (d. 1621)

- Died: 1621; Agra, India
- Burial: Tomb of I'timād-ud-Daulah, Agra
- Spouse: Mirza Ghias Beg
- Issue: Muhammad Sharif; Shapur Itiqad Khan; Abu'l-Hasan Asaf Khan; Nur Jahan; Manija Begum; Khadija Begum
- Father: Mirza Ala-ud-Daula Aqa Mulla
- Religion: Shia Islam

Asmat Begum (Persian: عصمت بیگم; died 1621) was the wife of Mirza Ghiyas Beg, the Prime minister of the Mughal emperor Jahangir, and the mother of Mughal empress Nur Jahan, the power behind the emperor. Asmat Begum was also the paternal grandmother of Empress Mumtaz Mahal, for whom the Taj Mahal was built.

== Family ==
Asmat Begum was the daughter of Mirza Ala-ud-Daula Aqa Mulla and a member of the illustrious Aqa Mulla clan. She was a wise, well-educated, accomplished and highly cultured lady. She had a brother, Ibrahim Khan Fath-i-Jang, who served as the governor of Bengal during Emperor Jahangir's reign.

== Marriage ==
Asmat Begum was married to the Persian noble, Mirza Ghiyas Beg, the youngest son of Khvajeh Mohammad-Sharif, a Persian noble of Tehran and a vizier to the governor of Khorasan. The couple had seven children together: Muhammad Sharif, Shapur Itiqad Khan, Abu'l-Hasan Asaf Khan, Manija Begum (wife of Mir Qasim known as Qasim Khan Juvayni), Khadija Begum (wife of Hakim Beg later Hakim Khan), Mihr-un-Nissa Begum (later Empress Nur Jahan), and another daughter married to Sadiq Khan.

For unknown reasons, Ghias Beg and his family had suffered a reversal in fortune in 1576 and soon found circumstances intolerable in their homeland of Persia. Drawn to the favourable climate of Emperor Akbar's court in Agra, the family decided to migrate to India. Ghias Beg became a trusted minister under both Akbar and his son Jahangir and was awarded the title of 'I'timad-ud-Daulah' ("Pillar of the State") for his services.

However, while serving as the diwan to an amir-ul-umara in 1607, Ghias Beg was charged with embezzling Rs. 50,000, which led to a decrease in his rank and status at court. In 1611, Asmat Begum's second daughter, Mehr-un-Nissa, caught the eye of the reigning emperor Jahangir at the palace Meena Bazaar. The emperor proposed immediately and they were married within the same year. This marriage again led to a dramatic rise in the fortunes of Asmat Begum and Ghias Beg's family. Ghias Beg was given a substantial increase in mansab and made wazir of the whole dominion in 1611. Likewise, their sons Asaf Khan and Itiqad Khan were also given high positions and mansabs in the empire.

== Political role at the Mughal court ==
Mehr-un-Nissa (titled 'Nur Jahan' after her marriage) became Jahangir's most beloved and influential wife and soon became the real power behind the throne after their marriage. Nur Jahan formed a faction known as the junta which comprised her family members and her step-son, Prince Khurram (the future emperor Shah Jahan). This faction, led by Nur Jahan, took control of the government as Jahangir became increasingly addicted to opium and alcohol.

Asmat Begum, who was a wise and patient counsel in her own right, must certainly have been the nurturing hub of the junta in its heyday. She is also known to have taken a politically active role in the affairs of the court and served as a mother-figure to Jahangir and a counselor to Nur Jahan. However, Asmat Begum is perhaps best known for having invented the famous rose perfume called Jahangiri-itr, which was described by Jahangir as the discovery of his reign.

== Death ==
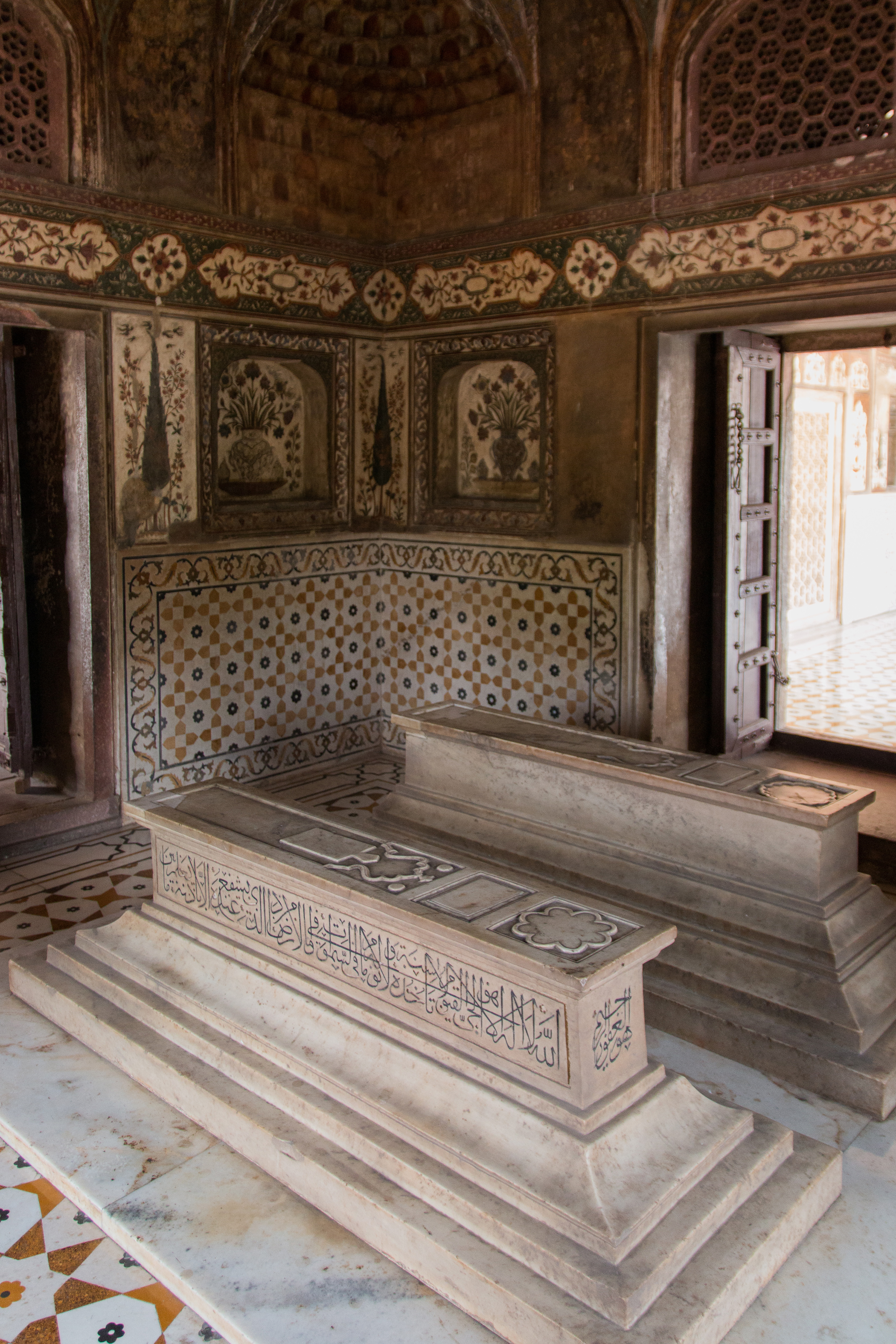
Cenotaph of Asmat Begum alongside that of her husband Mirza Ghias Beg.

Asmat Begum died in October 1621 in Agra. Upon her death, her son-in-law Jahangir, who was extremely fond of her, wrote: "Without exaggeration, in purity of disposition and in wisdom and the excellencies that are the ornament of women no Mother of the Age was ever born equal to her, and I did not value her less than my own mother."

Asmat Begum's death was a great blow to her family. Heartbroken over his wife's death, Ghias Beg also died a few months later in January 1622. Asmat Begum and her husband were buried in the same mausoleum, the Tomb of I'timād-ud-Daulah in Agra, which was commissioned by her daughter Nur Jahan, for both of her parents. Nur Jahan, who was extremely devoted to her parents, spent large sums on its construction.

== In popular culture ==
- Asmat Begum is a character in Usha John's novel The Unknown Lover and Other Short Stories (1961).
- Asmat Begum is a principal character in Indu Sundaresan's award-winning historical novel The Twentieth Wife (2002) as well as in its sequel The Feast of Roses (2003).
- Asmat Begum is a pivotal character in Tanushree Podder's historical novel Nur Jahan's Daughter (2005).
- Suparna Marwah portrayed Asmat Begum in EPIC drama Siyaasat

== Bibliography ==
- Banks Findley, Ellison (11 February 1993). Nur Jahan: Empress of Mughal India. Oxford, UK: Nur Jahan : Empress of Mughal India. ISBN 9780195074888.
