= Mumtaz Mahal =

Empress of the Mughal Empire from 1628 to 1631

- Empress consort of the Mughal Empire
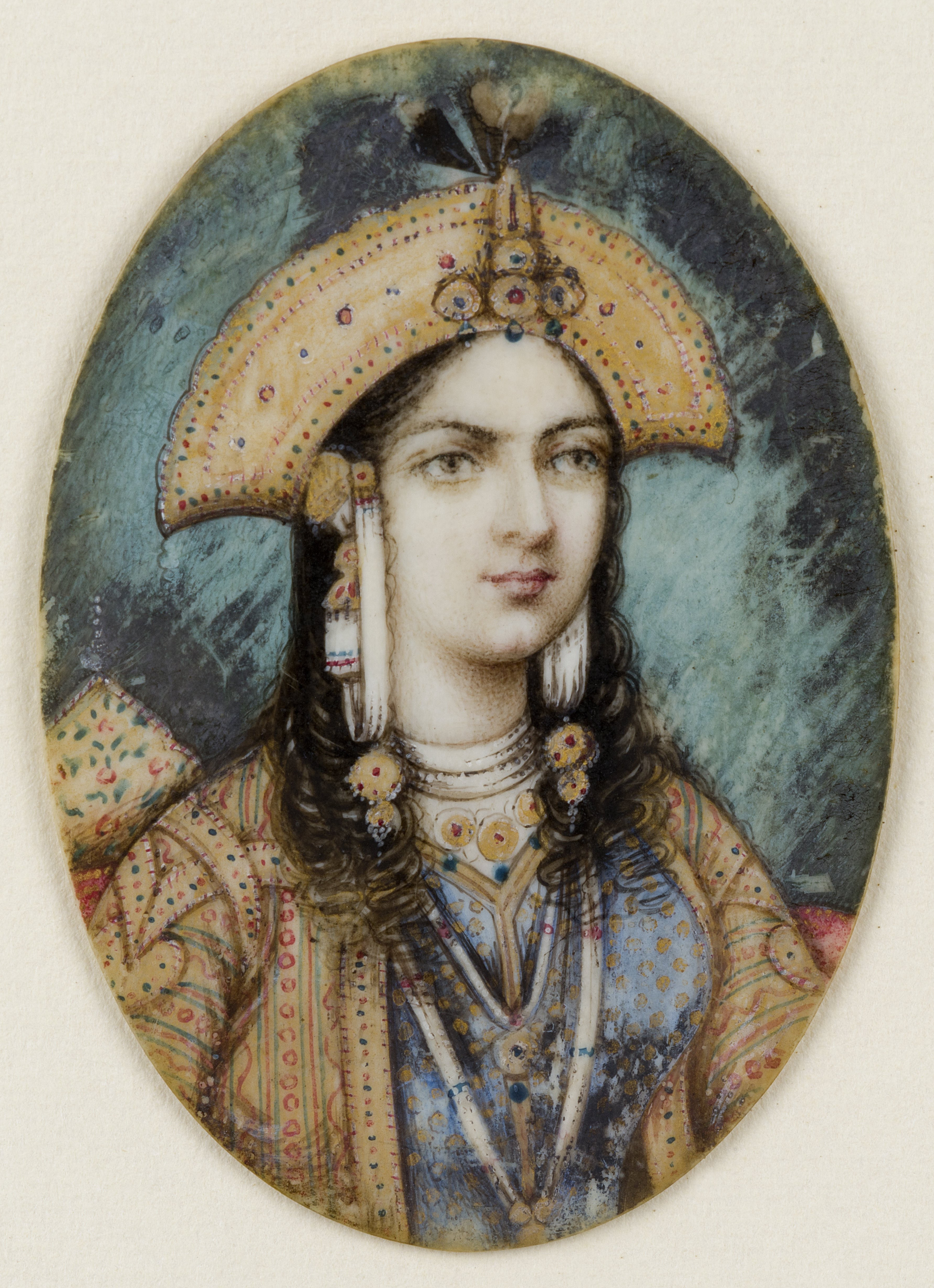
- Portrait of Mumtaz Mahal on ivory, 17th‑century, held at the Lahore Museum in Lahore, Pakistan

Padshah Begum
- Tenure: 19 January 1628 – 17 June 1631
- Predecessor: Nur Jahan
- Successor: Jahanara Begum
- Born: Arjumand Banu Begum; 27 April 1593; Agra, Mughal Empire, now Uttar Pradesh, India
- Died: 17 June 1631 (aged 38); Burhanpur, Mughal Empire, now Madhya Pradesh, India
- Burial: Taj Mahal, Agra, Uttar Pradesh, India
- Spouse: Shah Jahan (m. 1612)
- Issue Detail: Hur-ul-Nisa Begum; Jahanara Begum; Dara Shikoh; Shah Shuja; Roshanara Begum; Aurangzeb; Murad Bakhsh; Gauhar Ara Begum
- House: Timurid (by marriage)
- Father: Abu'l-Hasan Asaf Khan
- Mother: Diwanji Begum
- Religion: Shia Islam

Mumtaz Mahal (Persian pronunciation: [mum.ˈtɑːz ma.ˈhal]; lit. 'The Exalted One of the Palace'; born Arjumand Banu Begum; 27 April 1593 – 17 June 1631) was the empress of the Mughal Empire from 1628 to 1631 as the chief consort of the fifth Mughal emperor, Shah Jahan. The Taj Mahal in Agra, often cited as one of the Wonders of the World, was commissioned by her husband to act as her tomb.

Mumtaz Mahal was born as Arjumand Banu Begum in Agra to a family of Persian nobility. She was the daughter of Abu'l-Hasan Asaf Khan, a wealthy noble who held high office in the Mughal Empire, and the niece of Nur Jahan, the chief consort of Emperor Jahangir and the power behind the emperor. Arjumand Banu was married at the age of 19 on 10 May 1612 or 16 June 1612 to Prince Khurram, later known by his regnal name Shah Jahan, who conferred upon her the title "Mumtaz Mahal" (lit. 'The Exalted One of the Palace'). Although betrothed to Shah Jahan since 1607, she ultimately became his second wife in 1612. Mumtaz and her husband had 14 children, including Jahanara Begum (Shah Jahan's favorite daughter) and Dara Shikoh (Shah Jahan's chosen heir apparent, who was defeated in the war of succession by his parents' third son, Aurangzeb, who ultimately became the sixth Mughal emperor in 1658).

Mumtaz Mahal died in 1631 in Burhanpur, Deccan (present-day Madhya Pradesh) during the birth of her 14th child, a daughter named Gauhar Ara Begum. Shah Jahan had the Taj Mahal built as a tomb for her, which is considered to be a monument of undying love. As with other Mughal imperial ladies, no contemporary likenesses of her are accepted, but imagined portraits were created from the 19th century onwards.

== Family and early life ==
Mumtaz Mahal was born as Arjumand Banu on 27 April 1593 in Agra to Abu'l-Hasan Asaf Khan and his wife Diwanji Begum, the daughter of a Persian noble, Khwaja Ghias-ud-din of Qazvin. Asaf Khan was a wealthy Persian noble who held high office in the Mughal Empire. His family had come to India impoverished in 1577, when his father Mirza Ghias Beg (popularly known by his title of I'timad-ud-Daulah), was taken into the service of Emperor Akbar in Agra.

Asaf Khan was also the older brother of Empress Nur Jahan, making Mumtaz a niece, and later, a step daughter-in-law of Nur Jahan, the chief consort of Emperor Jahangir, Shah Jahan's father. Her older sister, Parwar Khanum, married Sheikh Farid, the son of Nawab Qutubuddin Koka, the governor of Badaun, who was also the emperor Jahangir's foster brother. Mumtaz also had a brother, Shaista Khan, who served as the governor of Bengal and various other provinces in the empire during Shah Jahan's reign.

Mumtaz was remarkable in the field of learning and was a talented and cultured lady. She was well-versed in Arabic and Persian, and could compose poems in the latter. She was reputed to have a combination of modesty and candor, a woman warmly straightforward yet bemusedly self-possessed. Early in adolescence, she attracted the attention of important nobles of the realm. Jahangir must have heard about her, since he readily consented to Shah Jahan's engagement with her.

== Marriage ==
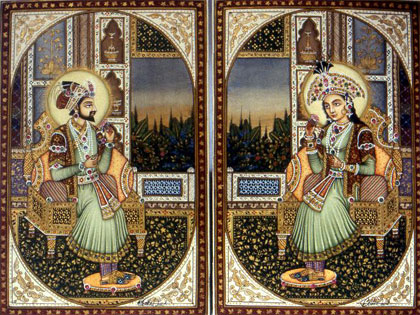
Posthumous painting of Shah Jahan and Mumtaz Mahal

Mumtaz Mahal was betrothed to Shah Jahan around 5 April 1607, when she was 14 years old and he was 15. They were, however, married five years after their betrothal on 10 May 1612 or 7 June 1612 in Agra. After their wedding celebrations, Shah Jahan, "finding her in appearance and character elect among all the women of the time", gave her the title Mumtaz Mahal (Persian: ممتاز محل, lit. 'the exalted one of the Palace'). During the intervening years between their betrothal and marriage, Shah Jahan had married his first wife, Princess Kandahari Begum in 1610 and in 1617, after marrying Mumtaz, took a third wife, Izz-un-Nissa Begum (titled Akbarabadi Mahal), the daughter of a prominent Mughal courtier. According to the official court historians, both the marriages were political alliances.

By all accounts, Shah Jahan was so taken with Mumtaz that he showed little interest in exercising his polygamous rights with his two other wives, other than dutifully siring a child with each. According to the official court chronicler, Motamid Khan, as recorded in his Iqbal Namah-e-Jahangiri, the relationship with his other wives "had nothing more than the status of marriage. The intimacy, deep affection, attention and favour which Shah Jahan had for Mumtaz exceeded what he felt for his other wives." Likewise, Shah Jahan's historian Inayat Khan commented that 'his whole delight was centered on this illustrious lady [Mumtaz], to such an extent that he did not feel towards the others [i.e. his other wives] one-thousandth part of the affection that he did for her.'

Mumtaz had a loving marriage with Shah Jahan. Even during her lifetime, poets would extol her beauty, grace, and compassion. Despite her frequent pregnancies, Mumtaz travelled with Shah Jahan's entourage throughout his earlier military campaigns and the subsequent rebellion against his father. She was his constant companion and trusted confidant, leading court historians to go to unheard lengths to document the intimate and erotic relationship the couple enjoyed. In their 19 years of marriage, they had 14 children together (eight sons and six daughters), seven of whom died at birth or at a very young age.

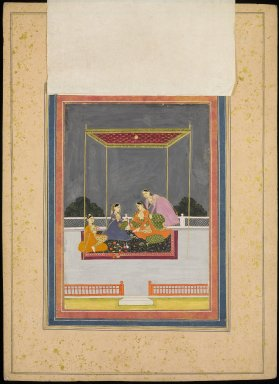
A painting of a Mughal Harem, likely depicting Mumtaz Mahal. c. 17th century

== Mughal empress ==
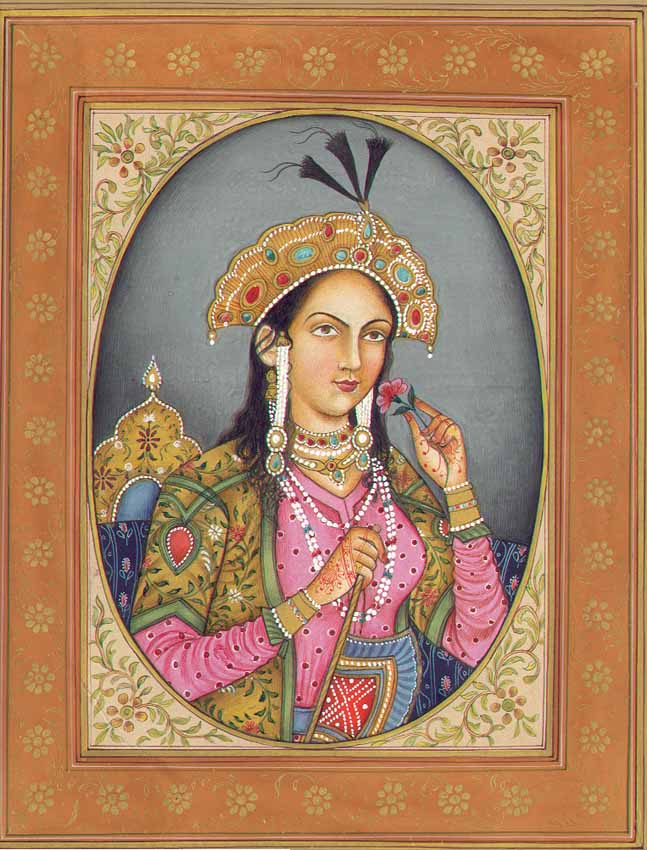
17th-18th century portrait of Mumtaz Mahal.

Upon his accession to the throne in 1628 after subduing his half-brother, Shahryar Mirza, Shah Jahan designated Mumtaz as his chief empress with the title of Padshah Begum '(First Lady or Queen of the Great)', 'Malika-i-Jahan' ("Queen of the World") and 'Malika-uz-Zamani' ("Queen of the Age") and 'Malika-i-Hindustan ("Queen of the Hindustan"). Mumtaz's tenure as empress was brief, spanning only three years due to her untimely death. Nonetheless, Shah Jahan bestowed her with magnanimous luxuries. She was also the only wife of Shah Jahan to be addressed as "Hazrat" being the mother of the heir apparent. For example, no other empress' residence was as decorated as Khas Mahal (part of Agra Fort), where Mumtaz lived with Shah Jahan. It was decorated with pure gold and precious stones and had rose-water fountains of its own. Each wife of the Mughal emperor was given a regular monthly allowance for her gastos (housekeeping or travelling expenses); the highest such allowance on record is the one million rupees per year given to Mumtaz Mahal by Shah Jahan. Apart from this income, he gave her a lot of high-income lands and properties.

Shah Jahan consulted Mumtaz in both private matters and the affairs of the state, and she served as his close confidant and trusted adviser and because of this, she had enormous political power. Mumtaz sat next to the emperor in the Hall of Private Audience and Hall of Public Audience. She was hidden behind a curtain; if she did not agree with something, she would place her hand on his back, out of sight. At her intercession, he forgave enemies or commuted death sentences. His trust in her was so great that he gave her the highest honour of the land – his imperial seal, the Mehr Uzaz, which validated imperial decrees and nothing could be done without her consent. Mumtaz was portrayed as having no aspirations to political power, in contrast to her aunt, Nur Jahan, the chief consort of Emperor Jahangir, who had wielded enormous power and considerable influence during Jahangir’s reign.

An uncontested and great influence on him, often intervening on behalf of the poor and destitute, she also enjoyed watching elephant and combat fights performed for the court. Mumtaz also patronized a number of poets, scholars and other talented persons. A noted Sanskrit poet, Vansidhara Mishra, was the Empress's favorite. On the recommendation of her principal lady-in-waiting, Sati-un-Nissa, Mumtaz Mahal provided pensions and donations to the daughters of poor scholars, theologians, and pious men. It was quite common for women of noble birth to commission architecture in the Mughal Empire, so Mumtaz devoted some time to a riverside garden in Agra, which is now known as Zahara Bagh. It is the only architectural foundation that can be connected to her patronage.

== Death and aftermath ==
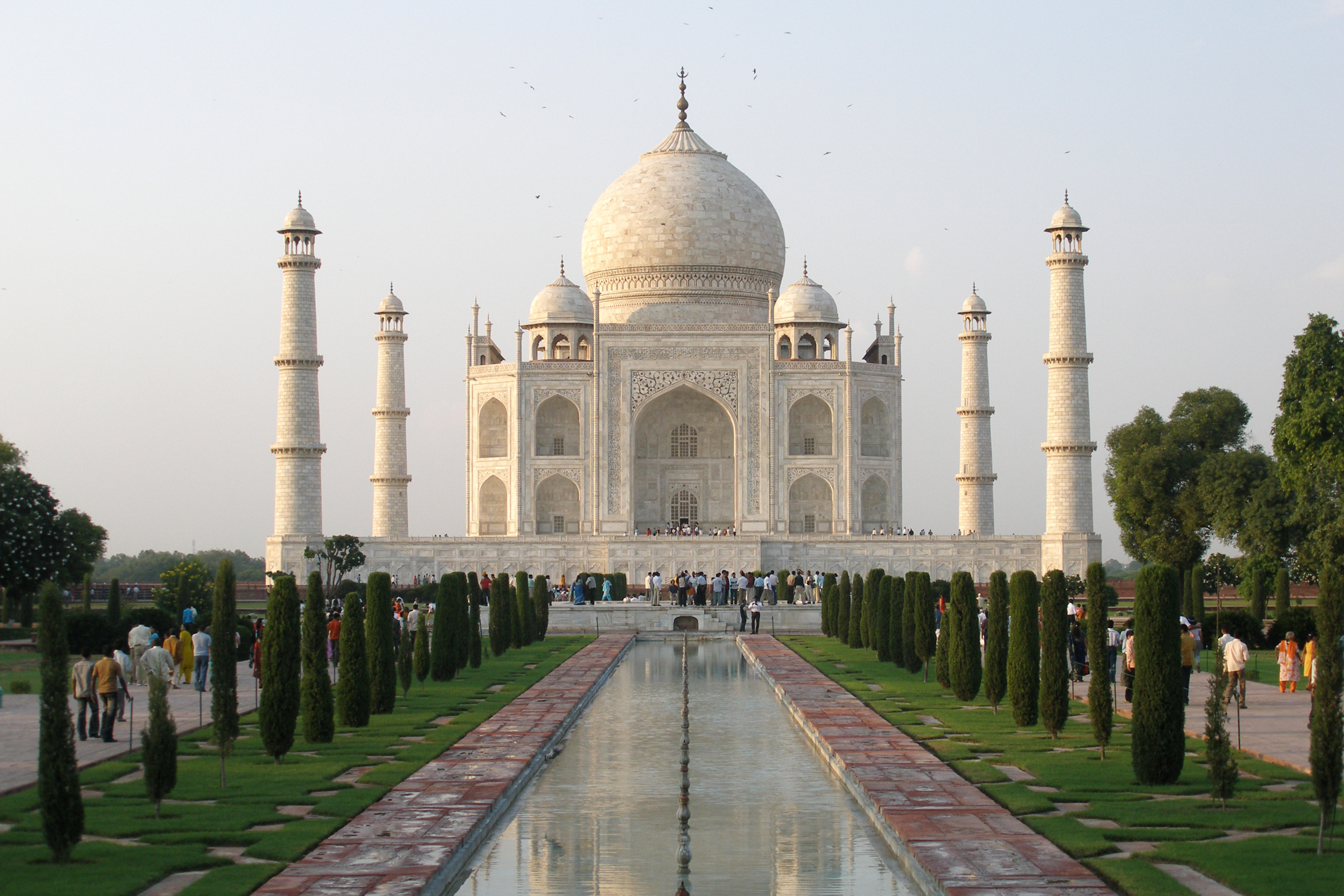
A UNESCO World Heritage Site, the Taj Mahal is the final resting place of Mumtaz Mahal and Shah Jahan.

Mumtaz Mahal died from postpartum hemorrhage in Burhanpur on 17 June 1631 while giving birth to her 14th child, after a prolonged labor of around 30 hours. She had been accompanying her husband while he was fighting a campaign in the Deccan Plateau. Her body was temporarily buried at Burhanpur in a walled pleasure garden known as Zainabad originally constructed by Shah Jahan's uncle Daniyal on the bank of the Tapti River. The contemporary court chroniclers paid an unusual amount of attention to Mumtaz Mahal's death and Shah Jahan's grief at her demise. In the immediate aftermath of his bereavement, the emperor was reportedly inconsolable. Apparently, after her death, he went into secluded mourning for a year. When he appeared again, his hair had turned white, his back was bent, and his face worn. Mumtaz's eldest daughter, Jahanara Begum, gradually brought her father out of grief and took her mother's place at court.

Mumtaz Mahal's personal fortune (valued at 10 million rupees) was divided by Shah Jahan among Jahanara Begum, who received half, and the rest of her surviving children. Burhanpur was never intended by her husband as his wife's final resting spot. As a result, her body was disinterred in December 1631 and transported in a golden casket escorted by her son Shah Shuja, the deceased empress's head lady-in-waiting, and the distinguished courtier Wazir Khan, back to Agra. There, it was interred in a small building on the banks of the Yamuna River. Shah Jahan stayed behind in Burhanpur to conclude the military campaign that had originally brought him to the region. While there, he began planning the design and construction of a suitable mausoleum and funerary garden in Agra for his wife. It was a task that would take 22 years to complete, the Taj Mahal.

=== Taj Mahal ===
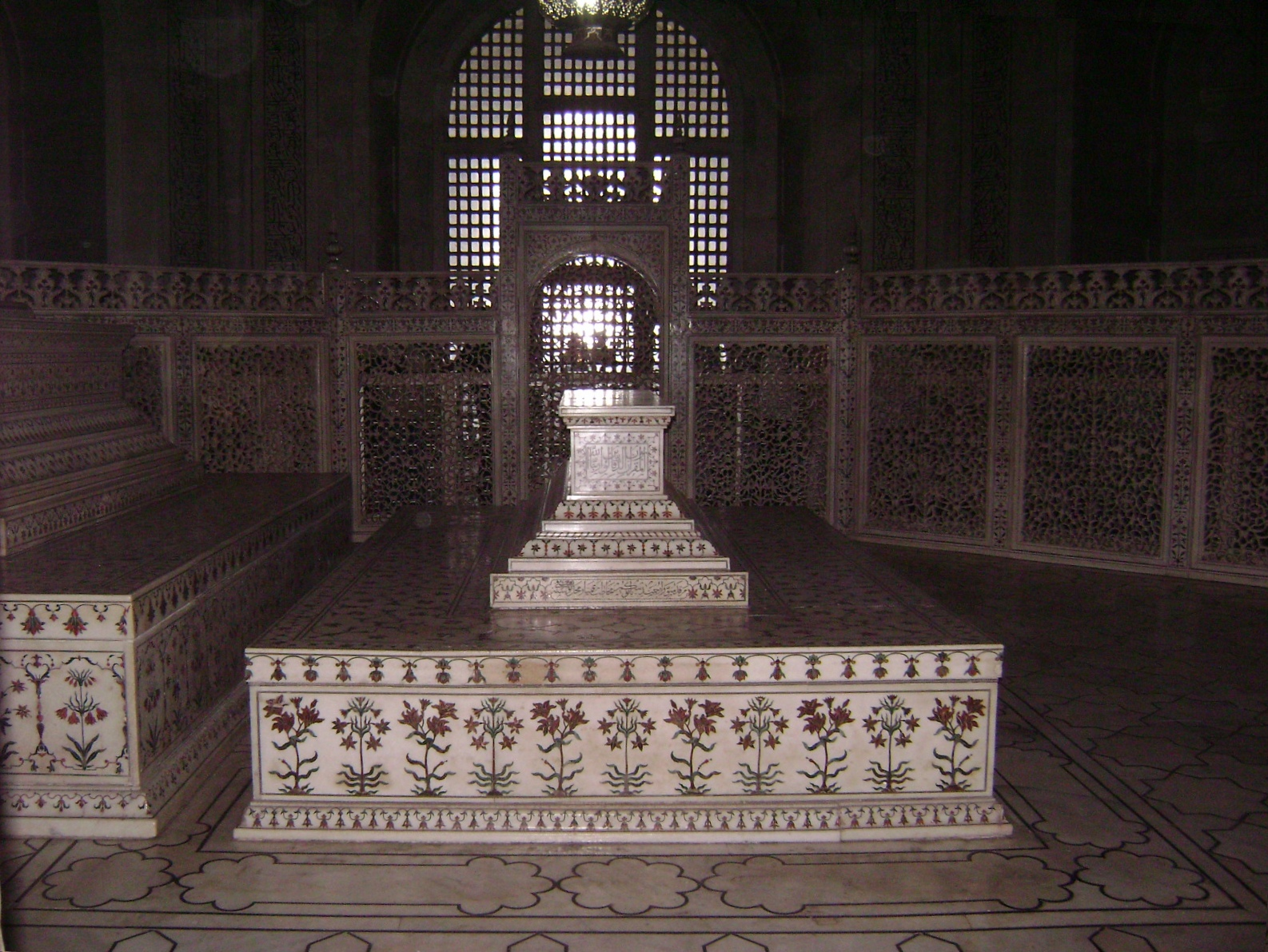
Cenotaph of Mumtaz Mahal

The Taj Mahal was commissioned by Shah Jahan to be built as a mausoleum for Mumtaz Mahal. It is seen as an embodiment of undying love and marital devotion. English poet Sir Edwin Arnold describes it as "Not a piece of architecture, as other buildings are, but the proud passion of an emperor's love wrought in living stones." The beauty of the monument is also taken as a representation of Mumtaz Mahal's beauty and this association leads many to describe the Taj Mahal as feminine. Since Muslim tradition forbids elaborate decorations on graves, the bodies of Mumtaz and Shah Jahan are placed in a relatively plain crypt beneath the inner chamber with their faces turned to the right and towards Mecca.

The Ninety Nine Names of God are found as calligraphic inscriptions on the sides of the tomb of Mumtaz Mahal in the crypt including, "O Noble, O Magnificent, O Majestic, O Unique, O Eternal, O Glorious...". There are many theories about the origin of the name of this tomb and one of them suggests that 'Taj' is an abbreviation of the name Mumtaz. European travelers, such as François Bernier, who observed its construction, were among the first to call it the Taj Mahal. Since they are unlikely to have come up with the name, they might have picked it up from the locals of Agra, who called the Empress 'Taj Mahal', and thought the tomb was named after her. Shah Jahan had not intended to entomb another person in the Taj Mahal; however, Aurangzeb had Shah Jahan buried next to the tomb of Mumtaz Mahal rather than build a separate tomb for his father. This is evident from the asymmetrical placement of Shah Jahan's grave on one side of his wife's grave which is in the centre.

== In popular culture ==
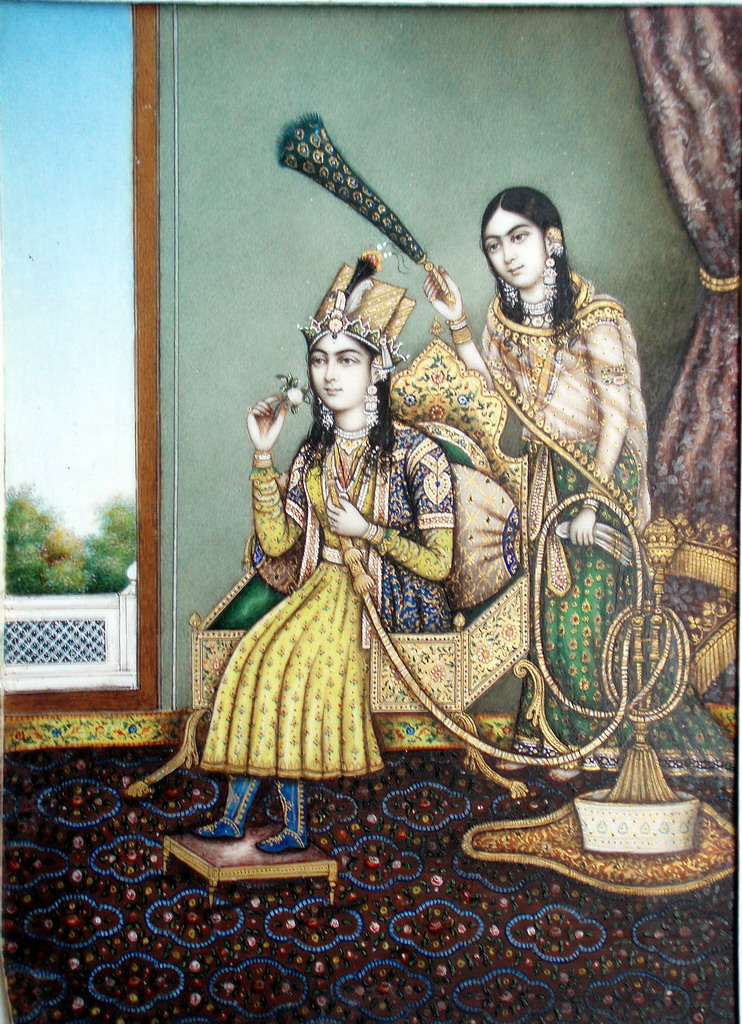
Mumtaz Mahal with attendant c.1860

=== Astronomy ===
- A crater was named in her honour on asteroid 433 Eros, along with another one after her husband.
- A crater on the planet Venus is named after her.

=== Literature ===
- A cat named after Mumtaz Mahal ("Princess Arjumand") plays a major role in Connie Willis's 1997 novel To Say Nothing of the Dog.
- Arjumand Banu (Mumtaz Mahal) is a principal character in Indu Sundaresan's novel The Feast of Roses (2003) and its sequel, Shadow Princess (2010), begins with her death.
- Mumtaz Mahal is a main character in Sonja Chandrachud's novel Trouble at the Taj (2011). She appears in the book as a ghost.
- In John Shors' novel Beneath a Marble Sky (2013), Mahal's daughter, Princess Jahanara, tells the extraordinary story of how the Taj Mahal came to be, describing her own life as an agent in its creation and as a witness to the fateful events surrounding its completion.
- Manahil Bandukwala's debut poetry collection Monument (2022) is a conversation with Mumtaz Mahal. It explores themes of love, monumentalisation, legacy, family, and empire.

=== Films ===
- Mumtaz Mahal is a 1926 Indian silent film by Homi Master.
- Actress Enakshi Rama Rau played the role of Mumtaz Mahal in Shiraz (1928).
- Mumtaz Mahal, a 1944 Indian film was based on her life.
- Actress Suraiya played the role of young Mumtaz Mahal in Nanubhai Vakil's film Taj Mahal (1941).
- Mumtaz Mahal was portrayed by actress Nasreen in Abdul Rashid Kardar's film Shahjehan (1946).
- Mumtaz Mahal is a 1957 Indian Hindi-language drama film by Ram Daryani, starring Veena in the titular role.
- Bina Rai portrayed Mumtaz Mahal in M. Sadiq's film Taj Mahal (1963).
- Achala Sachdev portrayed Mumtaz Mahal in Vinod Kumar's film Jahan Ara (1964).
- Zeba played the role of Mumtaz Mahal in S. T. Zaidi's Taj Mahal (1968).
- Shahzadi Mumtaz, an Indian film starring Asokan and Shakuntala released in 1977.
- Purnima Patwardhan portrayed her role in the 2003 Indian historical drama film, Taj Mahal: A Monument of Love.
- Sonya Jehan portrayed Mumtaz Mahal in Akbar Khan's film Taj Mahal: An Eternal Love Story (2005).
- In the 2014 historical drama series Siyaasat aired on The EPIC Channel, she is portrayed by Ashnoor Kaur.
- Suhani Juneja played the role of young Arjumand Banu Begum in the second season of the popular webseries Taj: Divided by Blood on Zee5.

=== Other ===
- Mumtaz Mahal was the inspiration behind the popular Guerlain perfume Shalimar (1921).

== Issue ==
Children of Mumtaz Mahal

Name	Portrait	Lifespan	Notes
Hur-ul-Nisa Begum		30 March 1613 – 5 June 1616	Died of smallpox at the age of 3.
Jahanara Begum; Padshah Begum		23 March 1614 – 16 September 1681	Shah Jahan's favourite and most influential daughter. Jahanara became the First Lady (Padshah Begum) of the Mughal Empire after her mother's death, despite the fact that her father had three other consorts. She died unmarried.
Dara Shikoh; Padshahzada-i-Buzurg Martaba, Jalal ul-Kadir, Sultan Muhammad Dara Shikoh, Shah-i-Buland Iqbal		20 March 1615 – 30 August 1659	The eldest son and heir-apparent. He was favoured as a successor by his father, Shah Jahan, and his elder sister, Princess Jahanara Begum, but was defeated and later killed by his younger brother, Prince Muhiuddin (later the Emperor Aurangzeb), in a bitter struggle for the imperial throne. He married and had issue.
Shah Shuja		23 June 1616 – 7 February 1661	He survived in the war of succession. He married and had issue.
Roshanara Begum; Padshah Begum		3 September 1617 – 11 September 1671	She was the most influential of Shah Jahan's daughters after Jahanara Begum and sided with Aurangzeb during the war of succession. She died unmarried.
Aurangzeb; Mughal emperor		3 November 1618 – 3 March 1707	Succeeded his father as the sixth Mughal emperor after emerging victorious in the war of succession that took place after Shah Jahan's illness in 1657. He married and had issue.
Izad Bakhsh		18 December 1619 – February/March 1621	Died in infancy.
Surayya Banu Begum		10 June 1621 – 28 April 1628	Died of smallpox at the age of 7.
Unnamed son		1622	Died soon after birth.
Murad Bakhsh		8 October 1624 – 14 December 1661	He was executed in 1661 as per Aurangzeb's orders. He married and had issue.
Lutf Allah		4 November 1626 – 13 May 1628	Died at the age of one and a half years.
Daulat Afza		8 May 1628 – 13 May 1629	Died in infancy.
Husn Ara Begum		23 April 1630 – 1631	Died in infancy.
Gauhar Ara Begum		17 June 1631 – 1706	Mumtaz died while giving birth to her on 17 June 1631 in Burhanpur. She died unmarried.

== Ancestry ==
Ancestors of Mumtaz Mahal

8. Khwaja Muhammad Sharif
4. I'timad-ud-Daulah
9. Unnamed wife (daughter of 12)
2. Abu'l-Hasan Asaf Khan
10. Ala-ud-Daula Aqa Mulla (son of 12)
5. Asmat Begam
1. Mumtaz Mahal
12. Aqa Mulla Dawatdar Qazwini
6. Ghiyas ud-din 'Ali Asaf Khan
3. Diwanji Begum

== Bibliography ==
- Koch, Ebba (2006). The Complete Taj Mahal: And the Riverfront Gardens of Agra (Hardback) (1st ed.). Thames & Hudson Ltd. pp. 288 pages. ISBN 0500342091.
- Preston, Diana & Michael (2007). A Teardrop on the Cheek of Time (Hardback) (1st ed.). London: Doubleday. pp. 354 pages. ISBN 978-0385609470.
- Tillotson, Giles (2008). Taj Mahal. Cambridge, MA: Harvard University Press. ISBN 978-0674063655.
- Banks Findley, Ellison (1993). Nur Jahan: Empress of Mughal India. Oxford, UK: Nur Jahan : Empress of Mughal India. ISBN 978-0195074888.
