= Shah Jahan =

Mughal emperor from 1628 to 1658

Shah Jahan I شاه جهان اول
- Sahib-i Qiran; Padishah; Ghazi; Al-Sultan Al-Azam; Shahanshah-i Hind (King of Kings of India)
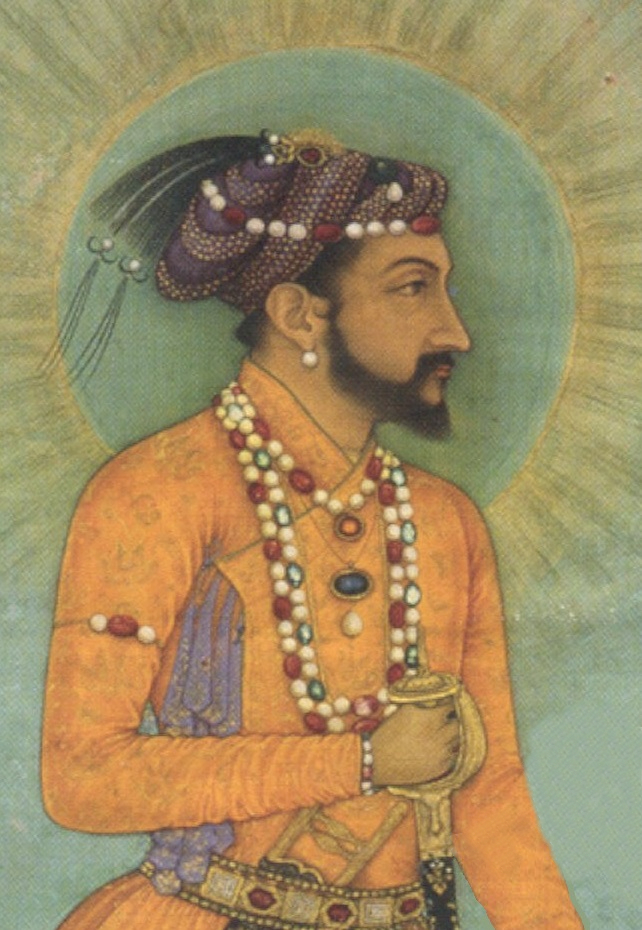
- Portrait by Bichitr, c. 1630

Mughal Emperor
- Reign: 19 January 1628 – 31 July 1658
- Coronation: 14 February 1628; Agra Fort
- Predecessor: Jahangir; Shahriyar (de facto)
- Successor: Alamgir I
- Grand Viziers: See list: Wazir Khan (1627–1628); Mir Baqir Iradat Khan (1628); Afzal Khan Shirazi (1628–1639); Islam Khan Mashadi (1639–1645); Sa'adullah Khan (1645–1656); Mir Jumla (1656–1657); Jafar Khan (1657–1658)
- Born: Khurram; 5 January 1592; Lahore, Lahore Subah, Mughal Empire
- Died: 22 January 1666 (aged 74); Muthamman Burj, Red Fort, Agra, Agra Subah, Mughal Empire
- Burial: 1 February 1666; Taj Mahal, Agra, Uttar Pradesh, India
- Spouses: Kandahari Begum (m. 1610); Mumtaz Mahal (m. 1612; died 1631); Izz-un-Nissa (m. 1617); Kunwari Leelavati Deiji; Fatehpuri Begum
- Issue more...: Parhez Banu Begum; Hur-ul-Nisa Begum; Jahanara Begum; Dara Shikoh; Shah Shuja; Roshanara Begum; Aurangzeb; Murad Bakhsh; Gauhar Ara Begum
Names
- Mirza Shahab-ud-Din Muhammad Khurram Shah Jahan
Regnal name
- Shah Jahan
Posthumous name
- Firduas Ashiyani (lit. 'One who nest in Paradise')
- House: Mughal
- Dynasty: Timurid
- Father: Jahangir
- Mother: Manavati Bai
- Religion: Sunni Islam (Hanafi)
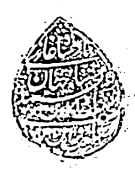
- Tughra

Shah Jahan I (Note: Persian pronunciation: [ʃɑːh d͡ʒa.ˈhɑːn]; lit. 'King of the World') (Shahab-ud-Din Muhammad Khurram; 5 January 1592 – 22 January 1666), also called Shah Jahan the Magnificent, was the fifth Mughal Emperor from 1628 until his deposition in 1658. His reign marked the zenith of Mughal architectural and cultural achievements.

The third son of Jahangir (r. 1605–1627), Shah Jahan participated in the military campaigns against the Sisodia Rajputs of Mewar and the rebel Lodi nobles of the Deccan. After Jahangir's death in October 1627, Shah Jahan defeated his youngest brother Shahryar Mirza and crowned himself emperor in the Agra Fort. In addition to Shahryar, Shah Jahan executed most of his rival claimants to the throne. He commissioned many monuments, including the Red Fort, Shah Jahan Mosque and the famous Taj Mahal, where his favorite consort Mumtaz Mahal is entombed. In foreign affairs, Shah Jahan presided over the aggressive campaigns against the Deccan sultanates, the conflicts with the Portuguese, and the wars with the Safavids. He also suppressed several local rebellions and dealt with the devastating Deccan famine of 1630–1632.

In September 1657, the ailing Shah Jahan appointed his eldest son Dara Shikoh as his successor. This led to the Mughal war of succession (1658–1659) between his three sons, with Aurangzeb (r. 1658–1707) emerging victorious and becoming the sixth emperor, and executing all of his surviving brothers, including the Crown Prince Dara Shikoh. After Shah Jahan recovered from his illness in July 1658, Aurangzeb had him imprisoned inside the Agra Fort from July 1658 until his death in January 1666. He was laid to rest next to his wife in the Taj Mahal. His reign is known for abandoning the liberal policies initiated by his grandfather Akbar. During Shah Jahan's time, Islamic revivalist movements like the Naqshbandi began to shape Mughal policies.

== Early life ==
=== Birth and background ===
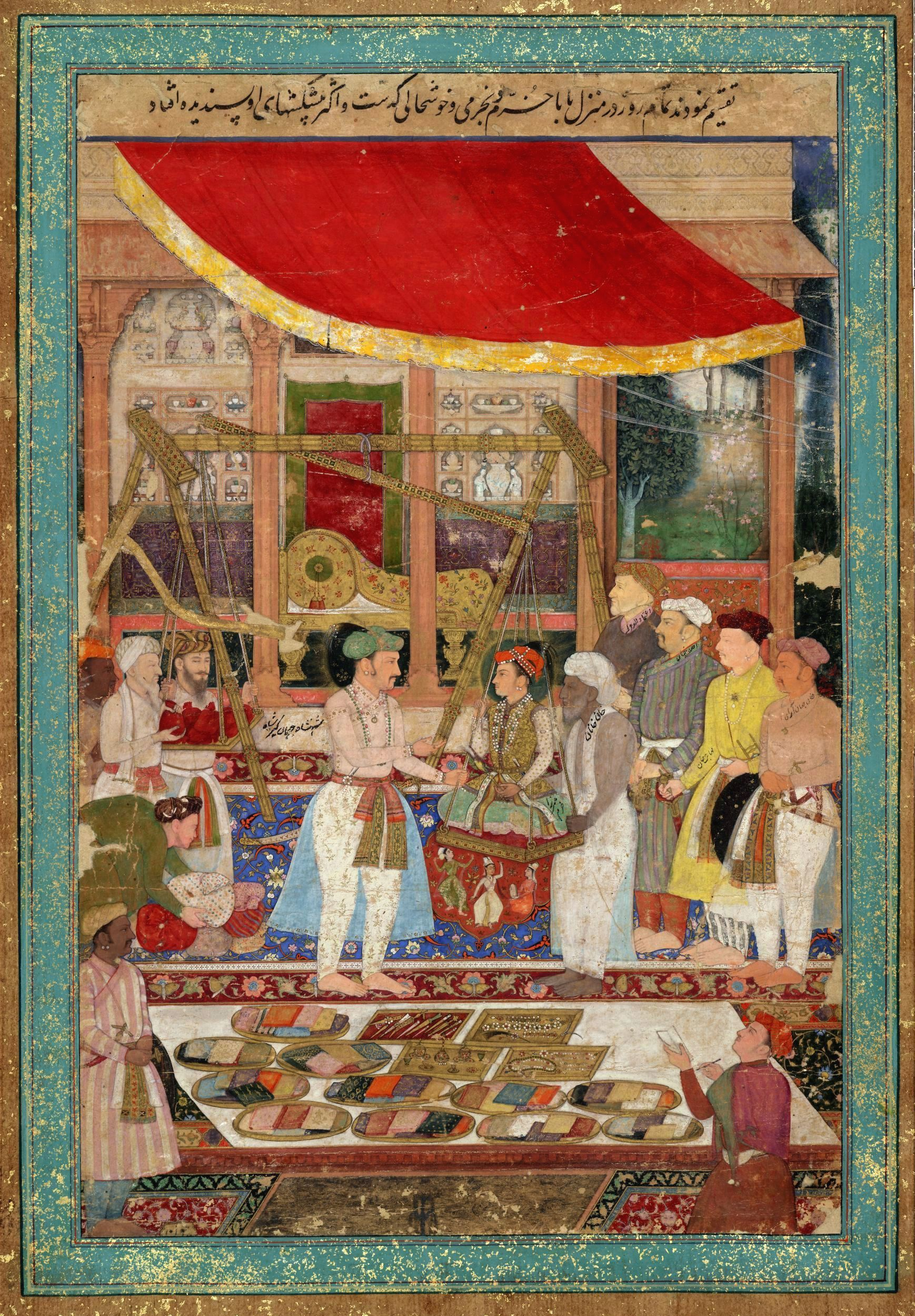
Jahangir weighing young Prince Khurram by Manohar Das c. 1610–1615

He was born on 5 January 1592 in Lahore, present-day Pakistan, as the ninth child and third son of Prince Salim (later known as 'Jahangir' upon his accession) and his chief consort, Jagat Gosain. The name Khurram (Persian: خرم, lit. 'joyous') was chosen for the young prince by his grandfather, Emperor Akbar, with whom the young prince shared a close relationship. Jahangir stated that Akbar was very fond of Khurram and had often told him, "There is no comparison between him and your other sons. I consider him my true son."

When Khurram was born, Akbar, considering him to be auspicious, insisted the prince be raised in his household rather than Salim's and was thus entrusted to the care of Ruqaiya Sultan Begum. Ruqaiya assumed the primary responsibility for raising Khurram and is noted to have raised Khurram affectionately. Jahangir noted in his memoirs that Ruqaiya had loved his son, Khurram, "a thousand times more than if he had been her own [son]."

However, after the death of his grandfather Akbar in 1605, he returned to the care of his mother, Jagat Gosain whom he cared for and loved immensely. Although separated from her at birth, he had become devoted to her and had her addressed as Hazrat in court chronicles. On the death of Jagat Gosain in Akbarabad on 8 April 1619, he is recorded to be inconsolable by Jahangir and mourned for 21 days. For these three weeks of the mourning period, he attended no public meetings and subsisted on simple vegetarian meals. His consort Mumtaz Mahal personally supervised the distribution of food to the poor during this period. She led the recitation of the Quran every morning, and gave her husband many lessons on the substance of life and death, and begged him not to grieve.

=== Education ===
As a child, Khurram received a broad education befitting his status as a Mughal prince, which included martial training and exposure to a wide variety of cultural arts, such as poetry and music, most of which were inculcated, according to court chroniclers, by Jahangir. According to his chronicler Qazvini, prince Khurram was only familiar with a few Turki words and showed little interest in the study of the language as a child. Khurram was attracted to Hindi literature since his childhood, and his Hindi letters were mentioned in his father's biography, Tuzk-e-Jahangiri. In 1605, as Akbar lay on his deathbed, young Khurram remained by his bedside and refused to move even after his mother tried to retrieve him. Given the politically uncertain times immediately preceding Akbar's death, Khurram was in a fair amount of physical danger from political opponents of his father. He was at last ordered to return to his quarters by the senior women of his grandfather's household, namely Salima Sultan Begum and his grandmother Mariam-uz-Zamani as Akbar's health deteriorated.

=== Khusrau rebellion ===
In 1605, his father succeeded to the throne, after crushing a rebellion by Prince Khusrau. Khurram left Ruqaiya's care and returned to his mother's care. As the third son, Khurram did not challenge the two major power blocs of the time, his father's and his half-brother's; thus, he enjoyed the benefits of imperial protection and luxury while being allowed to continue with his education and training. This relatively quiet and stable period of his life allowed Khurram to build his own support base in the Mughal court, which would be useful later on in his life.

Jahangir assigned Khurram to guard the palace and treasury while he went to pursue Khusrau. He was later ordered to bring Mariam-uz-Zamani, his grandmother and Jahangir's harem to him.

During Khusrau's second rebellion, Khurram's informants informed him that Fatehullah, Nuruddin and Muhammad Sharif gathered around 500 men at Khusrau's instigation and lay await for the Emperor. Khurram relayed this information to Jahangir who praised him.

Jahangir had Khurram weighed against gold, silver and other wealth at his mansion at Orta.

=== Nur Jahan ===
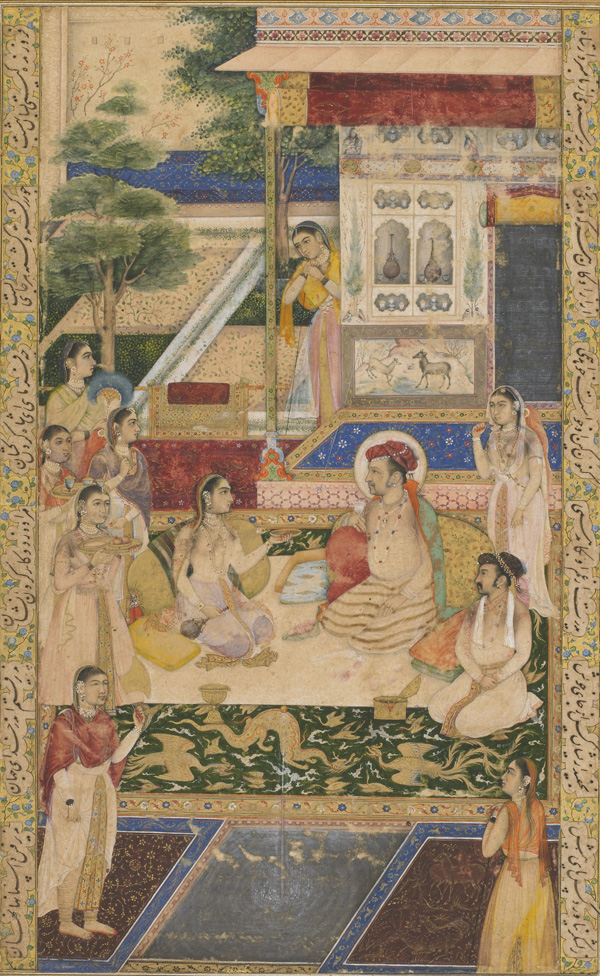
Jahangir and Nur Jahan with prince Khurram at Aram Bagh c. 1640–1650

Due to the long period of tensions between his father and his half-brother, Khusrau Mirza, Khurram began to drift closer to his father, and, over time, started to be considered the de facto heir-apparent by court chroniclers. This status was given official sanction when Jahangir granted the sarkar of Hissar-e-Feroza, which had traditionally been the fief of the heir-apparent, to Khurram in 1608. After her marriage to Jahangir in the year 1611, Nur Jahan gradually became an active participant in all decisions made by Jahangir and gained extreme powers in administration, so much so that it was obvious to everyone both inside and outside that most of his decisions were actually hers. Slowly, while Jahangir became more indulgent in wine and opium, she was considered to be the actual power behind the throne. Her near and dear relatives acquired important positions in the Mughal court, termed the Nur Jahan junta by historians. Khurram was in constant conflict with his stepmother, Nur Jahan who favoured her son-in-law Shahryar Mirza for the succession to the Mughal throne over him. In the last years of Jahangir's life, Nur Jahan was in full power, and the emperor had left all the burden of governance on her. She tried to weaken Khurram's position in the Mughal court by sending him on campaigns far in Deccan, while ensuring several favours were being bestowed on her son-in-law. Khurram, after sensing the danger posed to his status as heir-apparent, rebelled against his father in 1622 but did not succeed and eventually lost the favour of his father. Several years before Jahangir's death in 1627, coins began to be struck containing Nur Jahan's name along with Jahangir's name; In fact, there were two prerogatives of sovereignty for the legitimacy of a Muslim monarchy (reading the Khutbah and the other being the right to mint coins). After the death of Jahangir in 1627, a struggle developed between Khurram and his half-brother, Shahryar Mirza, for the succession to the Mughal throne. Khurram won the battle of succession and became the fifth Mughal Emperor. Nur Jahan was subsequently deprived of her imperial stature, authority, privileges, honors and economic grants and was put under house arrest on the orders of Khurram and led a quiet and comfortable life till her death.

== Ancestry ==
Shah Jahan's Ancestors

Babur	Maham Begum	Prithviraj Singh I	Apurva Devi
Humayun	Hamida Banu Begum	Raja Bharmal	Rani Champavati Solanki
Akbar	Mariam-uz-Zamani	Udai Singh of Marwar	Manrang Devi
Jahangir	Jagat Gosain
Shah Jahan

Ancestors of Shah Jahan

8. Humayun
4. Akbar I
9. Hamida Banu Begum
2. Jahangir
10. Bharmal
5. Mariam-uz-Zamani
11. Champavati Solanki
1. Shah Jahan I
12. Maldeo Rathore
6. Udai Singh I
13. Swarup Devi
3. Jagat Gosain
14. Askaran
7. Rajavat Kachawahi Manrang Devi

== Marriages ==
In 1607, Khurram became engaged to Arjumand Banu Begum (1593–1631), who is also known as Mumtaz Mahal (Persian lit. ' The Exalted One of the Palace'). They were about 14 and 15 when they were engaged, and five years later, they married. The young girl belonged to an illustrious Persian noble family that included Abu'l-Hasan Asaf Khan, who had been serving Mughal emperors since the reign of Akbar. The family's patriarch was Mirza Ghiyas Beg, who was also known by his title I'timād-ud-Daulah or "Pillar of the State". He had been Jahangir's finance minister, and his son, Asaf Khan – Arjumand Banu's father – played an important role in the Mughal court, eventually serving as Chief Minister. Her aunt Mehr-un-Nissa later became the Empress Nur Jahan, chief consort of Emperor Jahangir.

The prince would have to wait five years before he was married in 1612 (1021 AH), on a date selected by the court astrologers as most conducive to ensuring a happy marriage. This was an unusually long engagement for the time. However, Shah Jahan first married a Persian princess (name not known) entitled Kandahari Begum, the daughter of a great-grandson of the great Shah Ismail I of Persia, with whom he had a daughter, his first child.

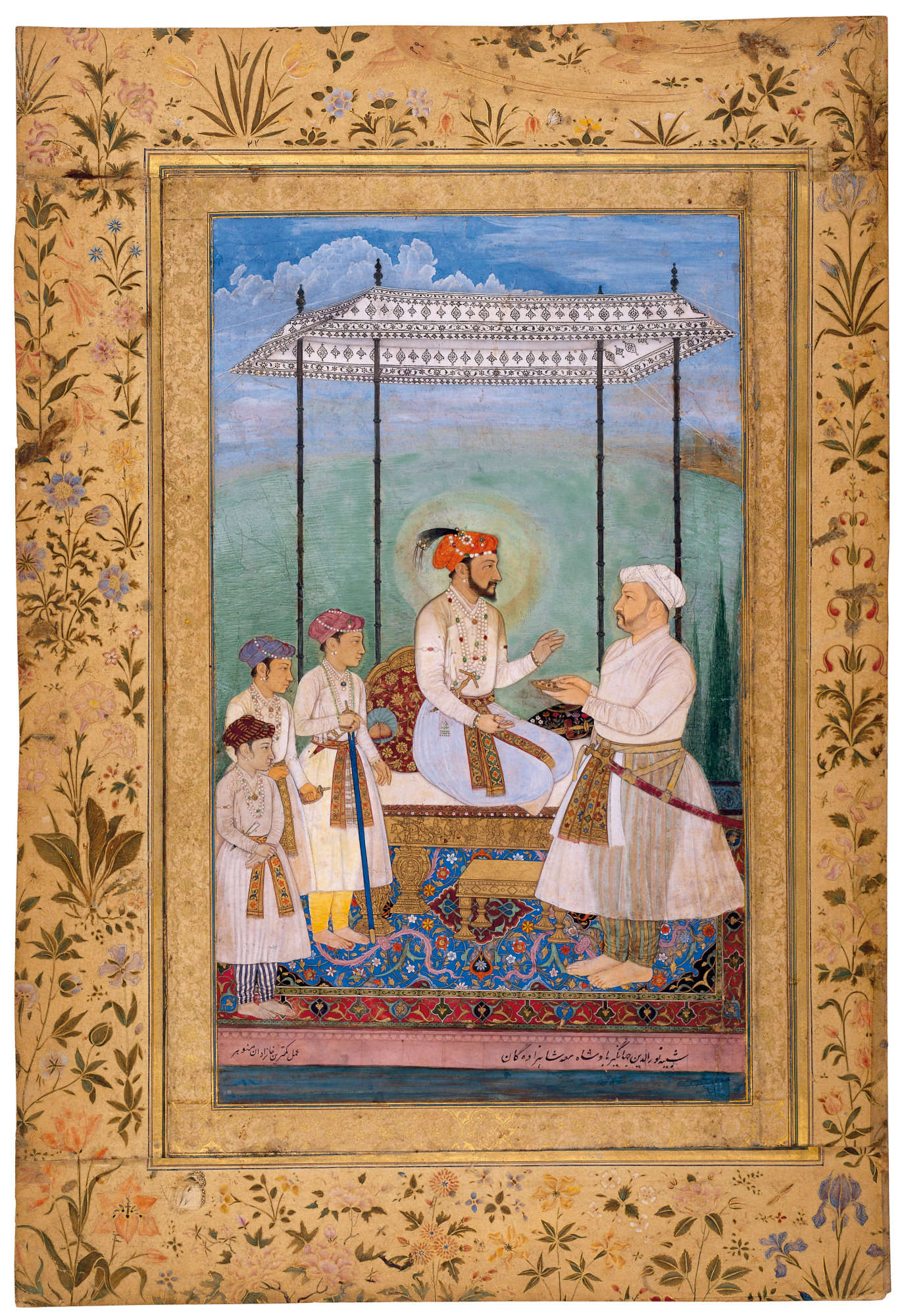
Shah Jahan, accompanied by his three sons: Dara Shikoh, Shah Shuja and Aurangzeb, and their maternal grandfather, Asaf Khan IV

In 1612, aged 20, Khurram married Mumtaz Mahal, on a date chosen by court astrologers. The marriage was a happy one, and Khurram remained devoted to her. They had fourteen children, out of whom seven survived into adulthood.

Though there was genuine love between the two, Arjumand Banu Begum was a politically astute woman and served as a crucial advisor and confidante to her husband. Later on, as empress, Mumtaz Mahal wielded immense power, such as being consulted by her husband in state matters, attending the council (shura or diwan), and being responsible for the imperial seal, which allowed her to review official documents in their final draft. Shah Jahan also gave her the right to issue her own orders (hukums) and make appointments to him.

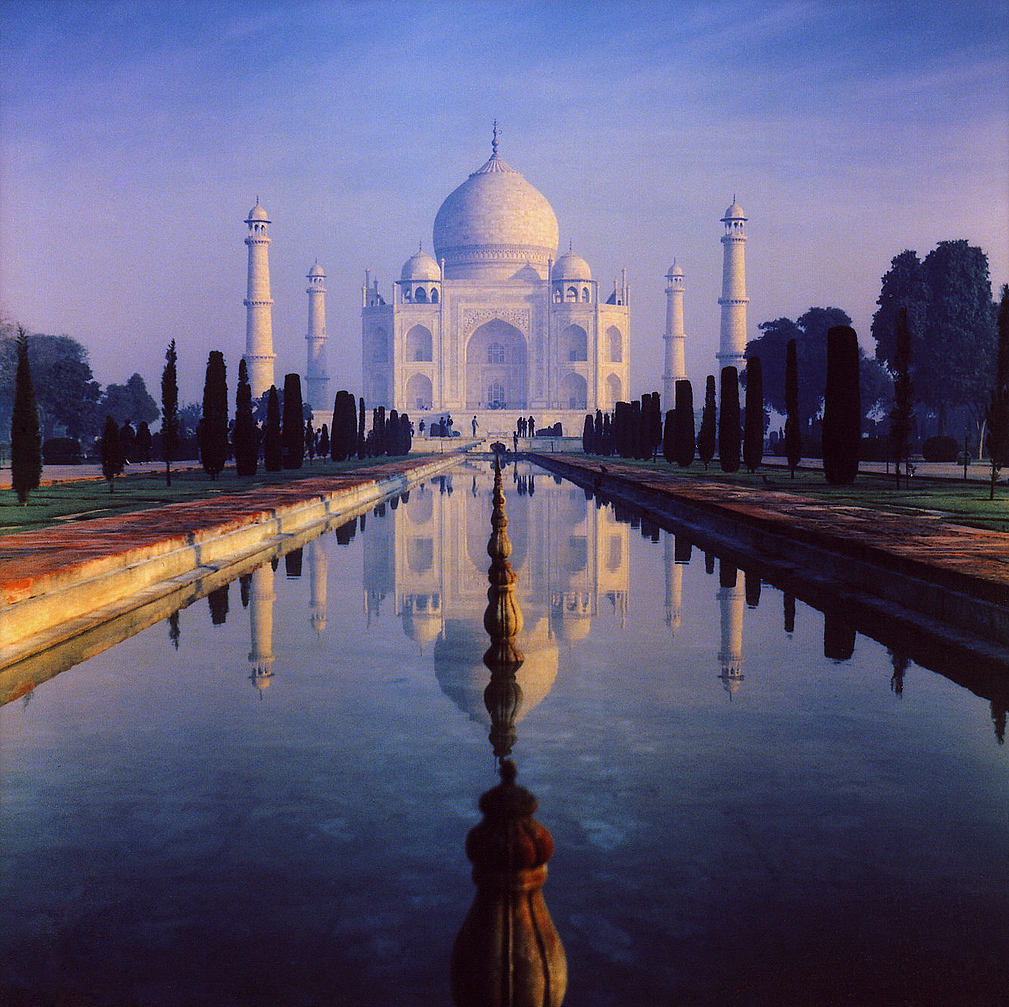
The Taj Mahal, the burial place of Shah Jahan and his wife Mumtaz Mahal

Mumtaz Mahal died at the young age of 38 (7 June 1631), upon giving birth to Princess Gauhar Ara Begum in the city of Burhanpur, Deccan, of a postpartum haemorrhage, which caused considerable blood-loss after painful labor of thirty hours. Contemporary historians note that Princess Jahanara, aged 17, was so distressed by her mother's pain that she started distributing gems to the poor, hoping for divine intervention, and Shah Jahan was noted as being "paralysed by grief" and weeping fits. Her body was temporarily buried in a walled pleasure garden known as Zainabad, originally constructed by Shah Jahan's uncle Prince Daniyal along the Tapti River. Her death had a profound impact on Shah Jahan's personality and inspired the construction of the marvelous Taj Mahal, where she was later reburied.

Khurram had taken other wives, among whom were Kandahari Begum (m. 28 October 1610) and another Persian princess, Izz un-Nisa Begum (m. 2 September 1617), the daughters of Prince Muzaffar Husain Mirza Safawi and Shahnawaz Khan, son of Abdul Rahim Khan-I-Khana, respectively. But according to court chroniclers, these marriages were more out of political consideration, and they enjoyed only the status of being royal wives.

Khurram is also recorded to have married Leelavati Deiji, daughter of Kunwar Shakti Singh, son of Mota Raja Udai Singh and half-brother of Raja Sur Singh of Marwar. The marriage took place at Jodhpur when Khurram was in rebellion against his father, emperor Jahangir.

=== Relation with Jahanara ===
After Shah Jahan fell ill in 1658, his daughter Jahanara Begum had a significant influence in the Mughal administration. As a result, several accusations of an incestual relationship between Shah Jahan and Jahanara were propagated. Such accusations have been dismissed by modern historians as gossip, as no witness of an incident has been mentioned.

Historian K. S. Lal also dismisses such claims as rumors propagated by courtiers and mullahs. He cites Aurangzeb's confining of Jahanara in the Agra Fort with the Royal prisoner and the talk of the low people magnifying a rumor.

Several contemporary travelers have mentioned such accessions. Francois Bernier, a French physician, mentions rumors of an incestuous relationship being propagated in the Mughal Court. However, Bernier did not mention witnessing such a relationship. Niccolao Manucci, a Venetian traveler, dismisses such accusations by Bernier as gossip and "The talk of the Low People".

== Early military campaigns ==
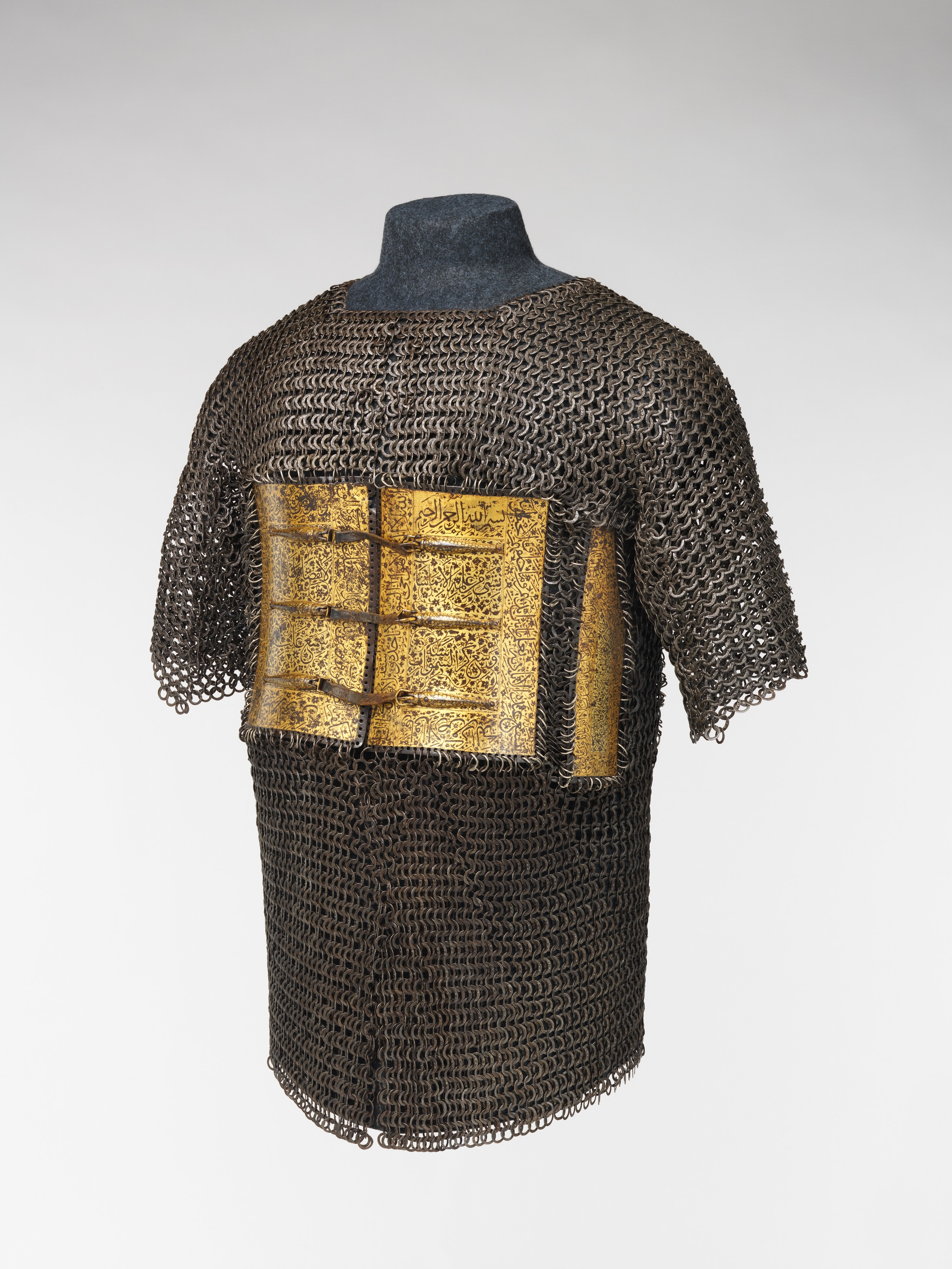
Shirt of the personal armour of Shah Jahan c. 1632–1633

Prince Khurram showed extraordinary military talent. The first occasion for Khurram to test his military prowess was during the Mughal campaign against the Rajput state of Mewar, which had been a hostile force to the Mughals since Akbar's reign.

After a year of a harsh war of attrition, Rana Amar Singh I surrendered conditionally to the Mughal forces and became a vassal state of the Mughal Empire as a result of Mughal expedition of Mewar. In 1615, Khurram presented Kunwar Karan Singh, Amar Singh's heir, to Jahangir. Khurram was sent to pay homage to his mother and stepmothers and was later awarded by Jahangir. The same year, his mansab was increased from 12000/6000 to 15000/7000, to equal that of his brother Parvez's and was further increased to 20000/10000 in 1616.

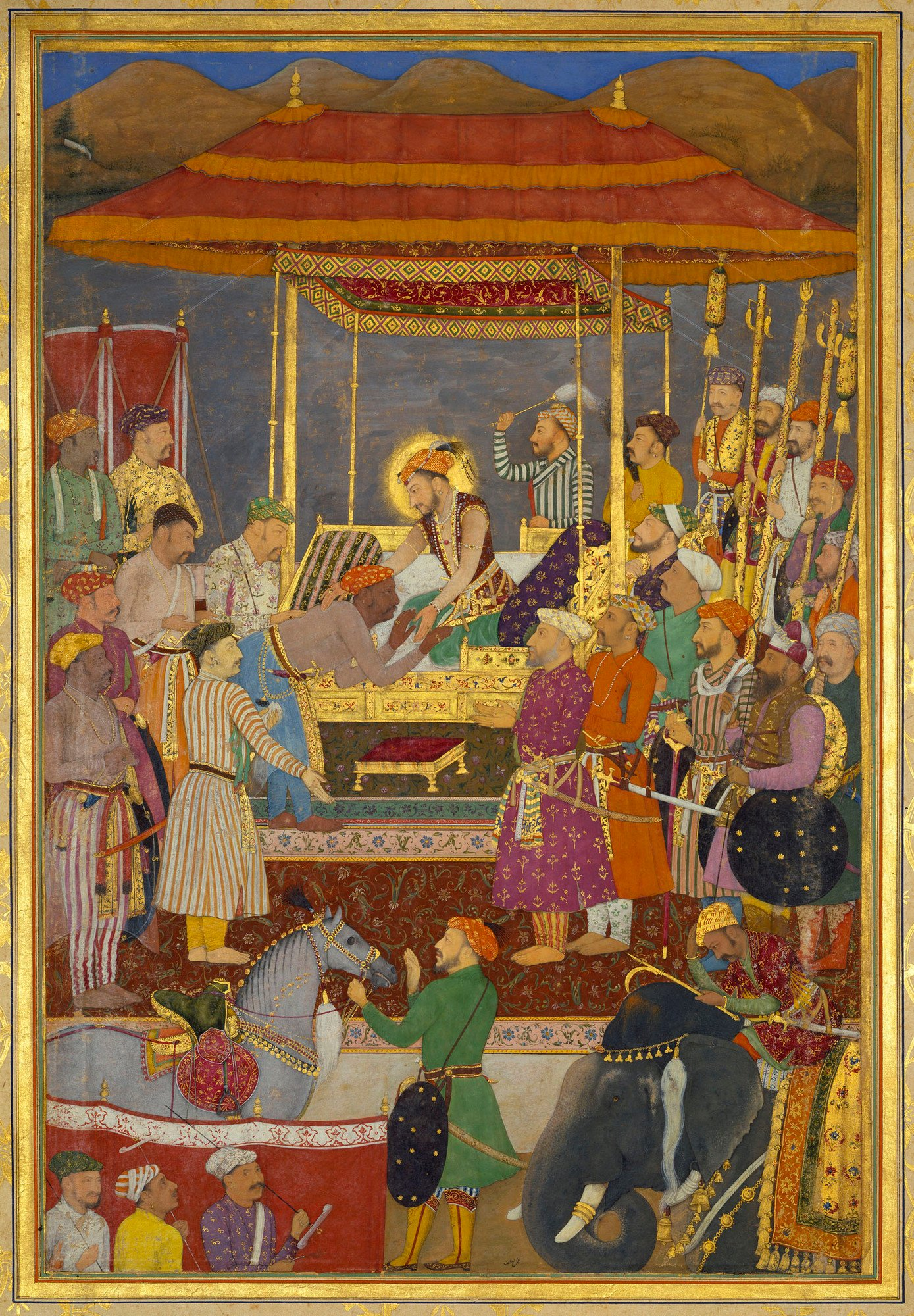
The ubmission of Rana Amar Singh of Mewar to Prince Khurram, Tuzk-e-Jahangiri

In 1616, on Khurram's departure to Deccan, Jahangir awarded him the title Shah Sultan Khurram.

In 1617, Khurram was directed to deal with the Lodis in the Deccan to secure the Empire's southern borders and to restore imperial control over the region. On his return in 1617, after successes in these campaigns, Khurram performed koronush before Jahangir, who called him to jharoka and rose from his seat to embrace him. Jahangir also granted him the title of Shah Jahan (Persian: "King of the World"), and raised his military rank to 30000/20000 and allowed him a special throne in his Durbar, an unprecedented honor for a prince. Edward S. Holden writes, "He was flattered by some, envied by others, loved by none."

In 1618, Shah Jahan was given the first copy of Tuzk-e-Jahangiri by his father, who considered him "the first of all my sons in everything."

== Rebel prince ==
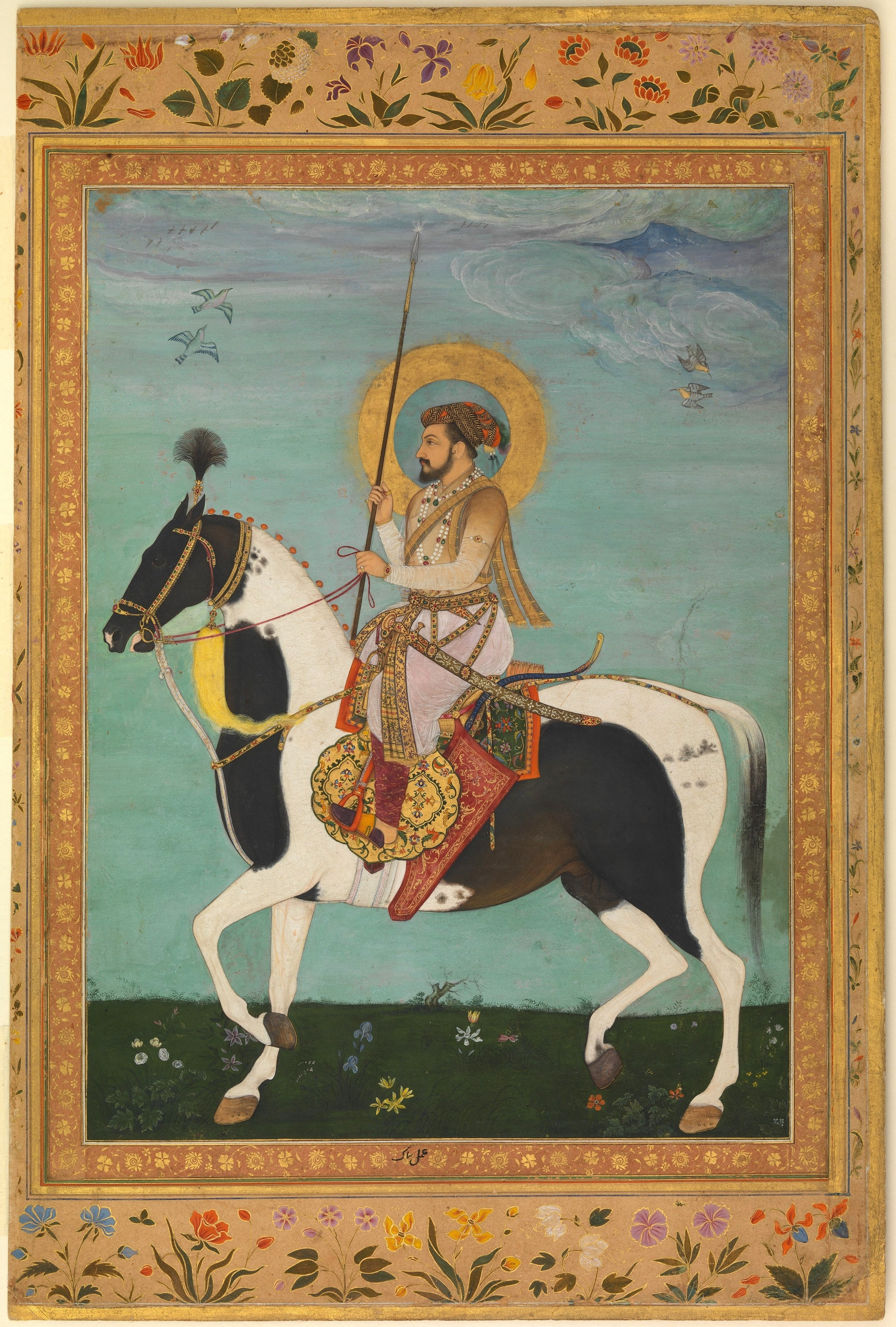
Shah Jahan on horseback during his youth

Inheritance in the Mughal Empire was not always determined through primogeniture, but also by princely sons competing to achieve military successes and consolidating their power at court. This often led to rebellions and wars of succession (takht ya takhta). As a result, a complex political climate surrounded the Mughal court in Shah Jahan's formative years. In 1611 his father married Nur Jahan, the widowed daughter of a Persian noble. She rapidly became an important member of Jahangir's court and, together with her brother Asaf Khan, wielded considerable influence. Arjumand was Asaf Khan's daughter, and her marriage to Khurram consolidated Nur Jahan and Asaf Khan's positions in court.

Court intrigues, however, including Nur Jahan's decision to have her daughter from her first marriage wed Prince Khurram's youngest brother Shahzada Shahryar, and her support for his claim to the throne led to much internal division. Prince Khurram resented the influence Nur Jahan held over his father and was angered at having to play second fiddle to her favourite Shahryar, his half-brother and her son-in-law. When the Persians besieged Kandahar, Nur Jahan was at the helm of the affairs. She ordered Prince Khurram to march to Kandahar, but he refused. As a result of Prince Khurram's refusal to obey Nur Jahan's orders, Kandahar was lost to the Persians after a forty-five-day siege. Prince Khurram feared that in his absence, Nur Jahan would attempt to poison his father against him and convince Jahangir to name Shahryar the heir in his place. This fear brought Prince Khurram to rebel against his father rather than fight against the Persians.

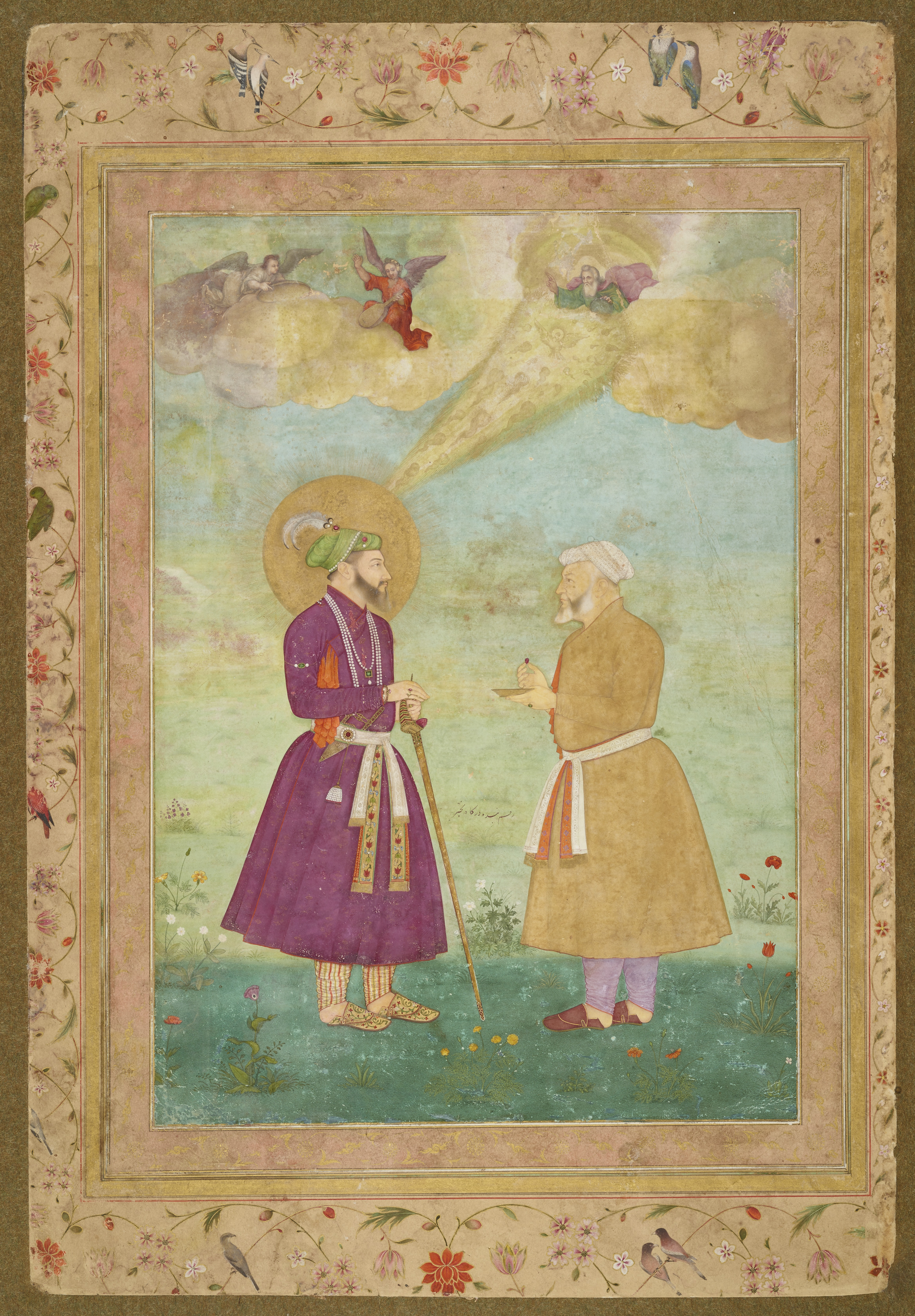
Shah Jahan with Asaf Khan from the Late Shah Jahan Album, c. 1640, by Bichitr, Arthur M. Sackler Collection, National Museum of Asian Art.

In 1622, Prince Khurram raised an army and marched against his father. He was defeated at Bilochpur in March 1623. Later he took refuge in Udaipur Mewar with Maharana Karan Singh II. He was first lodged in Delwada Ki Haveli and subsequently shifted to Jagmandir Palace on his request. Prince Khurram exchanged his turban with the Maharana and that turban is still preserved in Pratap Museum, Udaipur (R V Somani 1976). It is believed that the mosaic work of Jagmandir inspired him to use mosaic work in the Taj Mahal of Agra. In November 1623, he found safe asylum in Bengal Subah after he was driven from Agra and the Deccan. He advanced through Midnapur and Burdwan. At Akbarnagar, he defeated and killed the then Subahdar of Bengal, Ibrahim Khan Fath-i-Jang, on 20 April 1624. He entered Dhaka and "all the elephants, horses, and 4,000,000 rupees in specie belonging to the Government were delivered to him". After a short stay he then moved to Patna. His rebellion did not succeed in the end, as his attempt was foiled by Jahangir 's trusted general, Mahabat Khan. He was forced to submit unconditionally after he was defeated near Allahabad. Although the prince was forgiven for his errors in 1626, tensions between Nur Jahan and her stepson continued to grow beneath the surface.

Upon the death of Jahangir in 1627, the wazir Asaf Khan, who had long been a quiet partisan of Prince Khurram, acted with unexpected forcefulness and determination to forestall his sister's plans to place Prince Shahryar on the throne. He put Nur Jahan in close confinement. He obtained control of Prince Khurram's three sons, who were under her charge. Asaf Khan also managed palace intrigues to ensure Prince Khurram's succession to the throne. Prince Khurram succeeded to the Mughal throne as Abu ud-Muzaffar Shihab ud-Din Mohammad Sahib ud-Quiran ud-Thani Shah Jahan Padshah Ghazi (Urdu: شهاب الدین محمد خرم), or Shah Jahan.

His regnal name is divided into various parts. Shihab ud-Din, meaning "Star of the Faith", Sahib al-Quiran ud-Thani, meaning "Second Lord of the Happy Conjunction of Jupiter and Venus". Shah Jahan, meaning "King of the World", alluding to his pride in his Timurid roots and his ambitions. More epithets showed his secular and religious duties. He was also titled Hazrat Shahenshah ("His Imperial Majesty"), Hazrat-i-Khilafat-Panahi ("His Majesty the Refuge of the Caliphate"), Hazrat Zill-i-Ilahi ("His Majesty the Shadow of God").

His first act as ruler was to execute his chief rivals and imprison his stepmother, Nur Jahan. Upon Shah Jahan's orders, several executions took place on 23 January 1628. Those put to death included his brother Shahryar; his nephews Dawar Bakhsh and Garshasp, sons of Shah Jahan's previously executed brother Prince Khusrau; and his cousins Tahmuras and Hoshang, sons of the late Prince Daniyal Mirza. This allowed Shah Jahan to rule his empire without contention.

== Reign ==
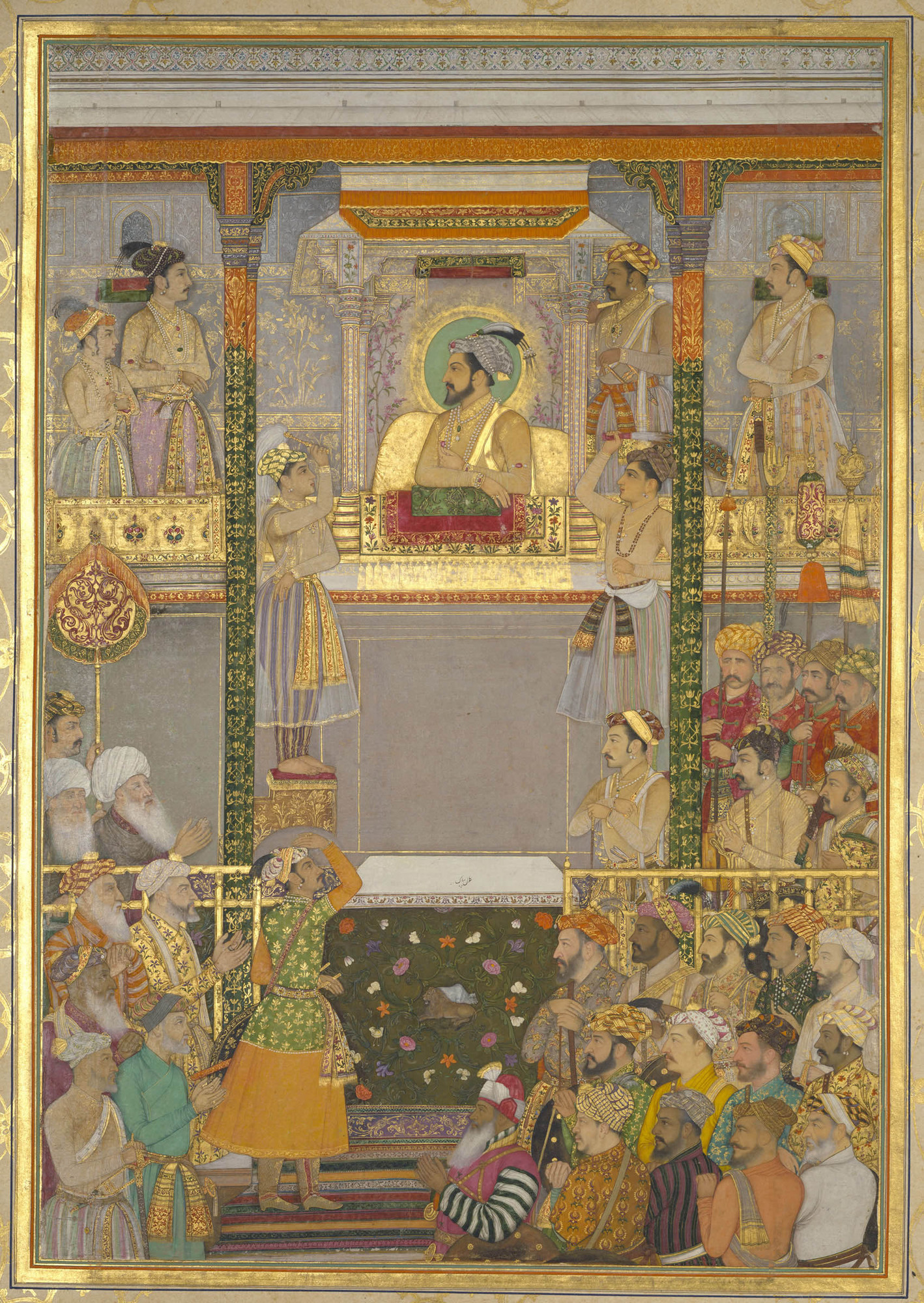
Shah Jahan at his Durbar, from the Windsor Padshahnama, c. 1657

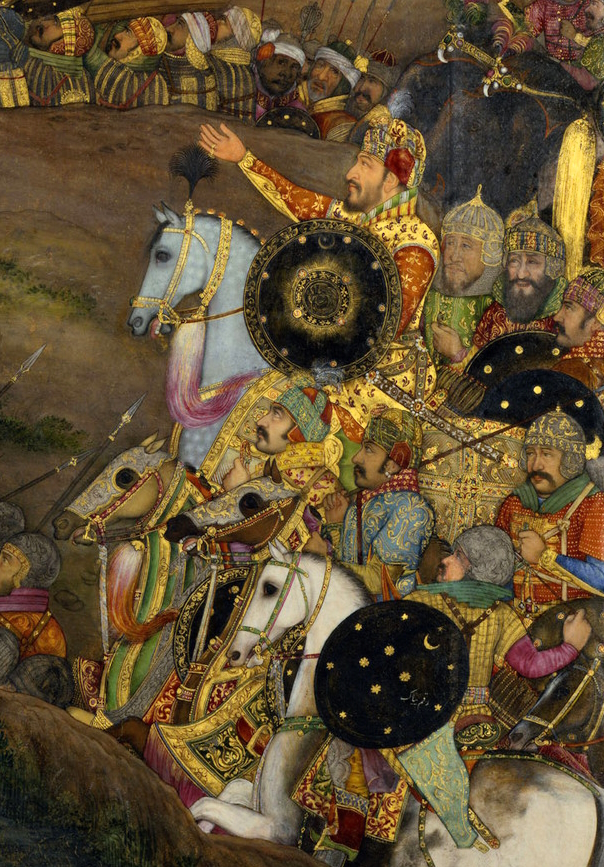
Khwaja Sabir "Nasiri Khan" directing the Mughal Siege of Kandhar Fort (Deccan), May 1631. Padshahnama, c.1635-50

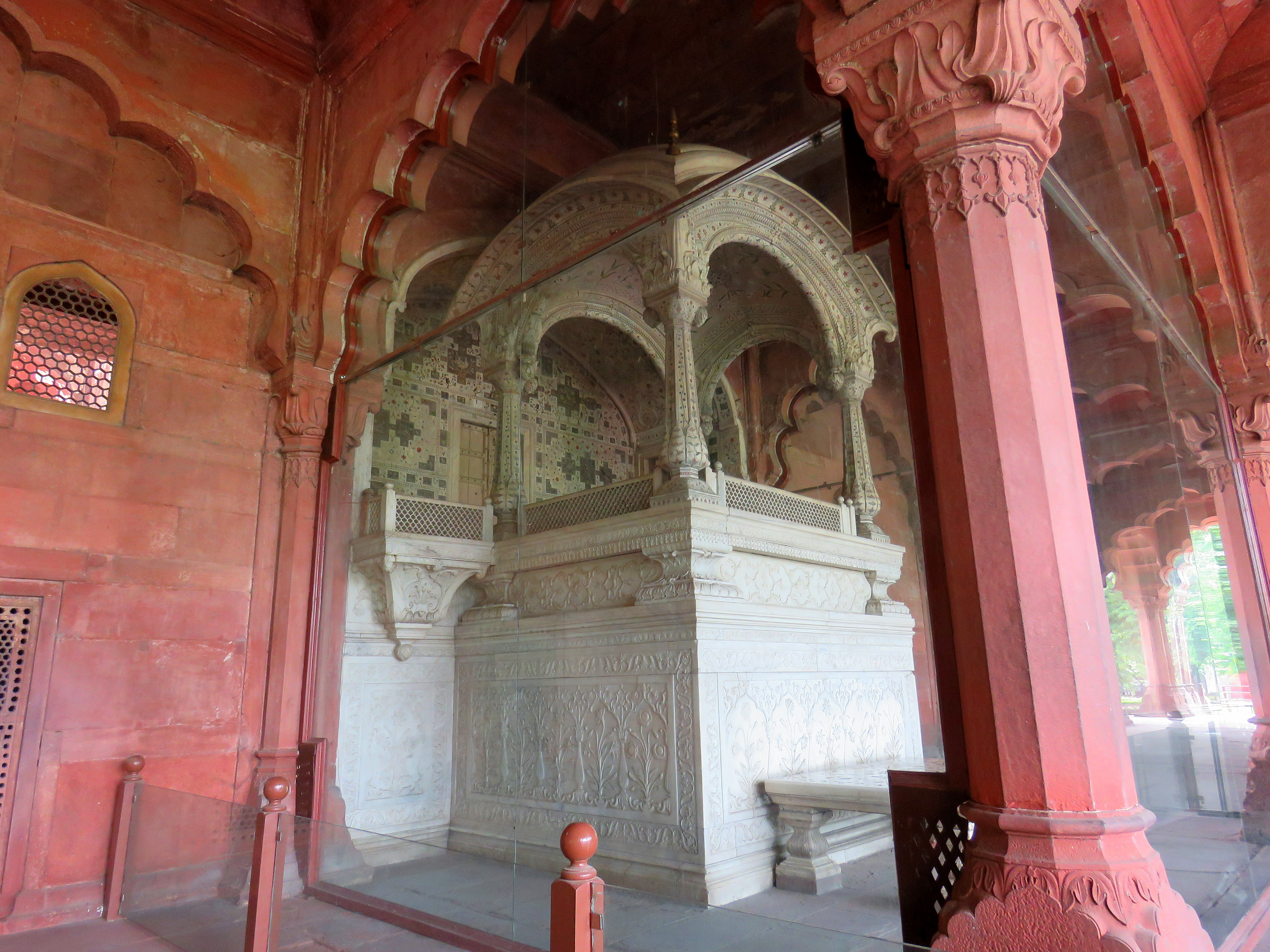
Throne of Mughal Emperor Shah Jahan of India, Red Fort, Delhi

Evidence from the reign of Shah Jahan states that in 1648 the army consisted of 911,400 infantry, musketeers, and artillery men, and 185,000 Sowars commanded by princes and nobles.

His cultural and political initial steps have been described as a type of the Timurid Renaissance, in which he built historical and political bonds with his Timurid heritage, mainly via his numerous unsuccessful military campaigns on his ancestral region of Balkh. In various forms, Shah Jahan appropriated his Timurid background and grafted it onto his imperial legacy.

During his reign, the Marwari horse was introduced, becoming Shah Jahan's favorite, and various Mughal cannons were mass-produced in the Jaigarh Fort. Under his rule, the empire became a huge military machine, and the nobles and their contingents multiplied almost fourfold, as did the demands for more revenue from their citizens. But due to his measures in the financial and commercial fields, it was a period of general stability – the administration was centralized and court affairs systematized.

The Mughal Empire continued to expand moderately during his reign, as his sons commanded large armies on different fronts. India at the time was a rich center of the arts, crafts and architecture, and some of the best of the architects, artisans, craftsmen, painters and writers of the world resided in Shah Jahan's empire. According to economist Angus Maddison, Mughal-era India's share of global gross domestic product (GDP) grew from 22.7% in 1600 to 24.4% in 1700, surpassing China to become the world's largest. E. Dewick and Murray Titus, quoting Badshahnama, write that 76 temples in Benares were demolished on Shah Jahan's orders.

=== Famine of 1630 ===
A famine broke out in 1630–1632 in Deccan, Gujarat and Khandesh as a result of three main crop failures. Two million people died of starvation; grocers sold dogs' flesh and mixed powdered bones with flour. It is reported that parents ate their own children. Some villages were completely destroyed, their streets filled with human corpses. In response to the devastation, Shah Jahan set up langar (free kitchens) for the victims of the famine.

=== Successful military campaigns against Deccan sultanates ===
In 1632, Shah Jahan captured the fortress at Daulatabad, Maharashtra and imprisoned Husein Shah of the Nizam Shahi Kingdom of Ahmednagar. Golconda submitted in 1635 and then Bijapur in 1636. Shah Jahan appointed Aurangzeb as Viceroy of the Deccan, consisting of Khandesh, Berar, Telangana, and Daulatabad. During his viceroyalty, Aurangzeb conquered Baglana where he defeated Baharji, the Raja. The small Maratha kingdom of Baglana straddled the main route from Surat and the western ports to Burhanpur in the Deccan, and had been subservient to one Muslim ruler or another for centuries. In 1637, however, Shah Jahan decided on complete annexation. Baharji, who had commanded the Baglana forces, died soon after the conquest. His son converted to Islam and received the title of Daulatmand Khan.

Aurangzeb then defeated Golconda in 1656, and then Bijapur in 1657.

=== Relations with the Safavid dynasty ===
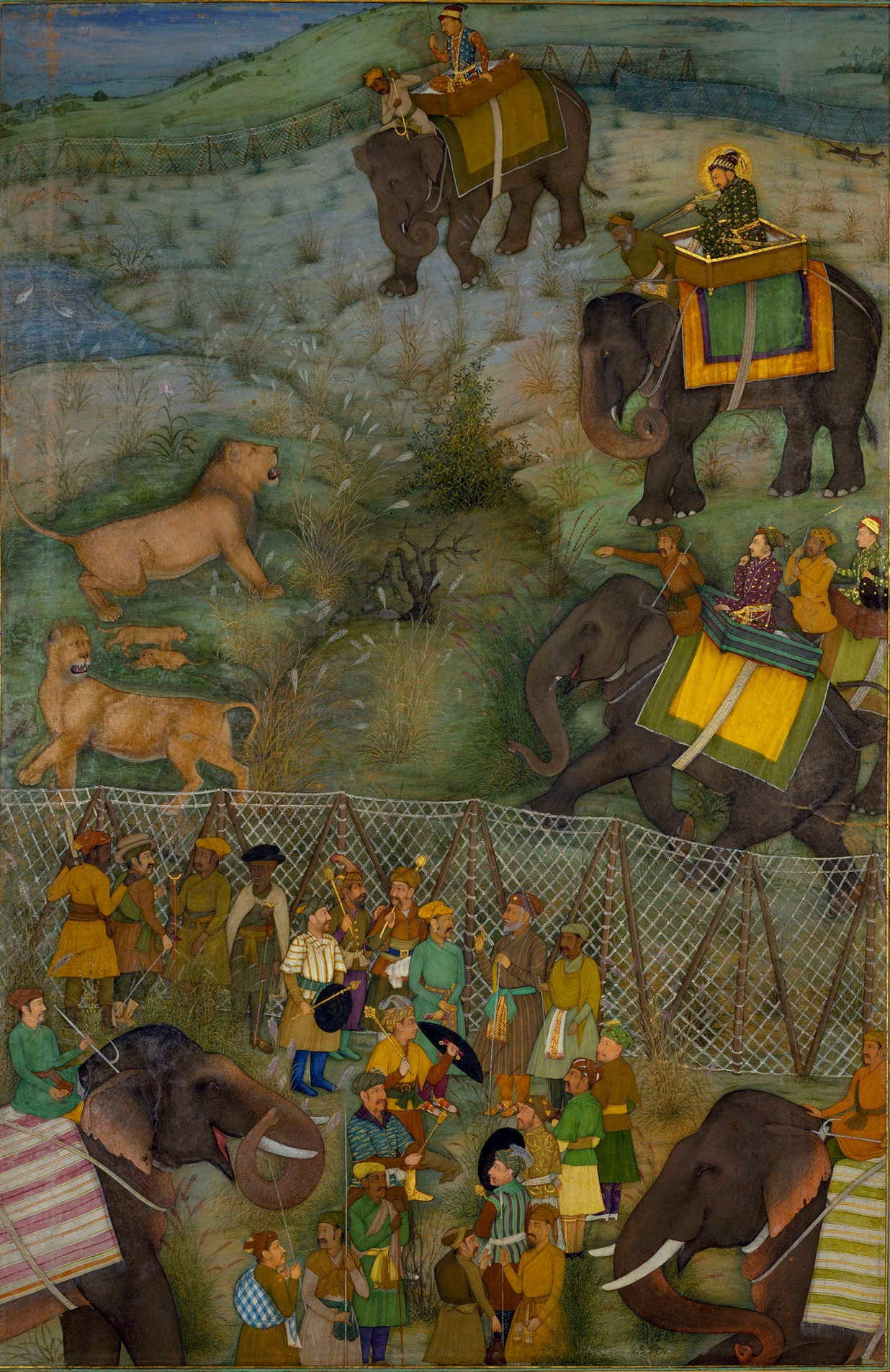
Painting of Shah Jahan hunting Asiatic lions at Burhanpur, present-day Madhya Pradesh, from 1630

Shah Jahan and his sons obtained the Fall of Kandahar (1638) and succeeded in the Siege of Bost (1638) from the Safavids, prompting the retaliation of the Persians led by their ruler Abbas II of Persia, who recaptured it in 1649. The Mughal armies were unable to recapture it despite repeated sieges during the Mughal–Safavid War. Shah Jahan also expanded the Mughal Empire to the west beyond the Khyber Pass to Ghazna and Kandahar.

=== Military campaign in Central Asia ===
Shah Jahan launched an invasion of Central Asia from 1646 to 1647 against the Khanate of Bukhara. With a total army of 75,000, Shah Jahan and his sons Aurangzeb and Murad Bakhsh temporarily occupied the territories of Balkh and Badakhshan. However, they retreated from the fruitless lands, and Balkh and Badakhshan returned to Bukharan control.

Britannica notes that Mughal forces occupied Badakhshān and Balkh in 1646, but Balkh was relinquished in 1647.

=== Relations with the Ottoman Empire ===
Shah Jahan sent an embassy to the Ottoman court in 1637. Led by Mir Zarif, it reached Sultan Murad IV the following year, while he was encamped in Baghdad. Zarif presented him with fine gifts and a letter that encouraged an alliance against Safavid Persia. The Sultan sent a return embassy led by Arsalan Agha. Shah Jahan received the ambassador in June 1640.

While he was encamped in Baghdad, Murad IV is known to have met ambassadors of the Mughal Emperor Shah Jahan, Mir Zarif and Mir Baraka, who presented 1000 pieces of finely embroidered cloth and even armor. Murad IV gave them the finest weapons, saddles and Kaftans and ordered his forces to accompany the Mughals to the port of Basra, where they set sail to Thatta and finally Surat. They exchanged lavish presents, but Shah Jahan was displeased with Sultan Murad's return letter, the tone of which he found discourteous. Sultan Murad's successor, Sultan Ibrahim, sent Shah Jahan another letter encouraging him to wage war against the Persians, but there is no record of a reply.

=== War with Portuguese ===
Shah Jahan gave orders in 1631 to Qasim Khan, the Mughal viceroy of Bengal, to drive out the Portuguese from their trading post at Port Hooghly. The post was heavily armed with cannons, battleships, fortified walls, and other instruments of war. The Portuguese were accused of trafficking by high Mughal officials, and due to commercial competition, the Mughal-controlled port of Saptagram began to slump. Shah Jahan was particularly outraged by the activities of Jesuits in that region, notably when they were accused of abducting peasants. On 25 September 1632, the Mughal Army raised imperial banners and gained control over the Bandel region, and the garrison was punished. On 23 December 1635, Shah Jahan issued a farman ordering the Agra Church to be demolished. The Church was occupied by the Portuguese Jesuits. However, the Emperor allowed the Jesuits to conduct their religious ceremonies in privacy. He also banned the Jesuits from preaching their religion and making converts from both Hindus and Muslims. Though in the decree, he also granted 777 bighas of rent-free land to the Augustinian Fathers and the Christian community in Bandel, currently in West Bengal, shaping its Portuguese heritage for times to come.

=== Religious policy ===
In 1632, Shah Jahan ordered the demolition of Hindu temples that was started by his predecessor Jahangir but remained unfinished. The Badshah-nama reports that 76 temples in Banaras were subsequently destroyed. Historian Richard Eaton describes the episode as one of the documented instances of temple desecration during the Mughal period.

== Revolts against Shah Jahan ==
The Kolis of Gujarat rebelled against the rule of Shah Jahan. In 1622, Shah Jahan sent Raja Vikramjit, the Governor of Gujarat, to subdue the Kolis of Ahmedabad. Between 1632 and 1635, four viceroys were appointed in an effort to manage the Koli's activities. The Kolis of Kankrej in North Gujarat committed excesses, and the Jam of Nawanagar refused to pay tribute to Shah Jahan. Soon, Ázam Khán was appointed in an effort to subdue the Kolis and bring order to the province. Ázam Khán marched against Koli rebels. When Ázam Khán reached Sidhpur, the local merchants complained bitterly of the outrages of one Kánji, a Chunvalia Koli, who had been especially daring in plundering merchandise and committing highway robberies. Ázam Khán, anxious to start with a show of vigour before proceeding to Áhmedábád, marched against Kánji, who fled to the village of Bhádar near Kheralu, sixty miles north-east of Áhmedábád. Ázam Khán pursued him so hotly that Kánji surrendered, handed over his plunder, and guaranteed that he would not only cease to commit robberies but also pay an annual tribute of Rupees 10,000. Ázam Khán then built two fortified posts in the Koli's territory, naming one Ázamábád after himself, and the other Khalílábád after his son. Additionally, he forced the surrender of the Jam of Nawanagar. The next viceroy, Ísa Tarkhán, carried out financial reforms. In 1644, the Mughal prince Aurangzeb was appointed as the viceroy, who then proceeded to become engaged in religious disputes, such as the destruction of a Jain temple in Ahmedabad. Due to these disputes, he was replaced by Shaista Khan who failed to subdue Kolis. Subsequently, prince Murad Bakhsh was appointed as the viceroy in 1654. He restored order and defeated the Koli rebels.

== Illness and death ==
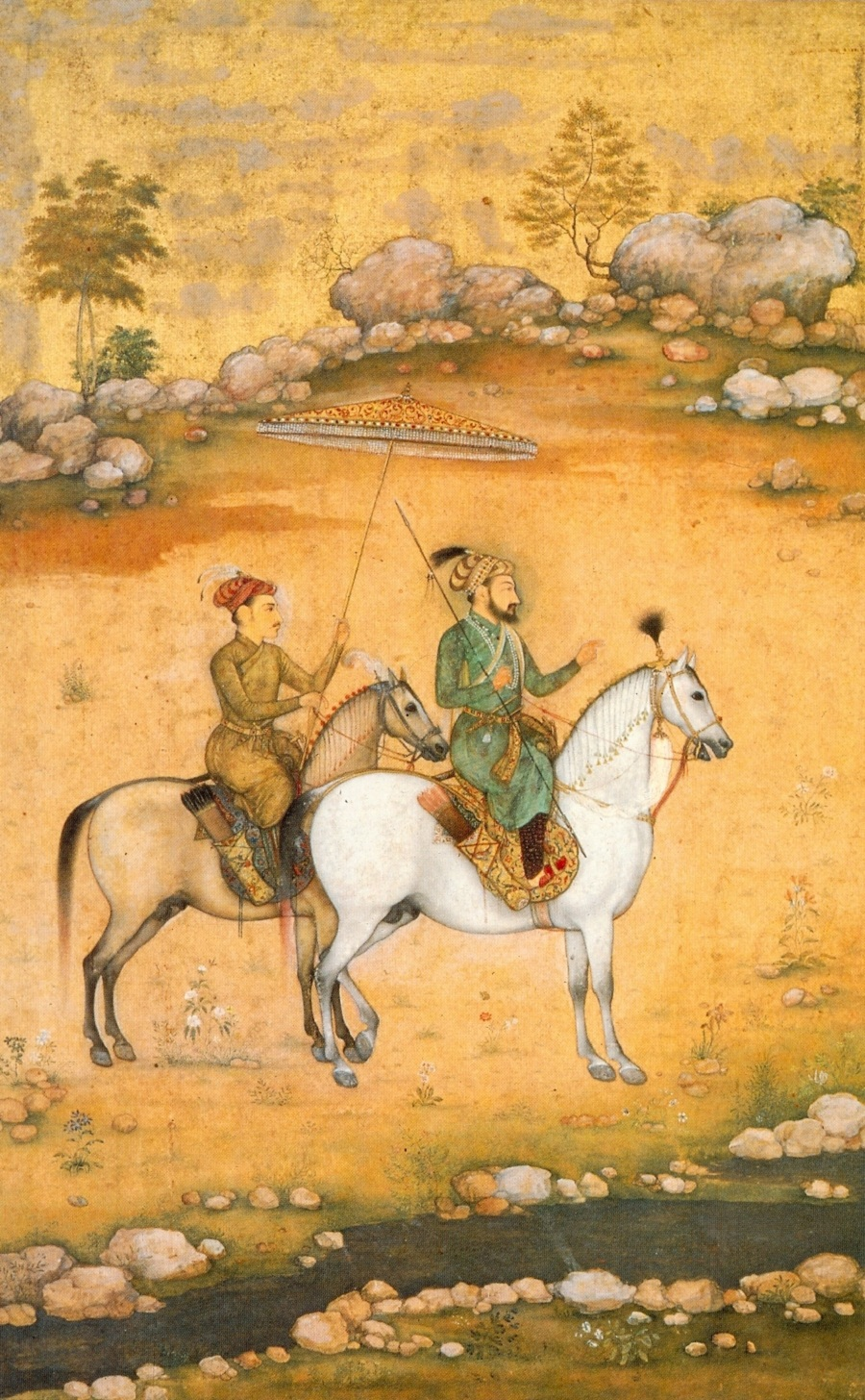
Shah Jahan and his eldest son, Dara Shikoh

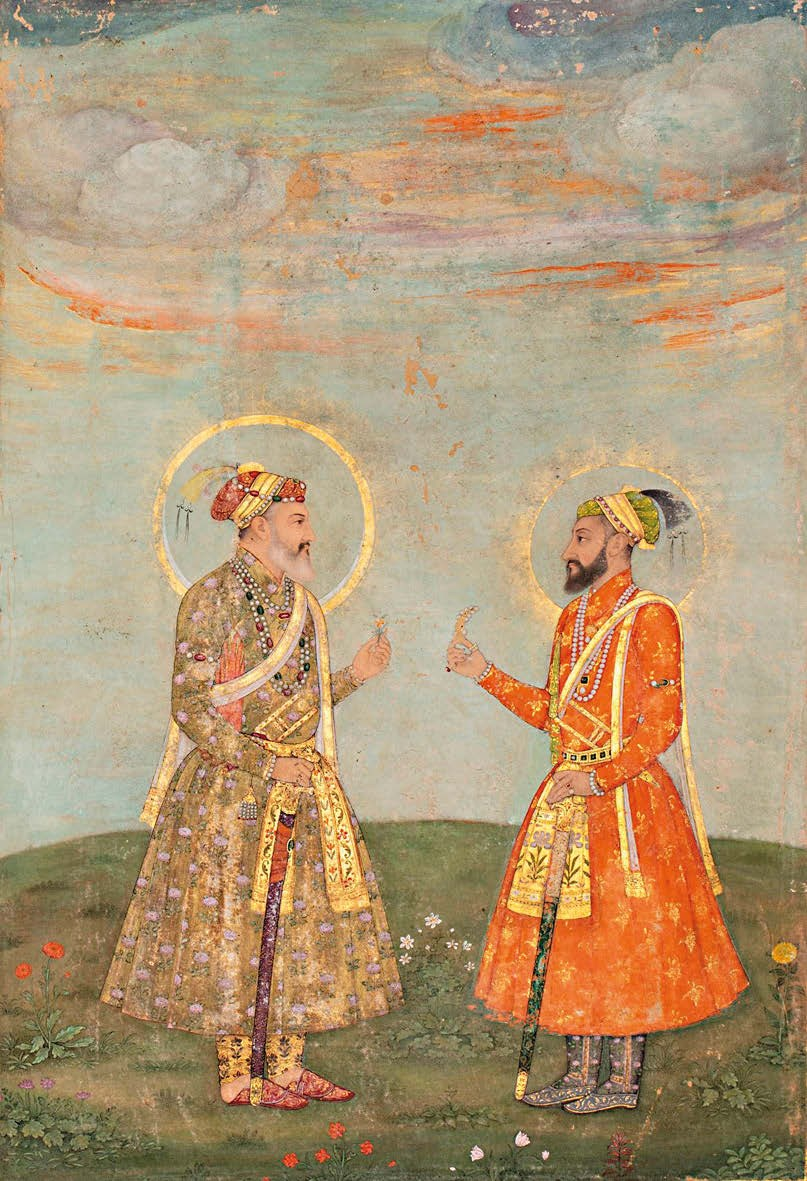
Portrait of Shah Jahan with his son Aurangzeb c. 1659

When Shah Jahan became ill in 1658, Dara Shikoh (Mumtaz Mahal's eldest son) assumed the role of regent in his father's stead, which swiftly incurred the animosity of his brothers. Upon learning of his assumption of the regency, his younger brothers, Shuja, Viceroy of Bengal, and Murad Baksh, Viceroy of Gujarat, declared their independence and marched upon Agra in order to claim their riches. Aurangzeb, the third son, gathered a well-trained army and became its chief commander. He faced Dara's army near Agra and defeated him during the Battle of Samugarh. Although Shah Jahan fully recovered from his illness, Aurangzeb declared him incompetent to rule and put him under house arrest in Agra Fort.

Jahanara Begum Sahib, Mumtaz Mahal's eldest surviving daughter, voluntarily shared his 8-year confinement and nursed him in his dotage. In January 1666, Shah Jahan fell ill. Confined to bed, he became progressively weaker until, on 22 January, he commended the ladies of the imperial court, particularly his consort of later years Akbarabadi Mahal, to the care of Jahanara. After reciting the Kal'ma (Laa ilaaha ill allah) and verses from the Quran, Shah Jahan died, aged 74.

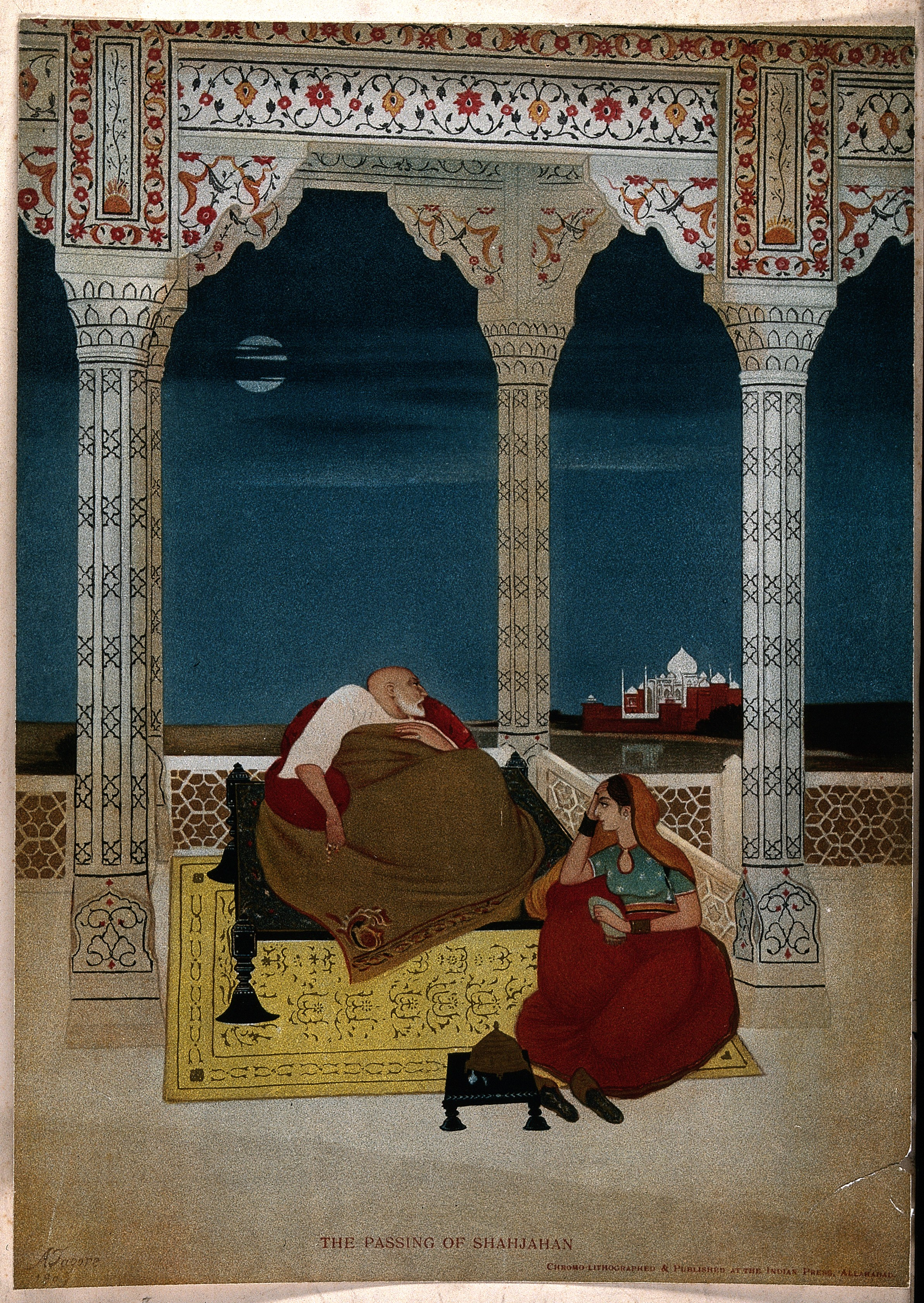
The Passing of Shah Jahan, 1902 by Abanindranath Tagore

Shah Jahan's chaplain Sayyid Muhammad Qanauji and Kazi Qurban of Agra came to the fort, moved his body to a nearby hall, washed it, enshrouded it, and put it in a coffin of sandalwood.

Princess Jahanara had planned a state funeral, which was to include a procession with Shah Jahan's body carried by eminent nobles followed by the notable citizens of Agra and officials scattering coins for the poor and needy. Aurangzeb refused to accommodate such ostentation. The body was taken to the Taj Mahal and was interred there next to the body of his beloved wife, Mumtaz Mahal.

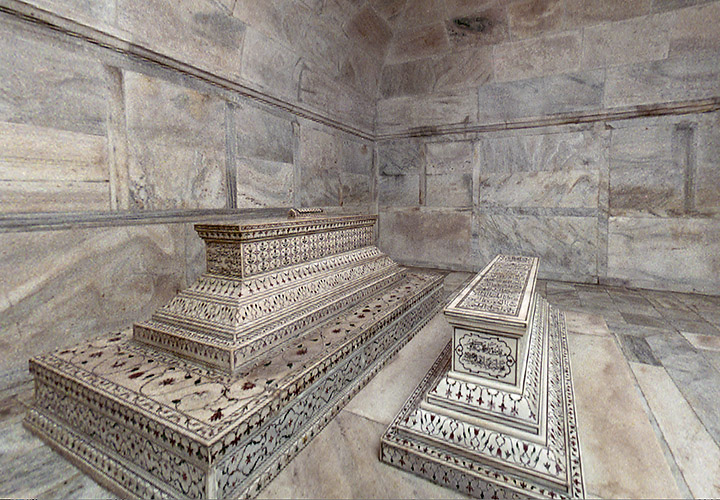
The actual tombs of Mumtaz Mahal and Shah Jahan in the lower level of Taj Mahal

== Contributions to architecture ==
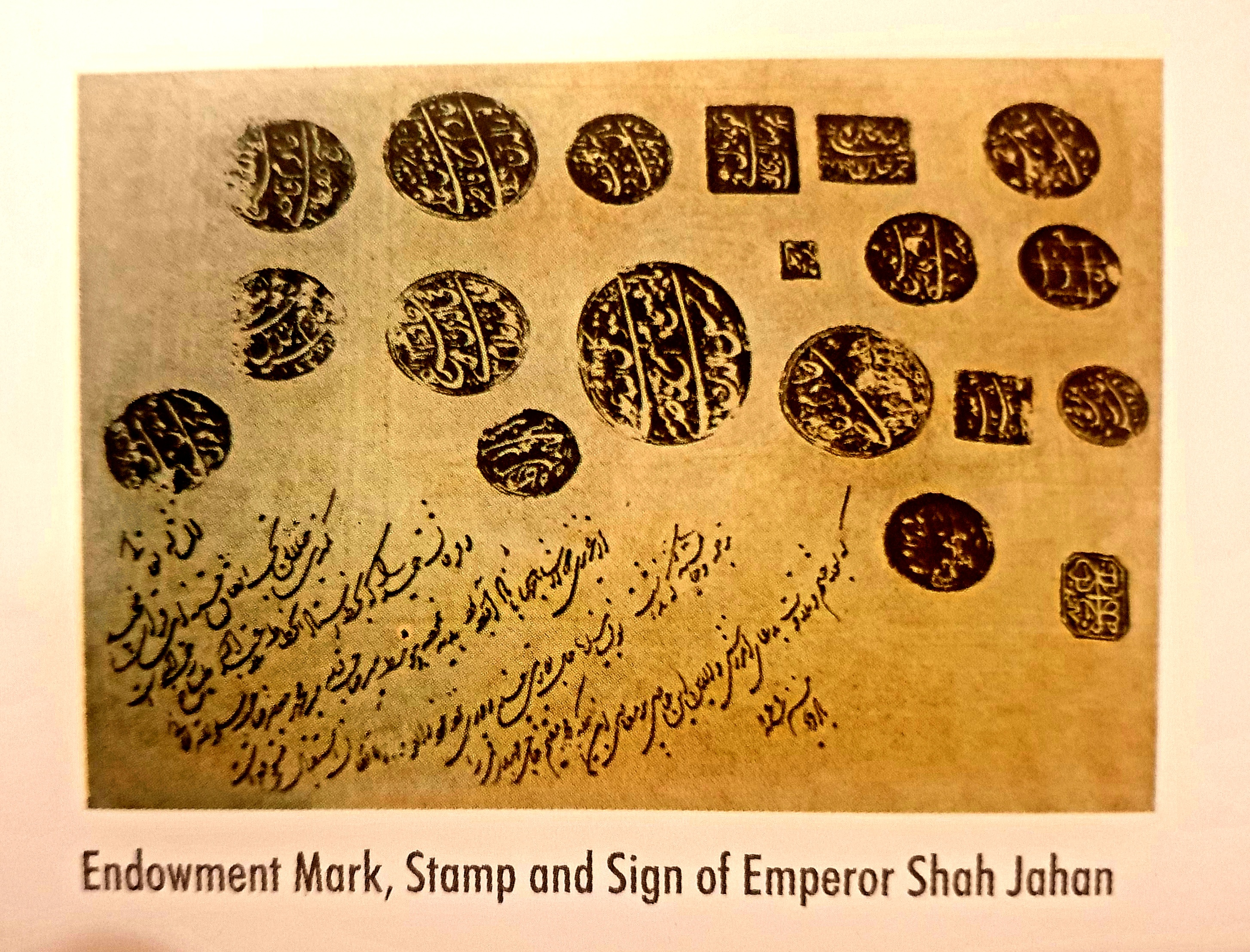
Imperial seals of Shah Jahan

Shah Jahan left behind a grand legacy of structures constructed during his reign. He was one of the greatest patrons of Mughal architecture. His reign ushered in the golden age of Mughal architecture. His most famous building was the Taj Mahal, which he built out of love for his wife, the empress Mumtaz Mahal. His relationship with Mumtaz Mahal has been heavily adapted into Indian art, literature and cinema. Shah Jahan personally owned the royal treasury, and several precious stones, such as the Kohinoor.

Its structure was drawn with great care, and architects from all over the world were called for this purpose. The building took twenty years to complete and was constructed from white marble underlaid with brick. Upon his death, his son Aurangzeb had him interred in it next to Mumtaz Mahal. Among other constructions from his reign are the Red Fort, also called the Delhi Fort or Lal Qila in Urdu, large sections of Agra Fort, the Jama Masjid, the Wazir Khan Mosque, the Moti Masjid, the Shalimar Gardens, sections of the Lahore Fort, the Mahabat Khan Mosque in Peshawar, the Mini Qutub Minar in Hastsal, the Jahangir mausoleum – his father's tomb, the construction of which was overseen by his stepmother Nur Jahan and the Shahjahan Mosque. He also had the Peacock Throne, Takht e Taus, made to celebrate his rule. Shah Jahan also placed profound verses of the Quran on his masterpieces of architecture.

The Shah Jahan Mosque in Thatta, Sindh province of Pakistan (100 km / 60 miles from Karachi) was built during the reign of Shah Jahan in 1647. The mosque is built with red bricks with blue coloured glaze tiles, probably imported from another Sindh's town of Hala. The mosque has overall 93 domes, and it is the world's largest mosque having such a number of domes. It has been built keeping acoustics in mind. A person speaking inside one end of the dome can be heard at the other end when the speech exceeds 100 decibels. It has been on the tentative UNESCO World Heritage List since 1993.

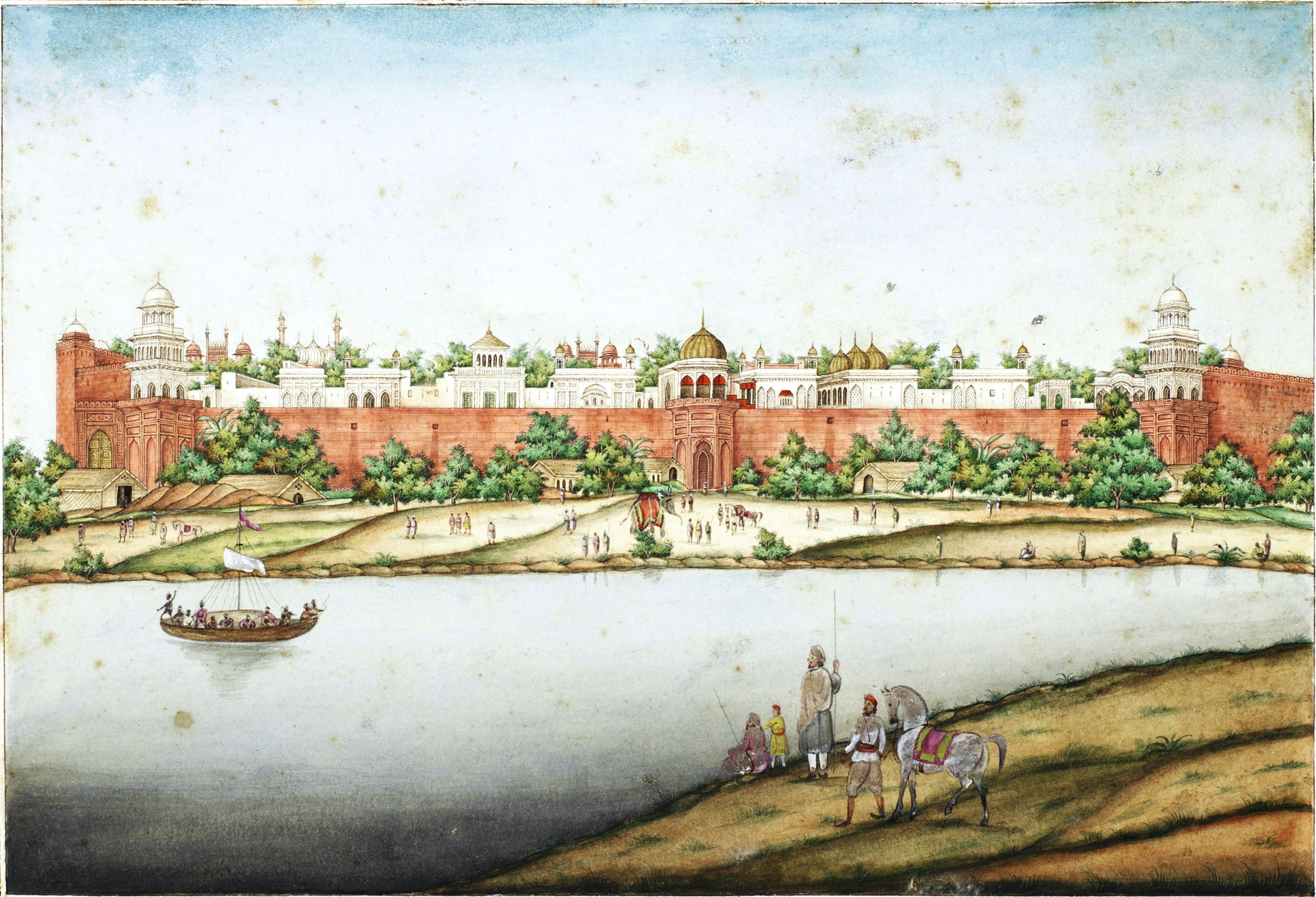
Red Fort

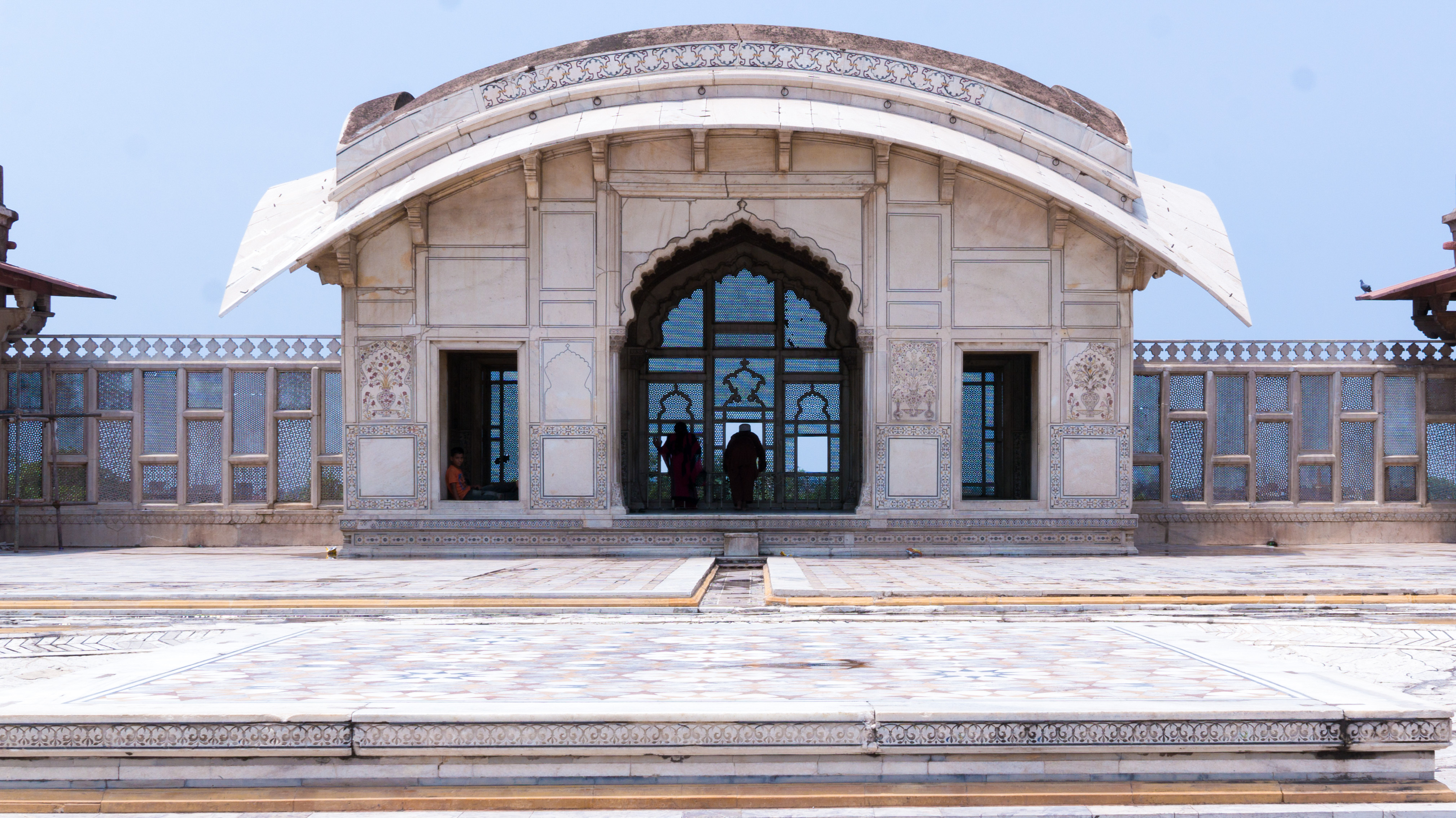
The Naulakha Pavilion at the Lahore Fort was built during the reign of Shah Jahan.

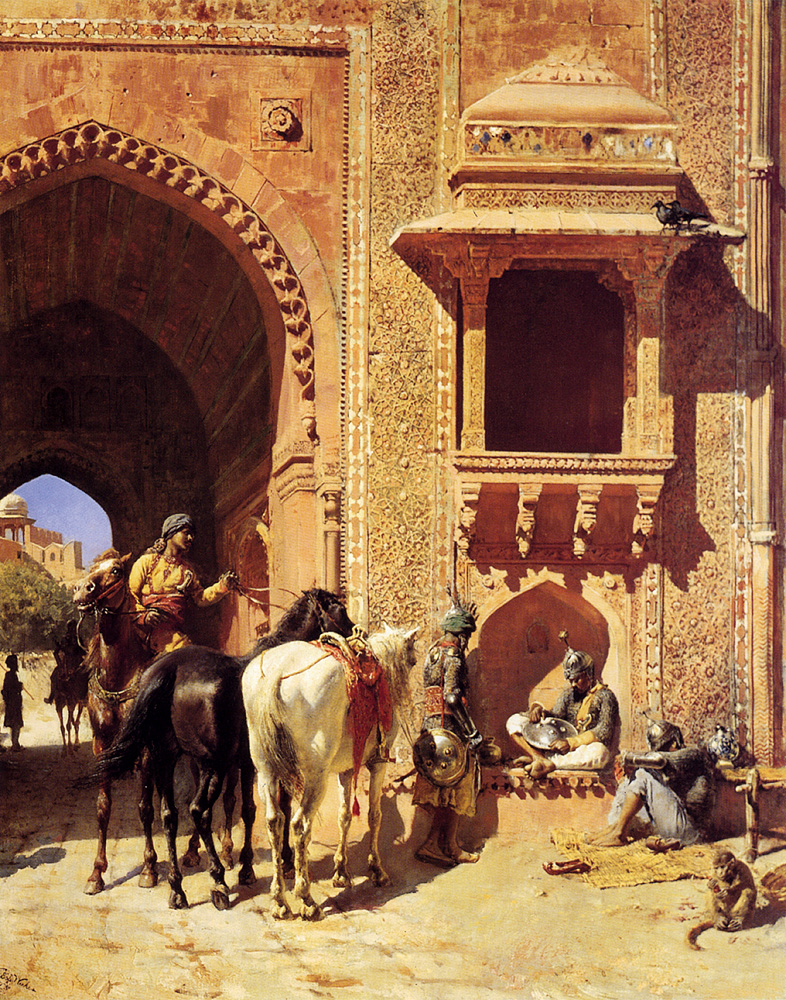
Agra Fort

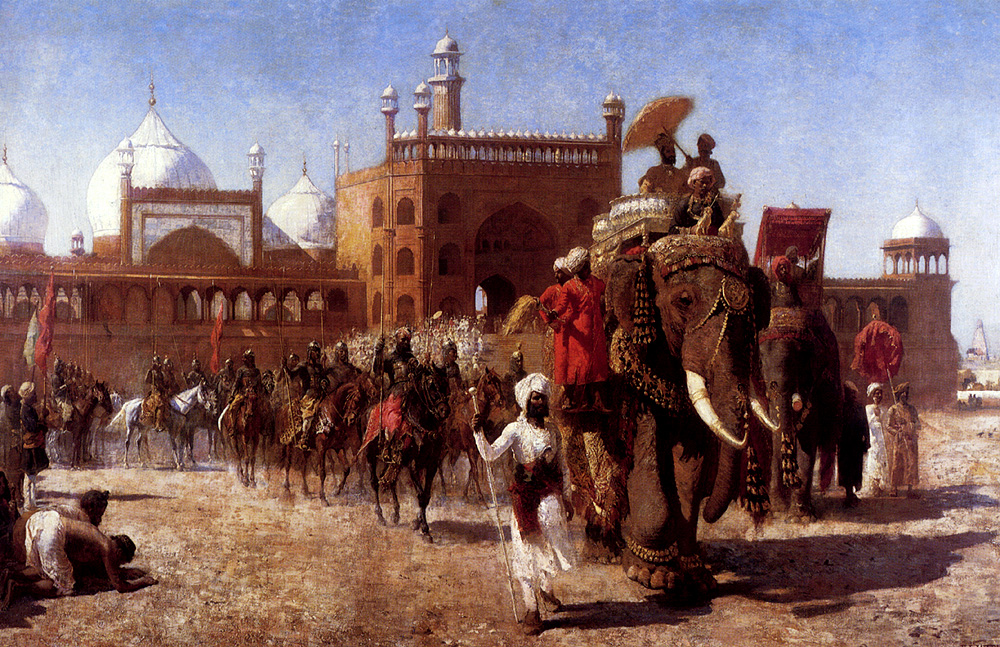
Shah Jahan and the Mughal Army return after attending a congregation in the Jama Masjid, Delhi.

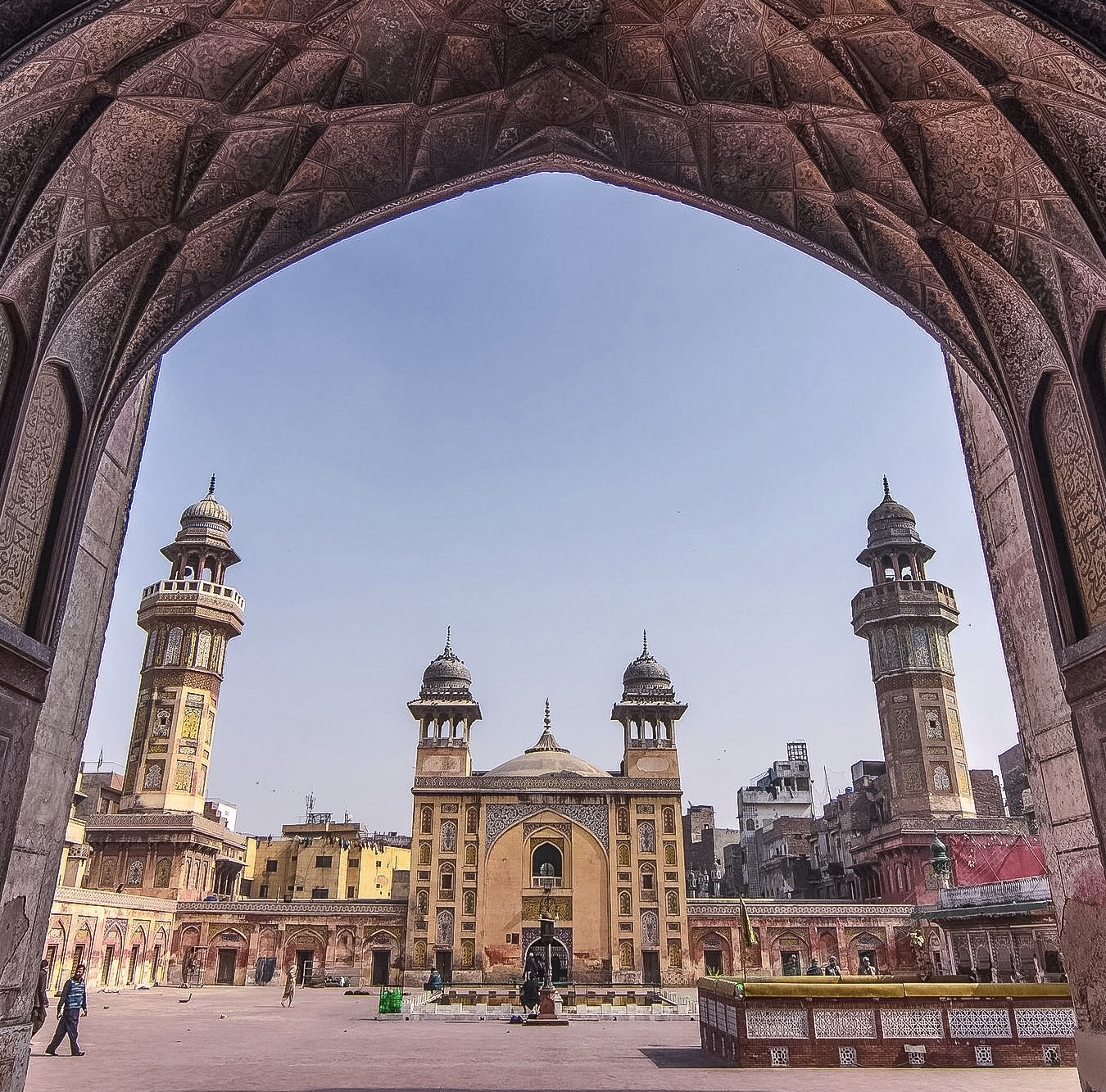
Lahore's Wazir Khan Mosque is considered to be the most ornate Mughal-era mosque.

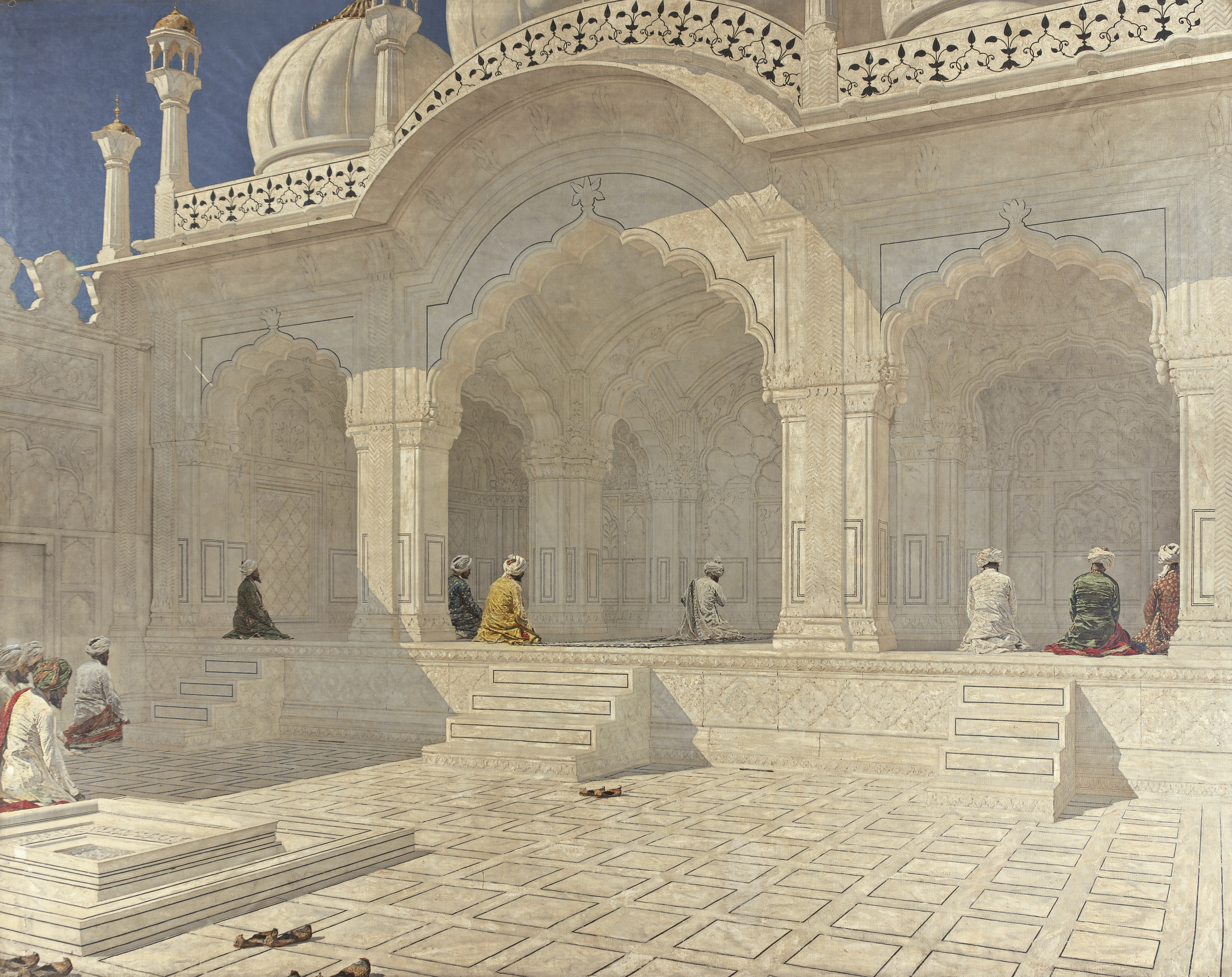
Moti Masjid (Red Fort)

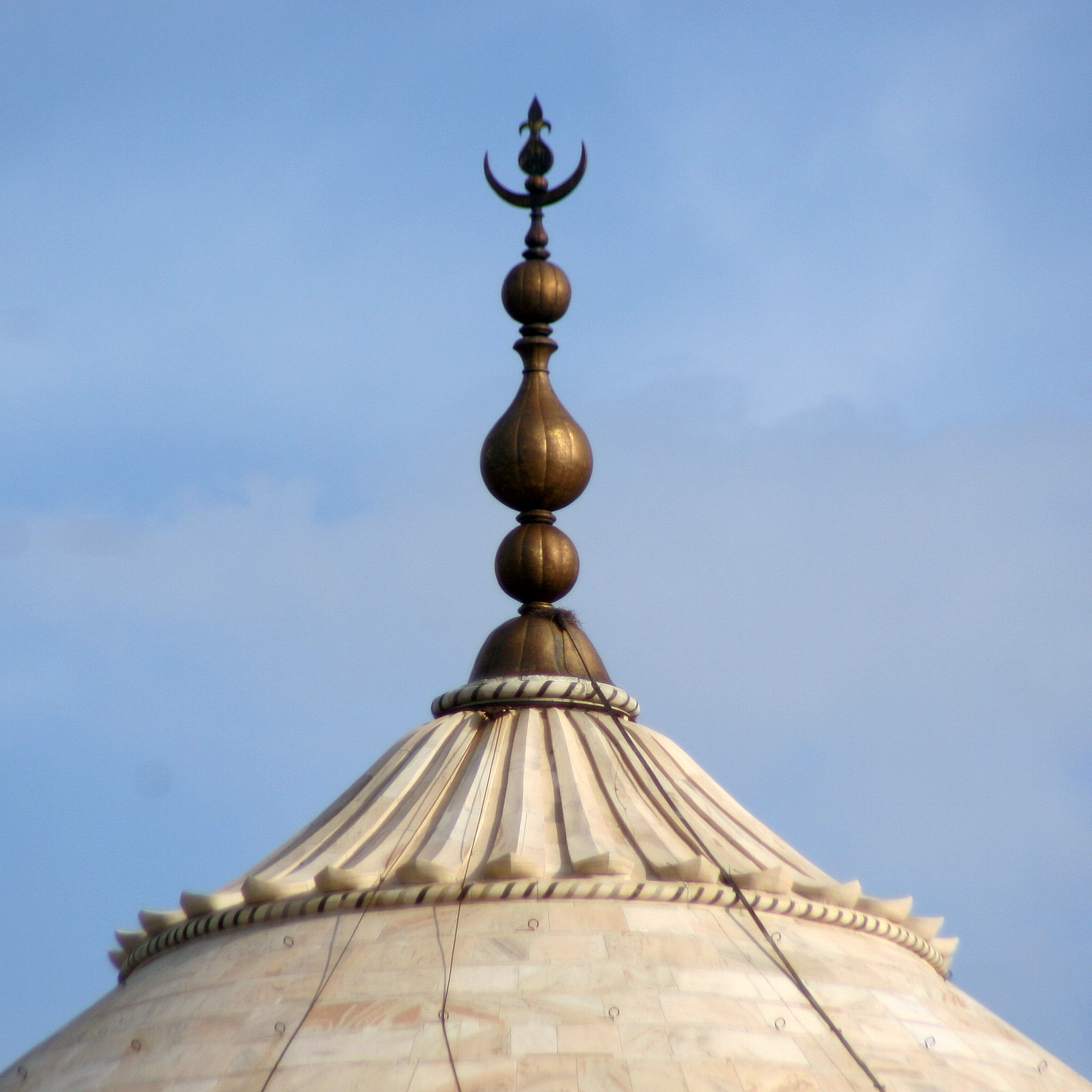
Finial, Tamga of the Mughal Empire (combining a crescent and a spear pendant with the word "Allah")

== Coins ==
Shah Jahan continued striking coins in three metals: gold (mohur), silver (rupee) and copper (dam). His pre-accession coins bear the name Khurram.

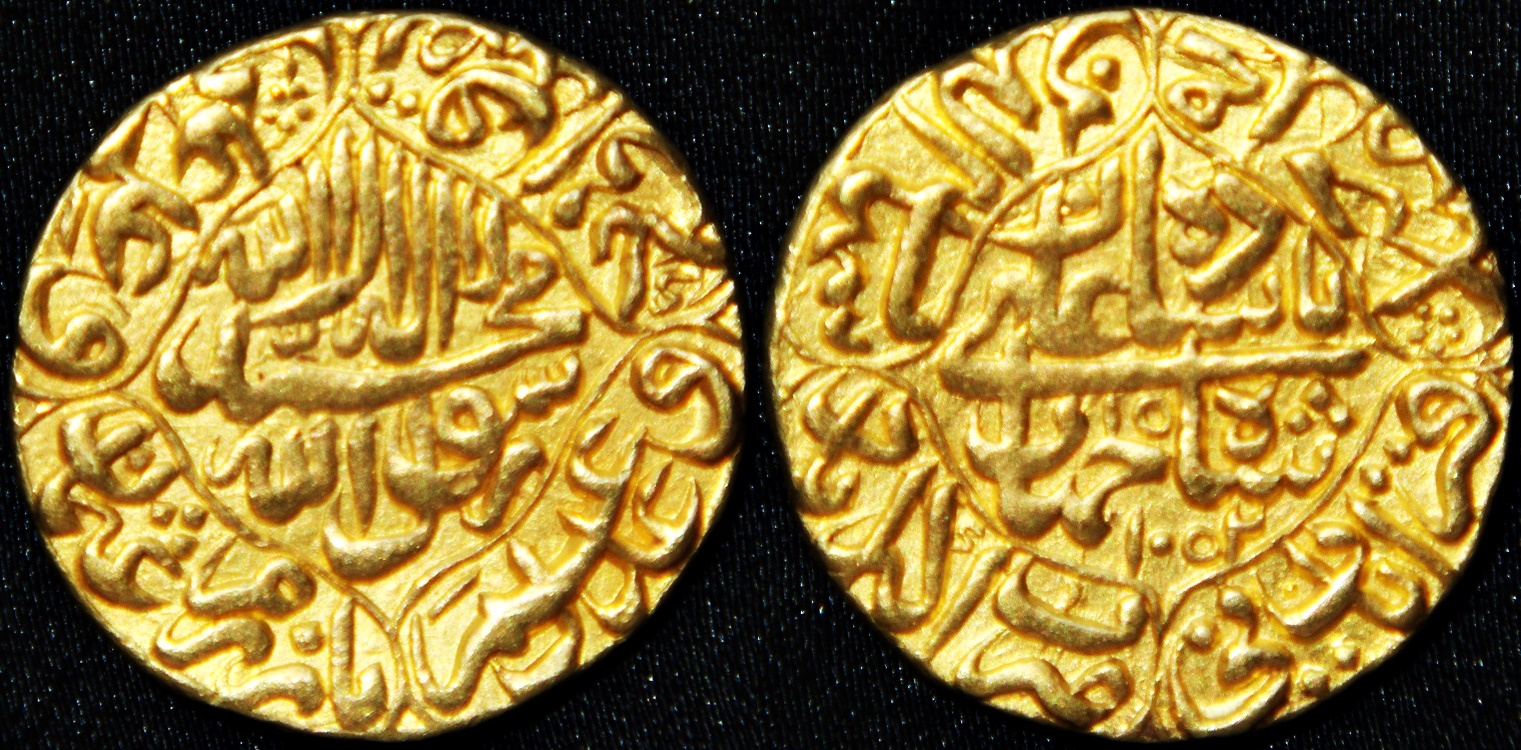
Gold mohur from Akbarabad (Agra)

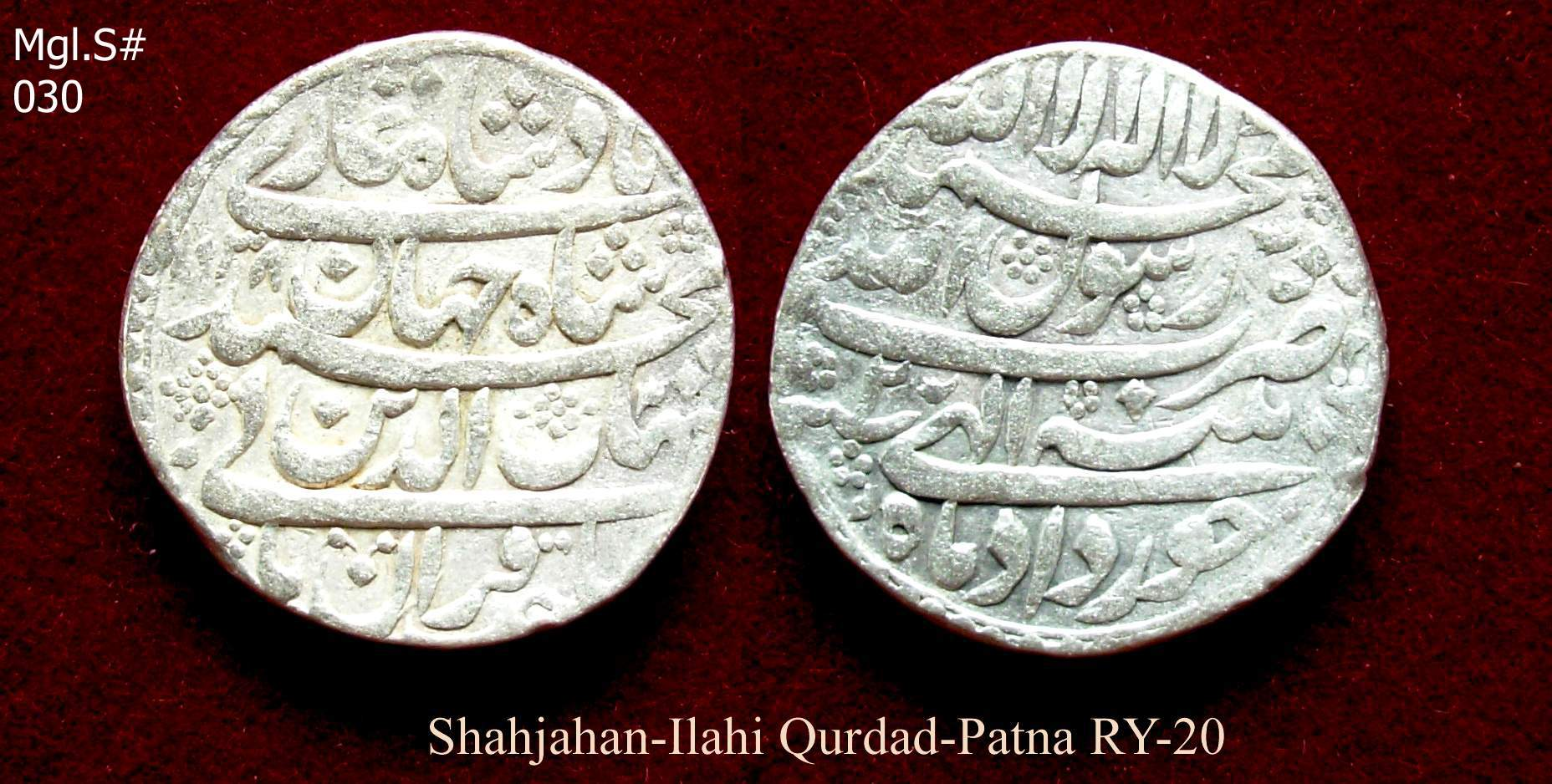
Silver rupee coin of Shah Jahan, from Patna

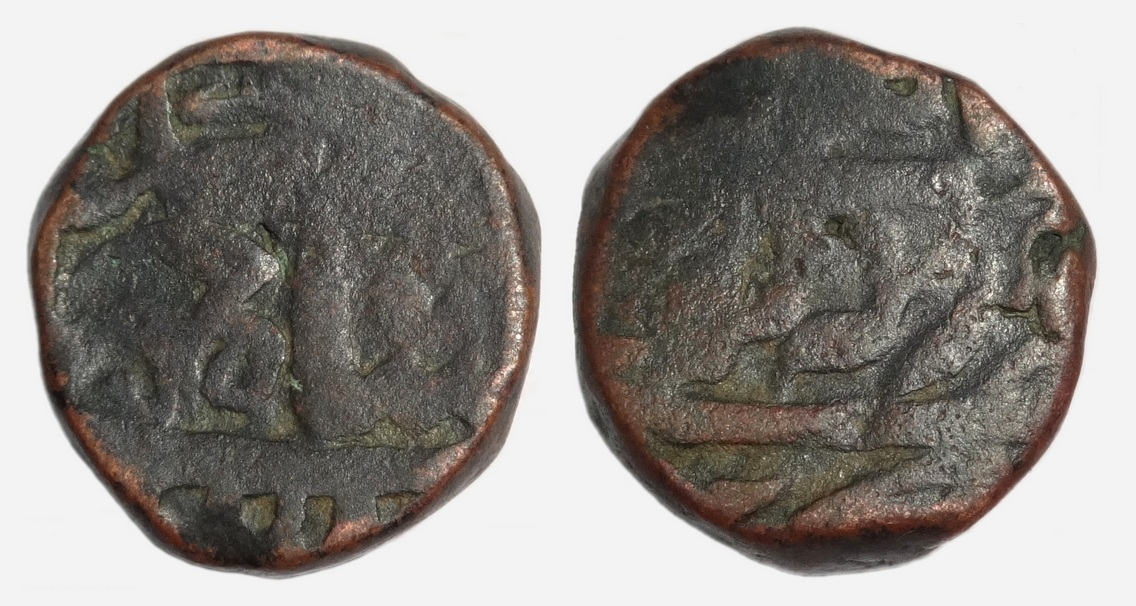
Copper dam from Daryakot mint

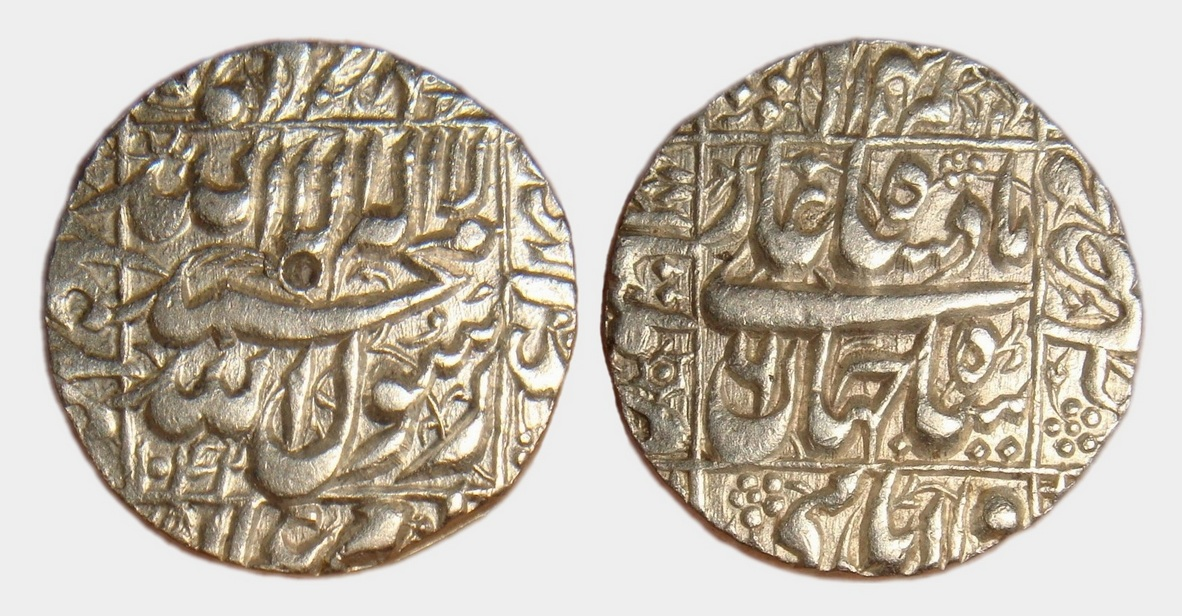
Silver rupee from Multan

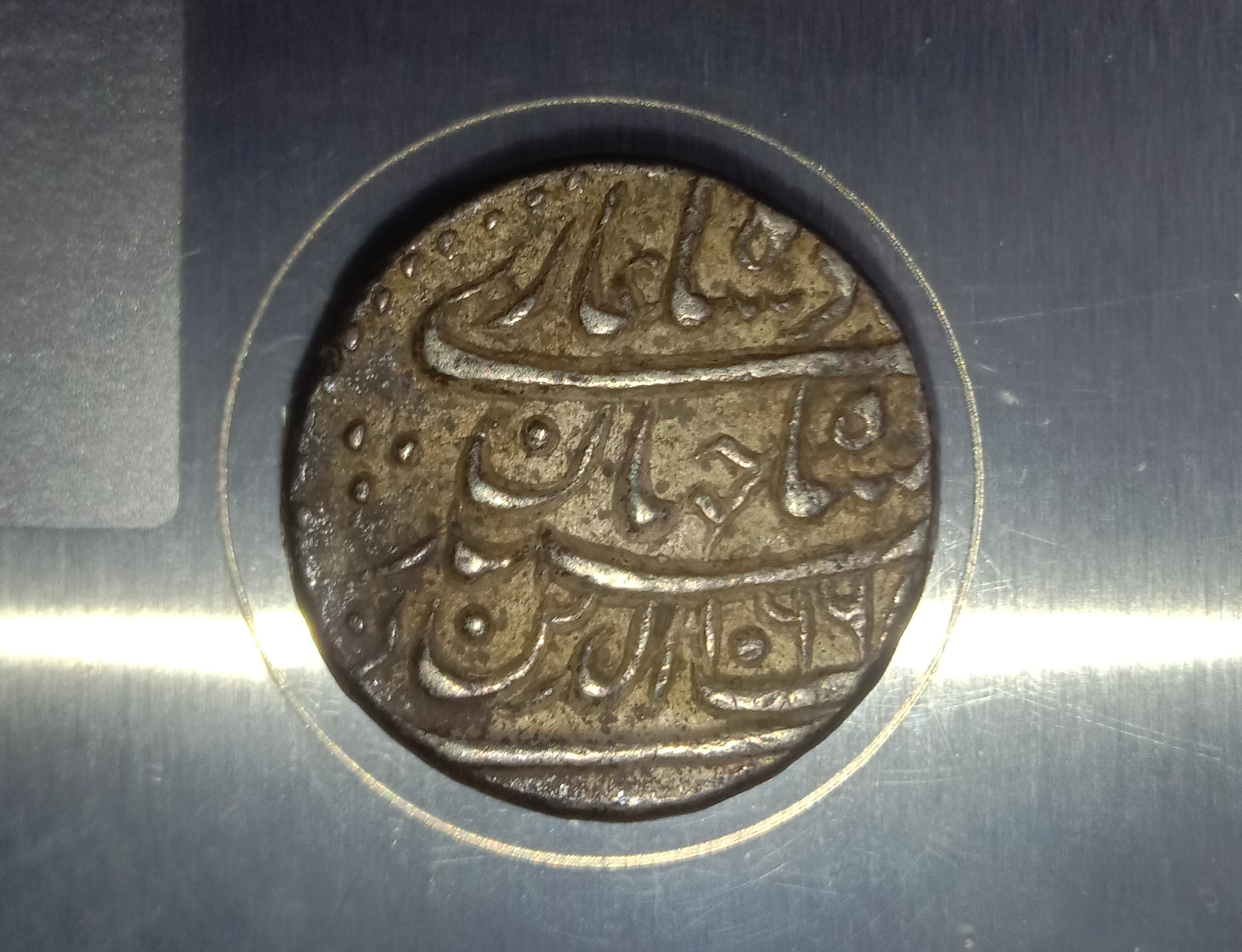
Silver rupee of Mughal emperor Shah Jahan, struck in Tatta, 1044 AH (1635 AD)

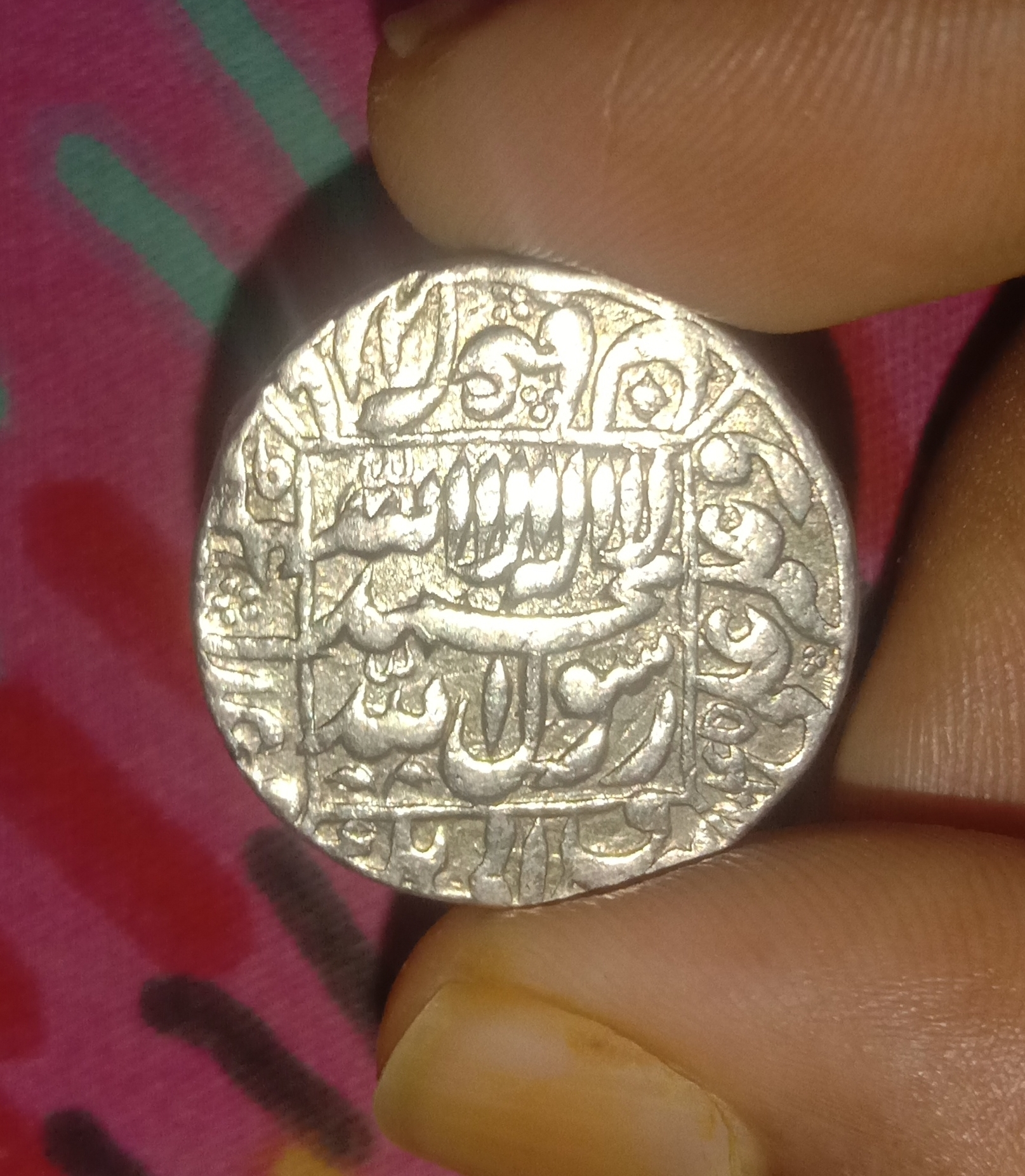
Silver rupee coin of Shah Jahan, struck in Patna mint, 1044 AH, 1635 AD, Regnal Year 8

Styles of Shah Jahan
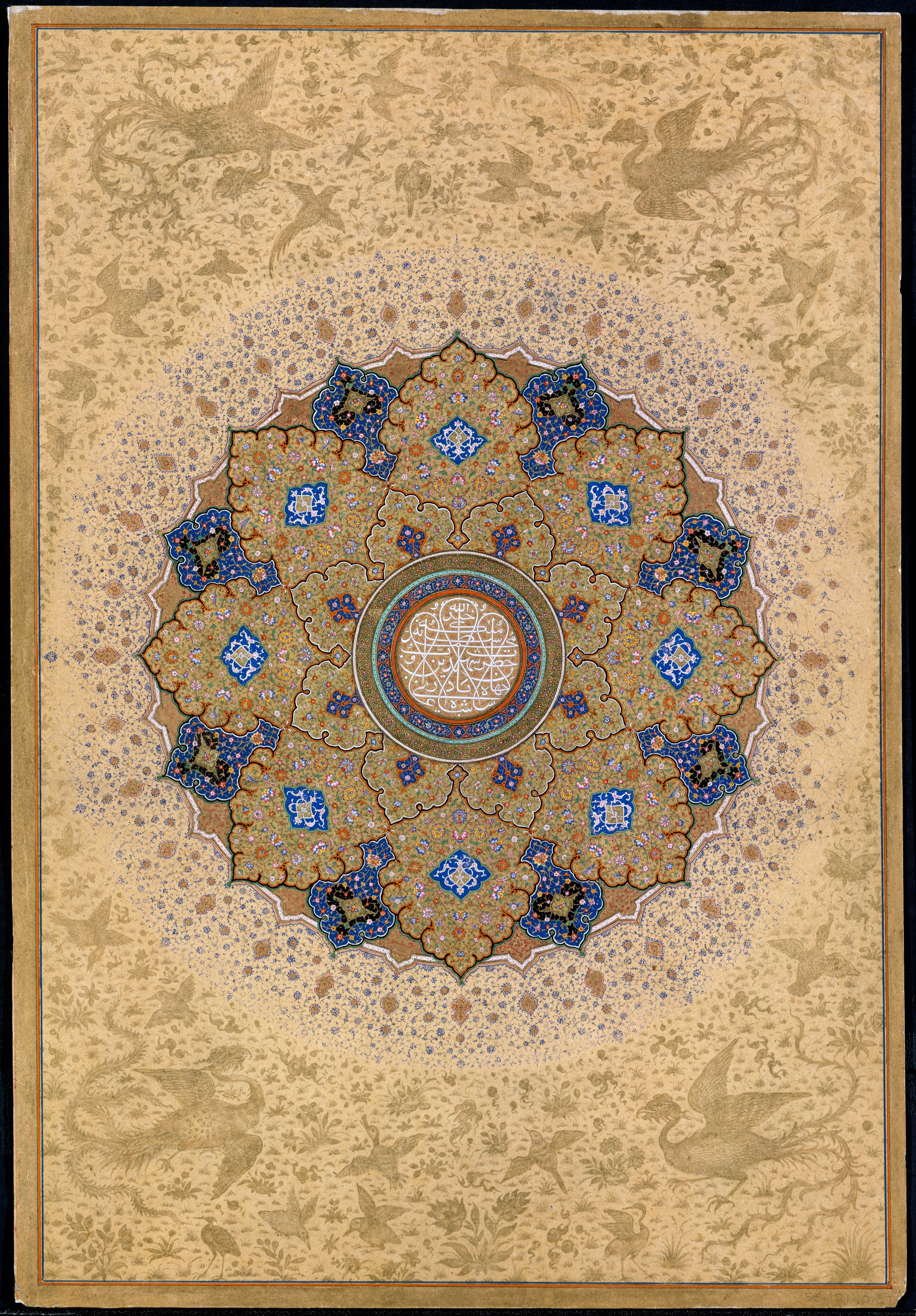
- Reference style: Shahanshah
- Spoken style: His Imperial Majesty
- Alternative style: Alam Pana

== Issue ==
Name	Birth	Death	Notes
By Kandahari Begum (c. 1593 – unknown)
Parhez Banu Begum	21 August 1611	1675	Shah Jahan's first child and only child of Kandahari Begum. She died unmarried.
By Mumtaz Mahal (27 April 1593 – 17 June 1631)
Hur-ul-Nisa Begum	30 March 1613	5 June 1616	First of fourteen children with Mumtaz Mahal. Died of smallpox at age 3.
Jahanara Begum	23 March 1614	16 September 1681	Shah Jahan's favourite and most influential daughter; became First Lady (Padshah Begum) after Mumtaz Mahal's death; died unmarried.
Dara Shikoh	20 March 1615	30 August 1659	Eldest son and heir-apparent; killed by younger brother Aurangzeb after war of succession; married and had issue.
Shah Shuja	23 June 1616	7 February 1661	Survived the war of succession; married and had issue.
Roshanara Begum	3 September 1617	11 September 1671	Influential daughter after Jahanara; sided with Aurangzeb in the succession war; died unmarried.
Aurangzeb	3 November 1618	3 March 1707	Succeeded his father as sixth Mughal emperor after winning the succession war.
Izad Bakhsh	18 December 1619	February/March 1621	Died in infancy.
Surayya Banu Begum	10 June 1621	28 April 1628	Died of smallpox at age 7.
Unnamed son	1622	1622	Died soon after birth.
Murad Bakhsh	8 October 1624	14 December 1661	Killed in 1661 by Aurangzeb; married and had issue.
Lutf Allah	4 November 1626	13 May 1628	Died at age 1½.
Daulat Afza	8 May 1628	13 May 1629	Died in infancy.
Husnara Begum	23 April 1629	1630	Died in infancy.
Gauhara Begum	17 June 1631	1706	Mumtaz Mahal died during childbirth; Gauhara died unmarried.
By Izz-un-Nissa (unknown – 28 January 1678)
Jahan Afroz	25 June 1619	March 1621	Only child of Izz-un-Nissa; died aged 1 year 9 months.

== Inscriptions ==
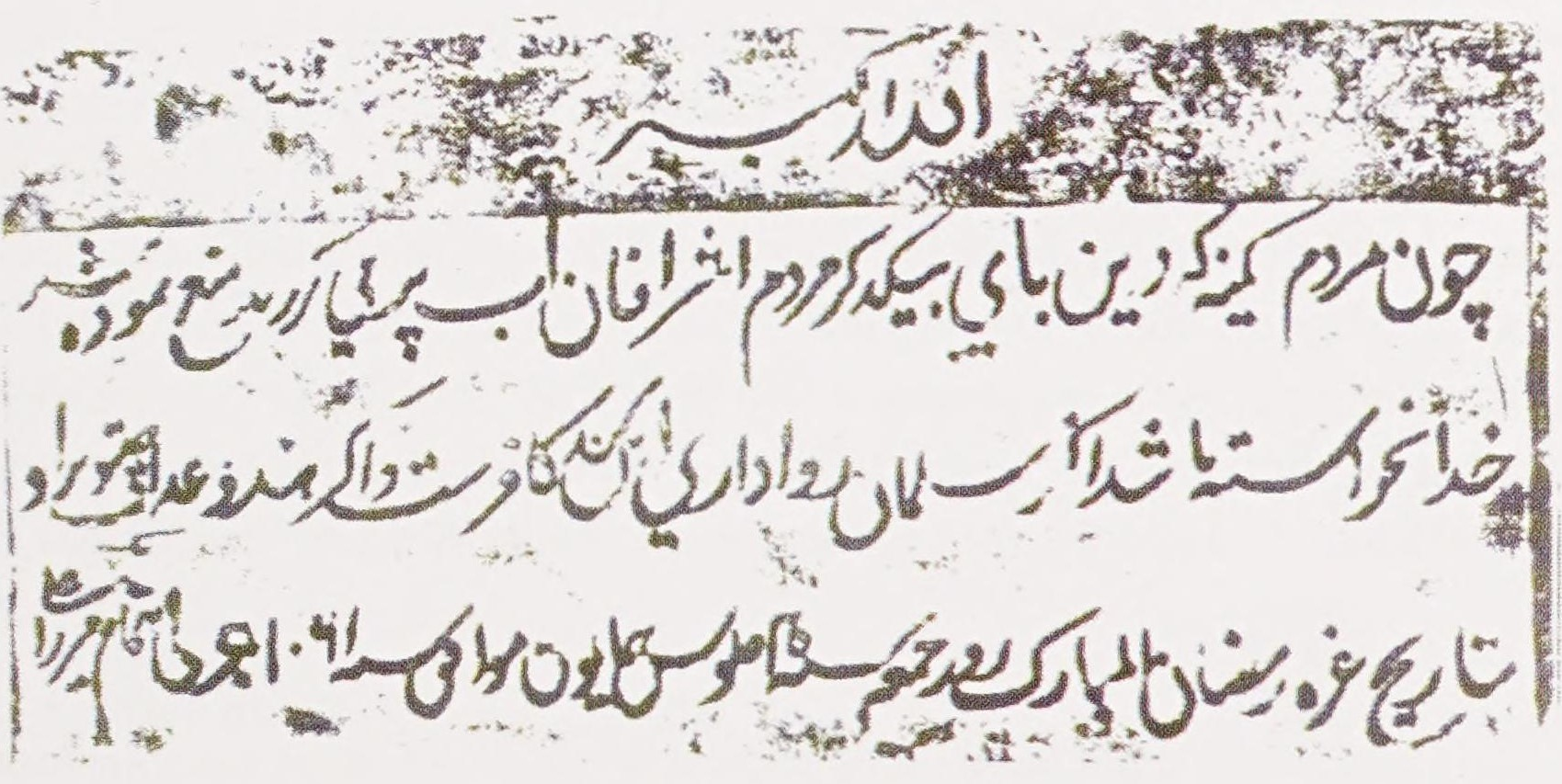
Shah Jahan inscription from a well at Makrana, Rajasthan

The inscription from Makrana, Nagaur District, dating back to 1651 AD, mentions Mirza Ali Baig, who was likely a local governor under Shah Jahan's rule. It describes a notice he posted on a step-well, prohibiting low-caste individuals from using the well alongside higher-caste people.

== In popular culture ==
=== Films and TV serials ===
- 1946 : Shahjehan, 1946 Indian film about the emperor where he was played by Kanwar.
- 1955 : Adl-E-Jehangir film where he was played by Darpan.
- 1963 : Taj Mahal (1963 film) where he was played by Pradeep Kumar.
- 2005 : Taj Mahal: An Eternal Love Story where he was played by Kabir Bedi.
- 2011-2012 : Veer Shivaji where he was played by Raza Murad.
- 2014 : Siyaasat where he was played by Devansh Dixit.
- 2023: Taj: Divided by Blood, broadcast on ZEE5, where he was played by Mitansh Lulla.
- 2026 : Raja Shivaji where he was played by Fardeen Khan.

== See also ==
- Shah Jahan II
- Shah Jahan III
- Wine cup of Shah Jahan

== Notes ==
Shah Jahan Timurid dynasty Born: 5 January 1592 Died: 22 January 1666
Regnal titles
Preceded by Jahangir	Mughal Emperor; 1627–1658	Succeeded by Aurangzeb
