= Lilavati Bai =

Wife of Mughal emperor Shah Jahan

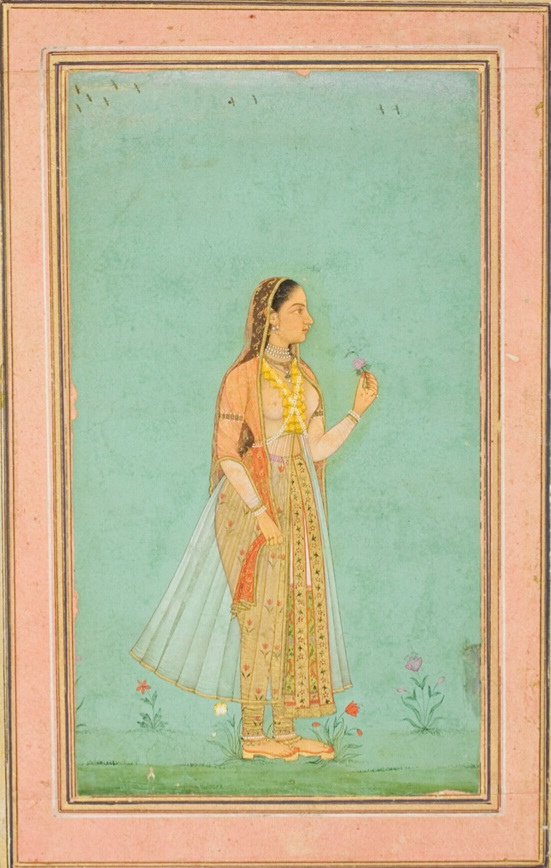
- Portrait of a consort, likely Lilavati Bai, holding a flower, c.1640-1660
- Born: Kunwari Lilavati Deiji Jodhpur, Kingdom of Marwar
- Died: Agra, Mughal Empire
- Spouse: Shah Jahan
- House: Rathore (by birth) Timurid (by marriage)
- Father: Kunwar Sakat Singh (Kunwar Shakti Singh)
- Religion: Hinduism

Lilavati Bai was a consort of the Mughal emperor Shah Jahan. She was his fourth wife and married him amidst his rebellion as a prince.

== Family ==
By birth, Lilavati Bai was a princess of Marwar, and was the daughter of Kunwar Sakat Singh. Her paternal grandparents were Raja Udai Singh and his consort, Sajjabai who belonged to the Solanki clan.

== Marriage ==
Lilavati Bai entered the imperial harem during the turbelent period of Shah Jahan's rebellion when he was a prince. The rebellion of Prince Khurram against his father Jahangir started in 1622, when Empress Nur Jahan was at the helm of affairs during the siege of Kandahar. Khurram resented the influence that the Empress had on his father and disobeyed the orders to march to Kandahar, causing the city to get lost to the Persian troops after a 45 day siege. In 1622, he raised an army against Jahangir, but was defeated at Bilochpur in 1623. He later took refuge at Udaipur in the Kingdom of Mewar, and later the Kingdom of Marwar.

It was during this time that Princess Lilavati Bai, the daughter of Kunwar Sakat Singh, was married to Shah Jahan. The marriage took place at Jodhpur and was celebrated with great festivities. It strengthened the political relationship between Marwar and the Mughal Empire, furthermore with the fact that Khurram's mother, Jagat Gosain was also from the Rathore clan. According to court chronicler Inayat Khan, the relationship Shah Jahan had with his other wives was incomparable to his favorite consort Mumtaz Mahal, and "The intimacy, deep affection, and favour which his Majesty had for the Cradle of Excellence (Mumtaz Mahal) exceeded by a thousand times what he felt for any other." Lilavati Bai thus most likely shared a perfunctory relationship in their marriage.
