= Sulaiman Shikoh =

Mughal prince (1635–1662)

- Shahzada of the Mughal Empire; Mirza
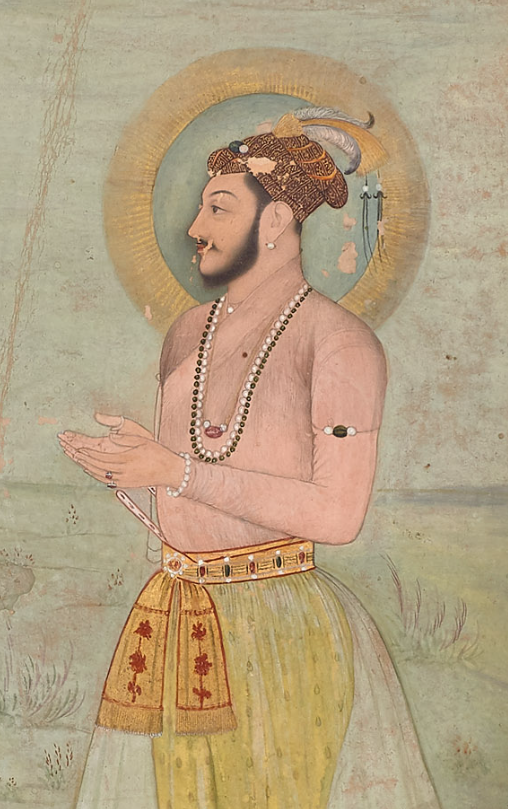
- Prince Sulaiman Shikoh, c. 1652
- Born: 15 March 1635; Sultanpur, Mughal Empire
- Died: 16 May 1662 (aged 27); Gwalior Fort, Mughal Empire
- Burial: June 1662; Traitor's Cemetery, Gwalior, India
- Spouse: Anup Kanwar Bai (m. 1654)
- Issue: Junaid Izaad Shikoh Ibaad Shikoh Miah Muhammad Akbar Salima Banu Begum; Fahima Banu Begum
Names
- Mirza Sulaiman Shikoh
- House: Mughal dynasty
- Dynasty: Timurid dynasty
- Father: Dara Shikoh
- Mother: Nadira Banu Begum
- Religion: Sunni Islam

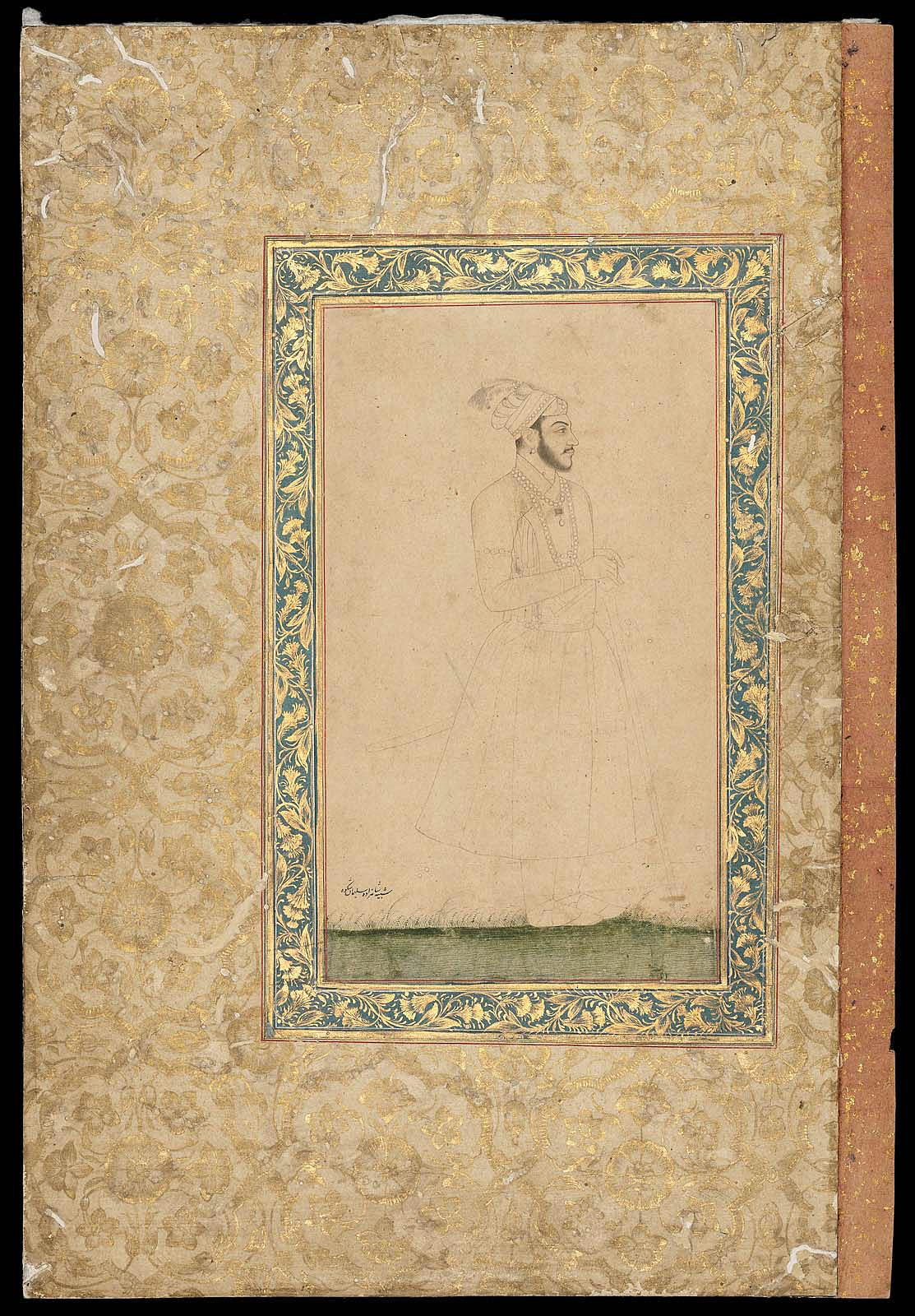
An unfinished portrait of Sulaiman Shikoh

Mirza Sulaiman Shikoh (Persian: سلیمان شکوه;15 March 1635 – 16 May 1662) was a Mughal prince and the eldest son of crown prince Dara Shikoh. He was executed in May 1662 at Gwalior Fort on the orders of his paternal uncle, Emperor Aurangzeb.

== Early life ==
Sulaiman Shikoh was born on 15 March 1635 to Prince Dara Shikoh and his wife Nadira Banu Begum. His mother was a Mughal princess and daughter of Parviz Mirza (son of Jahangir) and his first consort Jahan Begum. He was also the first grandchild of the then 43 year-old emperor, Shah Jahan. His paternal aunts included Jahanara Begum, Roshanara Begum and Gauharara Begum. His paternal uncles were Shah Shuja, Murad Bakhsh and Aurangzeb.

He was called "Potay Miya" by his grandfather Shah Jahan. Sulaiman Shikoh had three brothers and three sisters, among Mumtaz Shikoh, Sipihr Shikoh and Jahanzeb Begum.

In 1642, his father Dara Shikoh became the heir apparent to the Mughal throne.

== Refuge in Kingdom of Kumaon and Kingdom of Garhwal ==
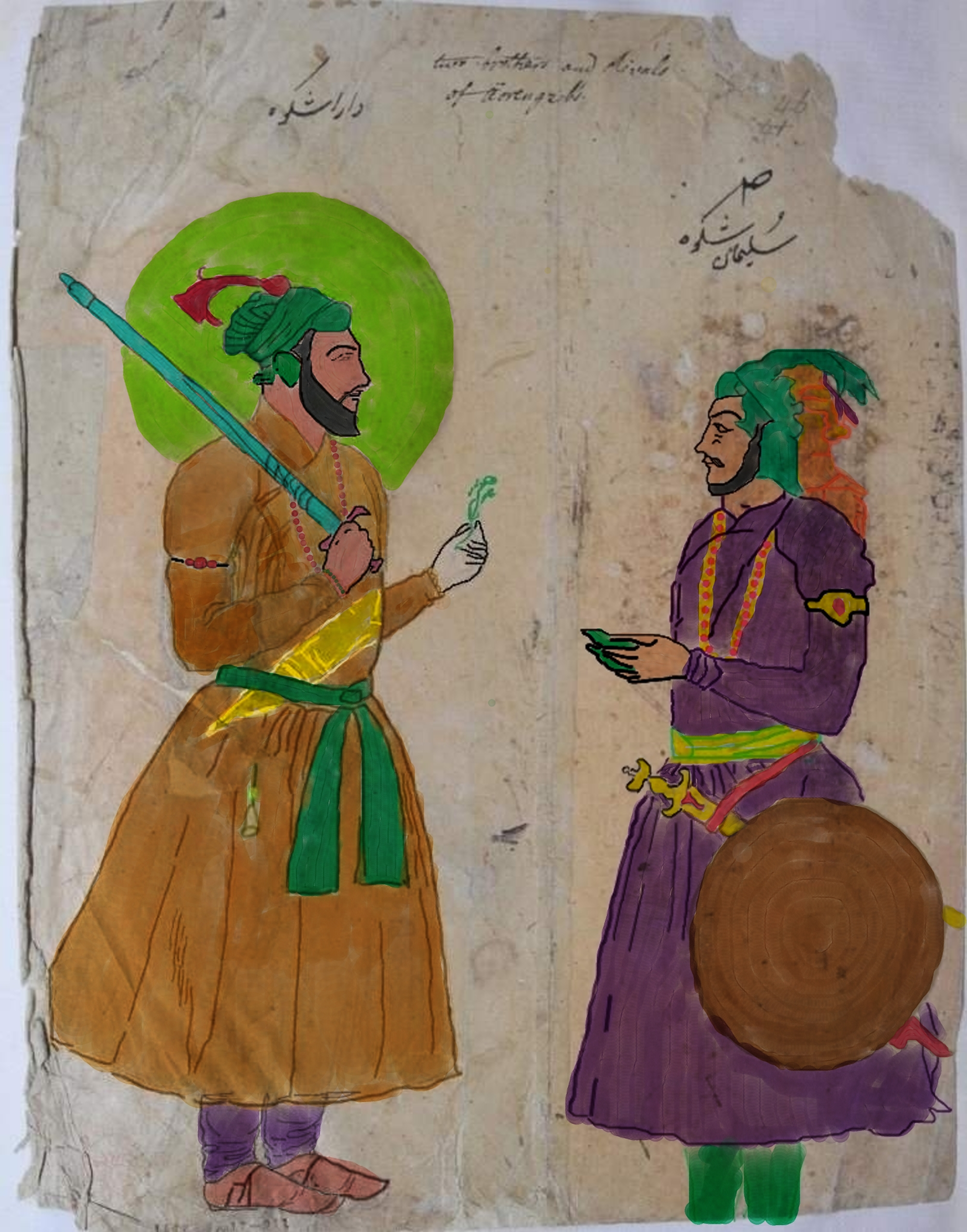
Dara Shikoh (left) and Sulaiman Shikoh

After the defeat of Dara Shikoh at the battle of Samugarh on 29 May 1658, Sulaiman Shikoh fled to Kumaon and begged for shelter from King Baz Bahadur Chand. The king first warmly entertained him but later on finding him against the Mughal Emperor, his ally, he gave him many presents and wealth and sent him to Garhwal.

Suleiman Shikoh took refuge in Garhwal in 1659 A.D. Aurangzeb had spared the daughters and minor sons of his brothers, but as Dara Shikoh's heir, Sulaiman Shikoh was a threat.

According to Muntakhab-al Lubab, "Suleiman Shikoh had sought refuge with the zamindar of Srinagar". Tavernier has also referred to Suleiman Shikoh's escape to Garhwal, but he has mixed the two incidents in one, i.e. of 'Nak-kati-Rani' and of Suleiman Shikoh's taking refuge in Garhwal. He has stated:

Aurangzeb ordered troops to advance towards the mountains of Srinagar in order to compel Raja Nakti Rani to put Suleiman Shikoh in his power. But the Raja ... rendered all Aurangzeb's efforts futile who thereupon had recourse to ruse, seeing that force availed nothing.

In the footnote, the translator V. Ball has mentioned that, "Sreenagar is the original Srinagar, the capital of Kashmir, and that the account is based upon hearsay". However, it is well known that Srinagar was the capital of the kingdom of Garhwal and it was founded by Raja Ajay Pal in 1358 A.D. In Tuzuk-i- Jahangiri, Srinagar has been referred to for the kingdom of Garhwal. Niccolao Manucci has also mentioned the name of Srinagar the capital, and the country of Srinagar, for the Garhwal kingdom. The translator's footnote that the incident is hearsay therefore cannot be accepted. According to Muntakhab- ul-Lubab, it is vividly evidenced that Suleiman Shikoh took refuge in Garhwal. The view is further supported by François Bernier, Manucci and Qanungo.

== Aurangzeb's attempts to extricate Sulaiman from Garhwal ==
Aurangzeb tasked Sulaiman Shikoh's former ally Raja Jai Singh to capture the prince. Aurangzeb sent repeated messages through Raja Jai Singh to Prithvi Pat Shah, Raja of Garhwal, to surrender the prince but his persuasion and threats were met with contempt. In the book 'Bernier's Voyage to the East Indies’ it is mentioned that:

He maketh the Raja Jesseinge write one letter after another to the Rajah Serenaguer promising him very great things, if he would surrender Suleiman Chekouh to him...The Rajah answers that he would rather lose his estate, than do so unworthy an action. And Aurangzeb, seeing his resolution, taketh the field and maketh directly to the hills ... But the Rajah laughs at all that, neither hath he more cause to fear on that side. Aurangzebe may cut long enough, they are mountains inaccessible to an army, and stones would be sufficient to stop the forces of four Hindustan, so that he was constrained to turn back again.

Manucci has also mentioned the defiant attitude of the Raja of Garhwal. The Raja wrote back to Raja Jai Singh that on no account he could harm his reputation by making over to Aurangzeb anyone who had sought his protection. He was however thankful for Raja Jai Singh's friendship, as for Aurangzeb he needed neither his promises nor his menaces. He further wrote that he might inform the Mughal that he had no respect for either his power or his victories and let him recall to mind the occasion when his father Shah Jahan sent an army to Garhwal and the survivors of that army had their noses chopped off. In the end he has commented, "let him know that he who could cut off noses could equally cut off heads."

Aurangzeb then took recourse to ruse. Dr. Qanungo is of the view that when Jai Singh could not convince the king of Garhwal to surrender Suleiman Shikoh, he instigated a powerful Brahmin minister against him who tried to give him poison in the form of medicine. But the vigilant prince tested the adulterated medicine on a cat and was saved. When the king discovered his minister's treachery he had him beheaded.

Later Jai Singh inspired the Garhwali prince Medni Shah to emulate Aurangzeb and revolt against his father.

== Capture and aftermath ==
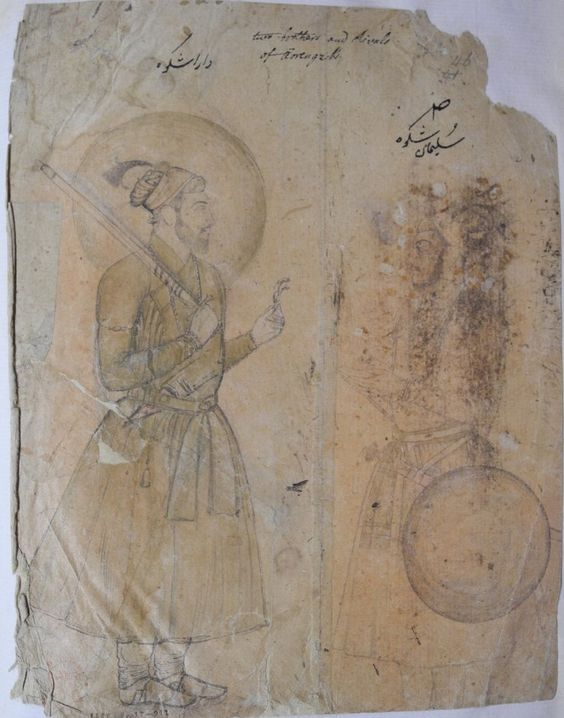
An incomplete draft showing Dara Shikoh (left) with his son Sulaiman Shikoh (right)

According to the sources of local history, the tradition goes that when Prithvi Pat Shah sentenced his minister to death, the other ministers, officials and all the members of the family became hostile to him. Thereafter, his son Medni Shah, on the advice of his ministers, revolted against his father and tried to seize power. Concomitantly, on Aurangzeb's orders, in late 1660 Jai Singh sent his son Ram Singh to Srinagar, Garhwal, to persuade the authorities to hand over Suleiman Shikoh to him, bearing the Emperor's dire threats. However, when Ram Singh met Prithvi Pat Shah, he refused to comply and told him that he will protect the Mughal prince as long as he lived.

Then Ram Singh and Medni Shah, who were friends, tried to hatch a conspiracy against Shikoh. But before they could take any action against him he discovered their motive and slipped away in the night with the intention of escaping to Tibet. The prince left a portion of his party under the care of the Garhwali King most notably the painters, Sham Das and his son Har Das, the ancestors of the garhwali painter Mola Ram

Unfortunately he lost his way in the hills and was betrayed by the villagers. They informed Medni Shah of his whereabouts who had him arrested and handed him over to Ram Singh.

Shikoh surrendered to Aurangzeb somewhere around December 1660 AD because according to Dr. Qanungo he was brought before Aurangzeb on 5 January 1661. Bernier has mentioned that,

...of Dara’s family, there now remained Soliman Chekouh, whom it would not have been easy to draw from Serenaguer if the Raja had been faithful to his engagements. But the intrigues of Jesseingue, the promises and threats of Aurengzebe, the death of Dara and the hostile preparations of the neighbouring Rajahs, shook the resolution of this pusillanimous protector.

Bernier has not detailed the circumstances in which Shikoh was surrendered and from his account it appears that Prithvi Pat Shah had to surrender to circumstances. But during the surrender it seems he was away from Srinagar, the capital of Garhwal. Bernier in his description has referred to the "hostile preparations of the neighbouring Rajahs," and Walton has mentioned that "during the reign of Pirthvi Shah the aggressions of the Kumaonis continued under the leadership of the then Raja Baz Bahadur who had already fought on the side of Khalel Ullah against the Garhwalis". It is possible that the neighbouring Raja of Kumaon must have launched an attack on the borders of Garhwal and during that period Prithvi Pat Shah had to move from Srinagar the capital to thwart the invasions of the Kumaonis.

The penitence of Raja Prithvi Pat Shah about his son's treachery indicates his innocence as regards the surrender of Shikoh. Manucci has stated:

The aged Rajah of Srinagar felt greatly the vileness of the deed carried out by his only son and so great was his sorrow that in short space be ended his days under the disgrace, saying he would sooner have lost his territory and all his wealth than that his son should be guilty of such an act of infamy.

Moreover, it seems that Medni Shah was banished from Garhwal owing to his misdeed of surrendering Shikoh. He had to leave Srinagar for Delhi on this issue where he died in 1662 A.D. His death in Delhi is corroborated by the ‘farman' which Aurangzeb sent to Prithvi Pat Shah in 1662 A.D. In the ‘farman' it is stated,

Exalted amongst the nobles Prithi Singh, the Raja of Srinagar, having the hopes of benign favours, should know that recently Medni Singh, the son of Raja Prithi Singh has passed away. He (the Raja) should have all the patience and toleration. A robe of honour having been awarded to him, for conferring favours and making him distinguished, is hereby sent along with the farman. It has been enjoined that he (the Raja) should be thankful to the Emperor and be always firm in adopting the right path of obedience and submission. The prosperity of the Empire shall be considered by him the best means for fulfilling his hopes and desires and welfare of his present and future.

This farman is preserved in the U.P. State Archives in Lucknow.

On 5 January 1661, Shikoh was brought before Aurangzeb. Accounts say that Shikoh's entry into the court, in chains, made quite an impression. Many were moved to tears at the sight of the fallen prince. Apparently, even Aurangzeb softened and offered to spare Sulaiman. The prince stoically replied that if he was a lingering threat, he should be killed immediately; he also requested that he would not be left to rot in some prison. Perhaps miffed by the rebuff, Aurangzeb did not grant his wish.

== Death ==
On Aurangzeb's orders, Shikoh was imprisoned into a dungeon in Gwalior Fort. An opium-based poison was administered everyday so that the prince would descend into madness and infirmity. Many months passed, but Shikoh somehow did not deteriorate. In May 1662, after nearly eighteen months of imprisonment, Aurangzeb resolved to end the threat forever and ordered his men to let off the prince. Suleiman Shikoh was thus exiled in the mountains but he would pass away adter few months. He was buried in the Traitor's Cemetery in Gwalior, where his uncle Murad was also buried.

== Personal life ==
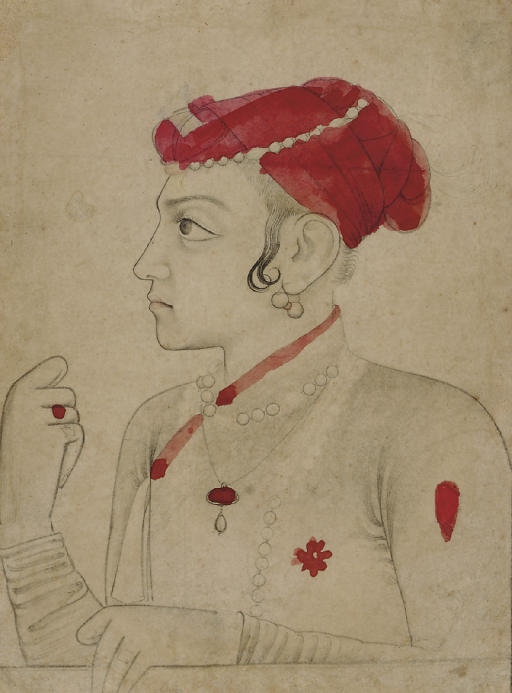
A drawing of Sulaiman Shikoh

Sulaiman's first wife was the daughter of Khwaja Abd al-Rahman, a respected nobleman and descendant of Khwaja Abd al-Aziz Naqshbandi. In July 1651, when the Mughal army arrived in the Kashmir valley, his father Prince Dara Shikoh asked Emperor Shah Jahan for permission to arrange a marriage. After receiving the emperor's approval, the marriage took place on 15 July 1651.

His second wife was Anup Kunwar Bai, the daughter of Amar Singh Rathore, the eldest son of Raja Gaj Singh of Marwar. Amar Singh was also the nephew of Raja Jai Singh. Sulaiman had been engaged to her and about a month before the wedding, Shah Jahan invited the bride to the palace and officially announced the engagement. The marriage took place on 14 April 1654. Her dowry was set at 200,000 rupees, and the marriage was performed by Qazi Khushhal in the emperor's presence.

His third wife was the daughter of Khwaja Sadiq Khan from Patna. When the bride arrived at the Mughal court, Dara Shikoh personally brought her into the palace. The marriage took place on 5 November 1656. Her dowry was set at 200,000 rupees, and the Qazi conducted the marriage ceremony in the emperor's presence.

Issue

- Salima Banu Begum (died September–October 1702), married to Prince Muhammad Akbar; They were parents to the Mughal emperor Neku Siyar;
- Fahima Banu Begum (died November–December 1706), married to Khwaja Bahauddin, son of Khwaja Parsa;

== Positions ==
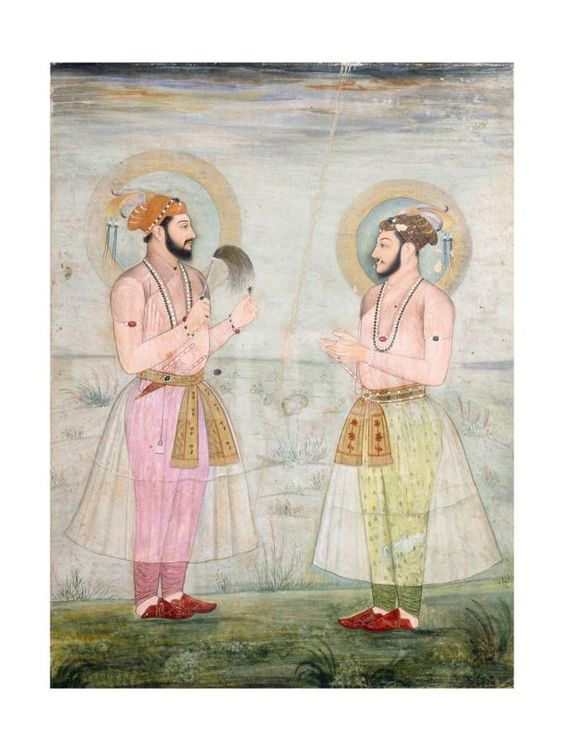
Dara Shikoh (left) with Sulaiman Shikoh

- Governor of Thatta 1649-1651
- Governor of Awadh 1655-1657
- Commander-in-Chief of Dara Shikoh's army 1641-1650

== Ancestry ==
Ancestors of Sulaiman Shikoh

16. Jalal-ud-din Muhammad Akbar, Mughal Emperor (= 24, 28)
8. Nur-ud-din Muhammad Jahangir, Mughal Emperor (= 12)
17. Mariam-uz-Zamani (= 25)
4. Shahab-ud-din Muhammad Shah Jahan I, Mughal Emperor
18. Udai Singh, Raja of Marwar
9. Jagat Gosain
19. Manrang Devi of Gwalior
2. Dara Shikoh
20. I'timad-ud-Daulah
10. Abu'l-Hasan Asaf Khan
21. Asmat Begam
5. Mumtaz Mahal
22. Ghias ud-din ‘Ali Asaf Khan
11. Diwanji Begum
1. Sulaiman Shikoh
24. Jalal-ud-din Muhammad Akbar, Mughal Emperor (= 16, 28)
12. Nur-ud-din Muhammad Jahangir, Mughal Emperor (= 8)
25. Mariam-uz-Zamani (= 17)
6. Parviz Mirza
26. Khwaja Hasan of Herat
13. Sahib-i-Jamal
3. Nadira Banu Begum
28. Jalal-ud-din Muhammad Akbar, Mughal Emperor (= 16, 24)
14. Murad Mirza
7. Jahan Banu Begum
