= Bidar Bakht =

Mughal prince (1670–1707)

Bidar Bakht بیدار بخت
- Shahzada of the Mughal Empire; Mirza
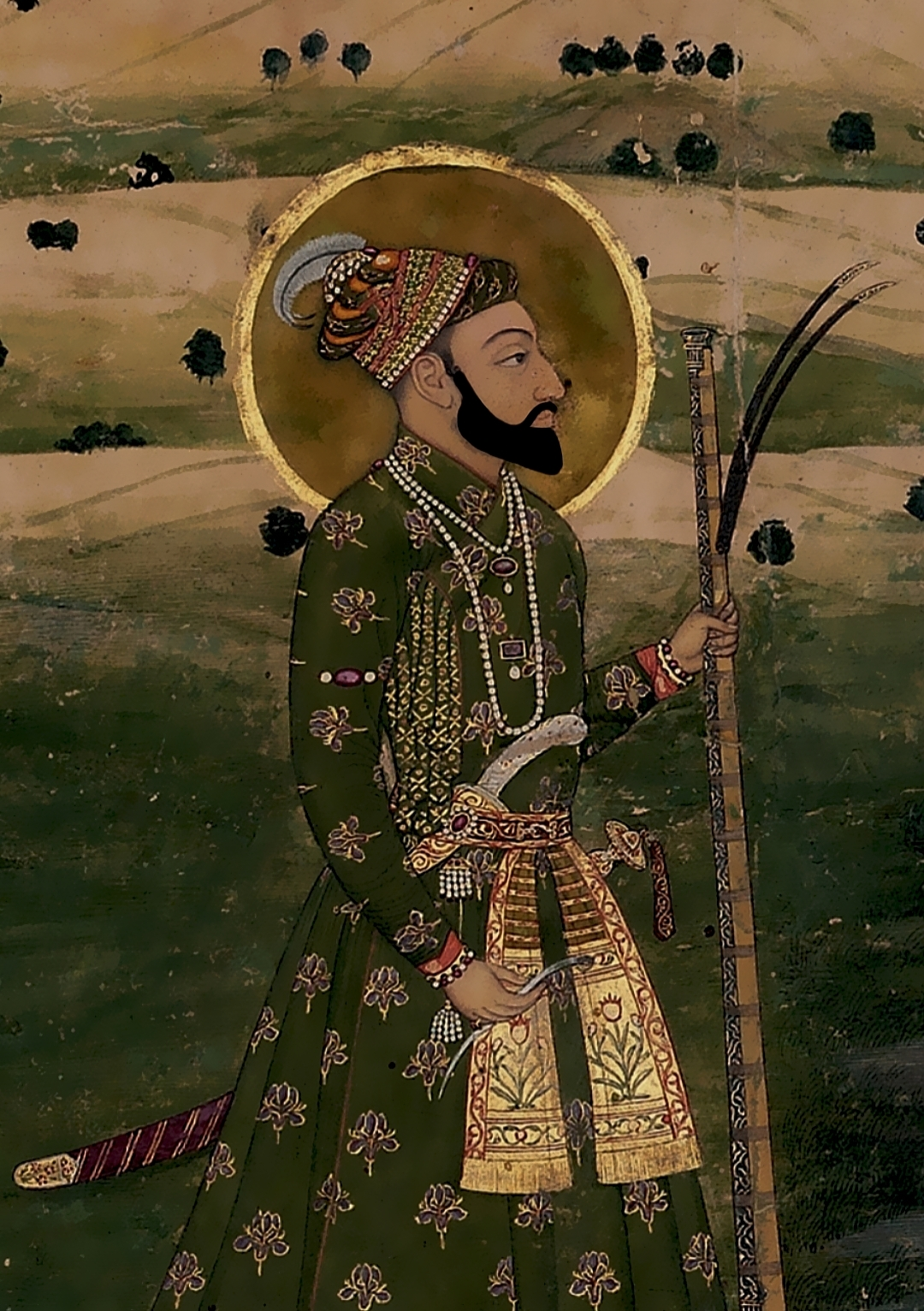
- Prince Bidar Bakht holding a matchlock c. 1705

Subahdar of Malwa
- Reign: 3 August 1704 – April 1706
- Padishah: Aurangzeb

Subahdar of Gujrat
- Reign: 1706–1707
- Padishah: Aurangzeb
- Born: 4 August 1670; Agra, Subah of Agra, Mughal Empire (present-day India)
- Died: 20 June 1707 (aged 36); Jajau, near Agra, Subah of Agra, Mughal Empire (present-day India)
- Burial: Humayun's Tomb, Delhi
- Spouses: Shams-un-Nissa Begum (m. 1686)
- Issue: Muhammad Firuz Bakht; Bidar Dil; Dindar Dil; Said Bakht; Hayatullah; Bakht Afzun Banu Begum; Bakht un-Nissa Begum
Names
- Muhammad Bidar Bakht
- House: Mughal dynasty
- Dynasty: Timurid dynasty
- Father: Azam Shah
- Mother: Jahanzeb Banu Begum
- Religion: Islam (Sunni Muslim)

Muhammad Bidar Bakht (Urdu: مُحمّد بیدار بخت; 4 August 1670 – 20 June 1707) was a Mughal prince. His father, Muhammad Azam Shah, briefly reigned as Mughal emperor in 1707. Bidar was noted for being a gallant, skillful and successful general and was regarded as the most able Mughal prince of his time. He was the favourite grandson of Emperor Aurangzeb.

From the age of seventeen, Bidar held senior military and administrative positions. One of his first actions involved storming Fort Sinsani, which was carried after fierce fighting and heavy losses. At nineteen, he led a Mughal force which defeated an invading Maratha army and pursued it for ten days. He was appointed viceroy of Aurangabad and then of Malwa alongside it. He constantly had to suppress uprisings and beat off incursions from neighbouring states. In 1707 Emperor Aurangzeb died and Bidar's father succeeded him; Bidar and his father were killed at the Battle of Jajau against Bidar's uncle Bahadur Shah I.

== Early life ==
Muhammad Bidar Bakht was born on 4 August 1670 in Agra to Prince Muhammad Azam and his wife, Jahanzeb "Jani" Banu Begum. He was named Bidar Bakht by Emperor Aurangzeb, his paternal grandfather. Bidar's mother was a Mughal princess and the daughter of Crown Prince Dara Shikoh, the deceased eldest son and heir-apparent of the previous emperor, Shah Jahan. Aurangzeb showed marks of exceptional love to Azam and Jahanzeb and to Prince Bidar Bakht, lavishing gifts on all three. Bidar Bakht was his grandfather's favourite grandson.

=== Marriage ===
At the age of sixteen, Bidar Bakht married Shams-un-Nissa Begum (surnamed Puti Begum), the daughter of Qamr-ud-din (titled Mukhtar Khan) on 3 December 1686. She belonged to the Ben-i-Mukhtar family which enjoyed great respect among Muslims. Bidar had always showed affection and favour to Shams-un-Nisa, who seems to have been proud and imperious. Shams-un-Nisa gave birth to Bidar's son, Shahzada Firuz Bakht on 23 August 1695.

== Military commander ==
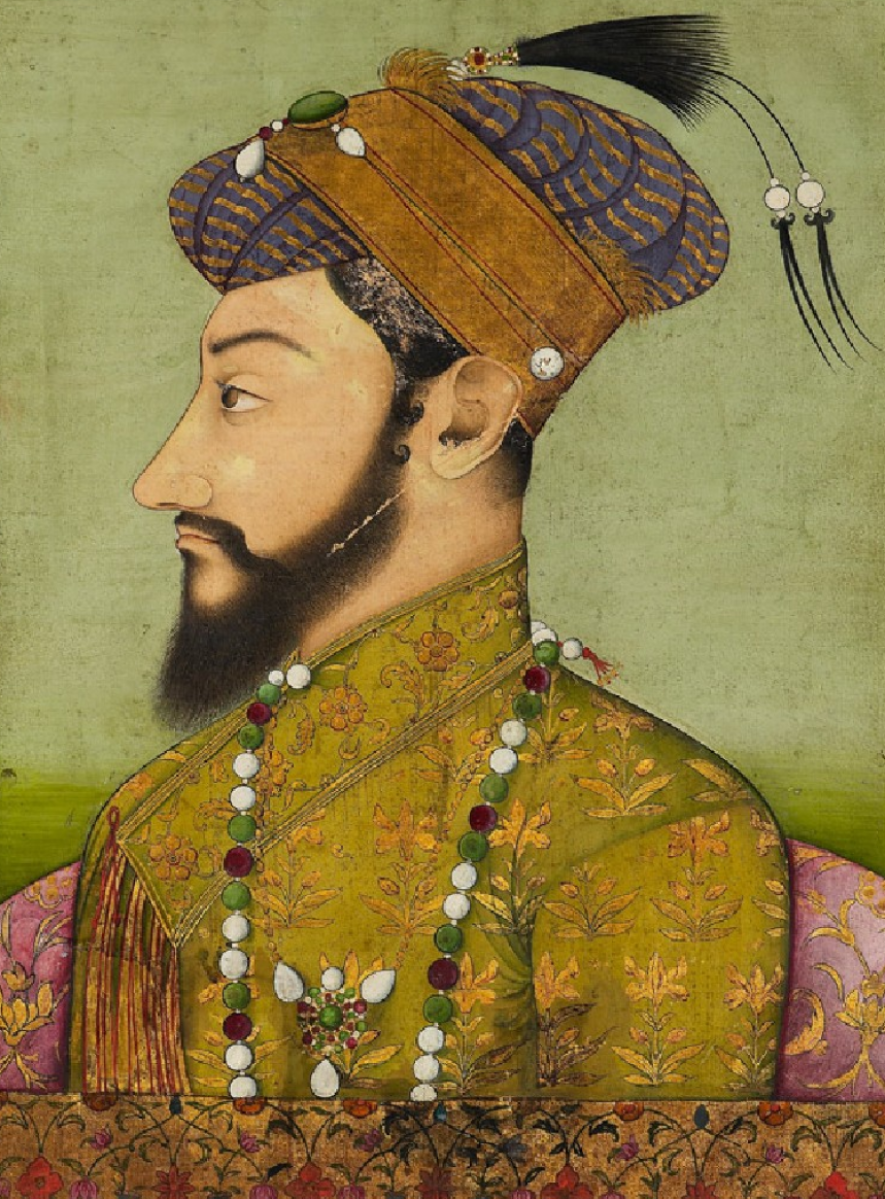
Emperor Aurangazeb

In 1688, the Emperor sent the 17-year-old Prince Bidar Bakht to assume supreme command in the Jat War. Bishan Singh Kachhawa, the new Raja of Amber (Jaipur), was appointed as commandant of Muttra with a special charge to root out the Jats. Bidar Bakht infused vigour into the Mughal operations. Bidar Bakht managed to conquer many forts including Tarkand, Navalkhand, Khelna, as well as Sinsani. The Prince laid siege to Fort Sinsani where his troops underwent hardships from the scarcity of provisions and water. They fired a mine, stormed the breach and captured the fort after three hours of obstinate fighting, losing 900 men to 1,500 Jat casualties. The Jat leaders Churaman and Fateh Singh were able to escape. Although Imperial forces were able to win 52 Jat Forts including the strongholds like Khair, Jawar, Sonkh, Sogar, etc. and kill thousands of them they found themselves "at sea with the Jats". The imperial army was called in 1696 from Agra Province. The Jat War remained proved to be a failure.

Bidar Bakht received a royal order, that he should reduce Sorseeny, and return again to the presence. He invested the place for three or four months, and Zorawar Singh, finding his treasure exhausted, delivered himself up. The prince carried him with him to the Deccan, where Aurangzeb caused him to be blown from the mouth of a cannon.

=== Defeat of Rajaram ===
In 1699 the Emperor sent urgent orders to Bidar Bakht to pursue and defeat the hostile force of Chhatrapati Rajaram at Surat, in the imperial territory. Bidar Bakht was 20 mi (32 km) west of Miraj, on his way to Panhala; he immediately turned aside and leaving his family and baggage in Miraj, rapidly advanced on the enemy. Bidar Bakht came upon the Marathas 20 mi (32 km) beyond the fort of Parenda. Rajaram stopped in safety 8 mi (13 km) further east, while he sent back his generals under Dhanaji Jadhav to check the Prince's advance. After a bloody fight the Marathas were broken and driven towards Ahmednagar on 13 or 14 November. Two days later, the Prince was joined by Chin Qalich Khan at Barsi, 20 mi (32 km) east of Parenda, and resuming the pursuit of Ausa on 22 or 23 November.

== Viceroyalty ==
=== Malwa: 1704–1706 ===
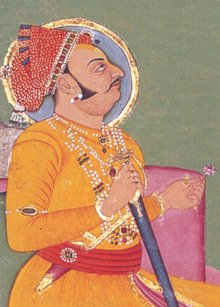
Ajit Singh

Bidar was appointed Viceroy of Malwa on 3 August 1704 by Aurangzeb. The Prince had proved himself a brave and skilful general. He was already the viceroy of Aurangabad and kept that position with his new appointment. He had to shift from Malwa to Khandesh or vice versa as the situation demanded, regarding the tribute which reached Agra from the northern provinces and had to put down the local uprisings of the Bhils and Kolis. These risings were caused by the Maratha invasion of the previous year. The Bhils also caused disturbances on the north-western frontier, building the fort Gagron. After the danger of another invasion by Nima had disappeared, the Prince went to Malwa to escort the tribute. There he fell ill during December 1703 and January 1705. He appointed Jai Singh II of Amber, his trusted assistant, to escort the tribute and to act as his deputy in Malwa. The Emperor objected to this appointment, ordering the Prince to recall Jai Singh. He appointed Khan Alam instead and ordered that no Rajput was to be appointed as a provincial governor or garrison commander. Bidar Bakht was ordered to go to Sansani, a fort near Bharatpur, which had recently been taken by the Jats and to recapture it. The Prince intend to comply but due to his illness and other engagements in Malwa, did not. During the 1705 rainy season, the Prince stayed in Malwa. During the closing months of 1705, his responsibilities were lightened. The provinces of Aurangabad and Khandesh were taken from his charge and entrusted to his father, Prince Azam, who was now on his way back from Gujarat.

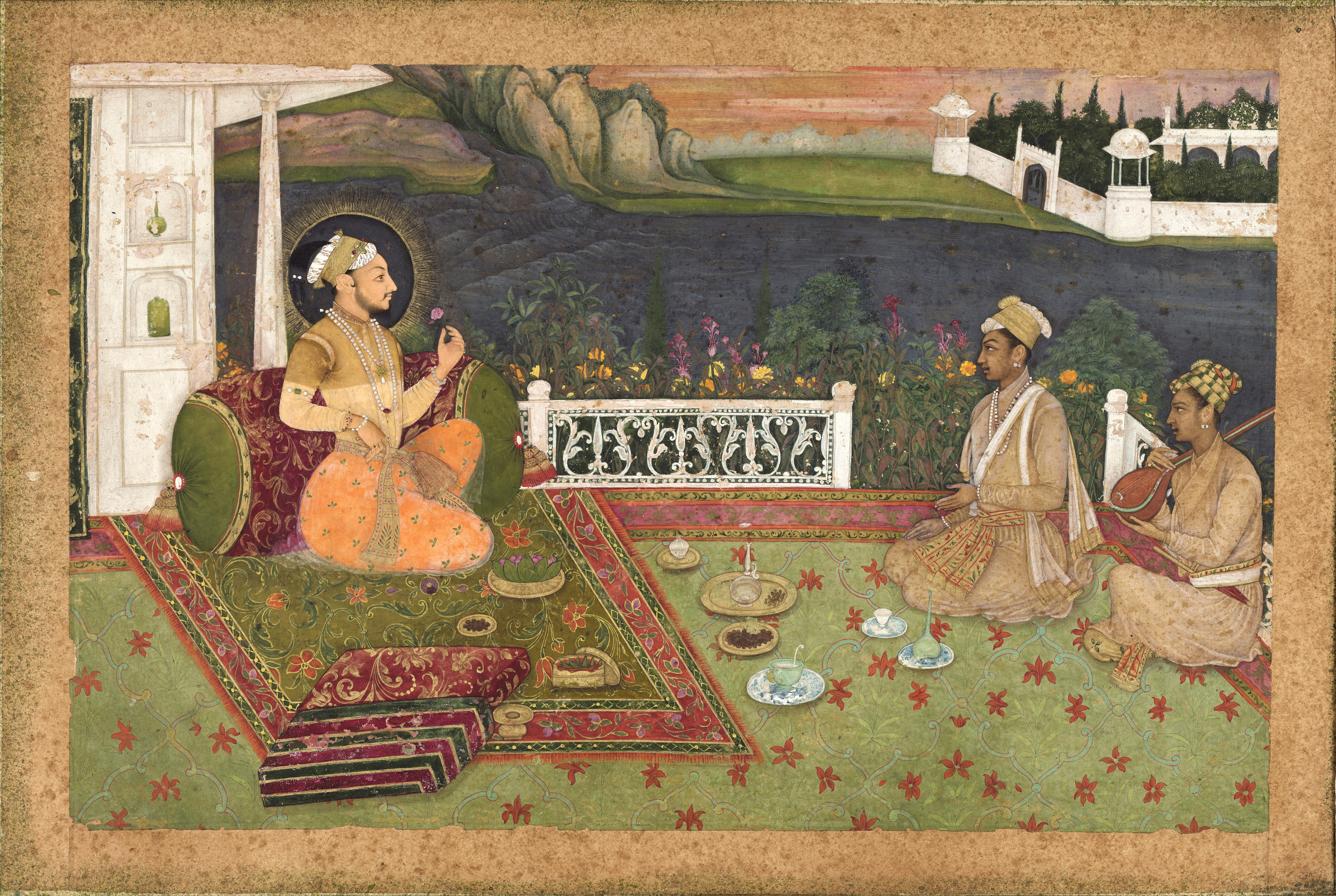
Prince Bedar Bakht and the Governor of Western Deccan enjoying music

Bidar Bakht continued on active service against the Marathas. He travelled to Malwa in November 1705 to investigate complaints against some of the assistants of Jai Singh. Bidar then went to Dhar to meet his father, angering the Emperor for not having returned to Burhanpur to hunt for the Marathas. The Prince had to move down to Nolai (Badnagar) to meet the Maratha forces sent by Parsu Maratha, to help Gopal Singh Chandrawat once again in his revolt. The province of Gujarat was invaded by the Marathas and the Emperor summarily ordered Bidar Bakht to start for Gujarat immediately. The Prince left Malwa in April 1706.

=== Gujarat: 1706–1707 ===
On arrival in Gujarat Bidar was put in charge of the province, replacing his father, pending the arrival of the new governor, Ibrahim Khan from Kashmir, who died on the way. Malwa and Khandesh were placed under Khan-i-Alam and Najabat Khan respectively. In 1706 a Maratha incursion into Gujarat was followed by a crushing defeat of the Mughal army at Ratanpur, which encouraged all of the enemies of the empire. Ajit Singh raised an army in rebellion for the third time. Durgadas again fled the Mughal camp and began to act in concert with him, causing uprisings in Therad and other places. Bidar sent a force against Durgadas who fled to the broken Koli country, south of Surat.

== Death of Aurangzeb : 1707 ==
On the 3rd of March 1707 emperor Aurangzeb Alamgir died at his military camp in Ahmadnagar. Prince Bidar Bakht was informed about the death of the emperor by his father Azam Shah who was proclaimed as the new Mughal emperor. On hearing the news of his grandfather's demise Bidar Bakht was overwhelmed with grief. It was reported that the death of the late emperor dwelt long upon the mind of the prince who would frequently weep recollecting the late emperor whom he dearly loved.

== Death ==
Bidar Bakht was killed on 20 June 1707, during the Battle of Jajau, part of the succession struggle on the death of Emperor Aurangzeb. His father, who had become emperor on the death of Aurangzeb on 17 March, was also killed during the battle.

== Ancestry ==
Ancestors of Bidar Bakht

16. Jahangir, Mughal Emperor (= 9, 24)
8. Shah Jahan, Mughal Emperor (= 12)
17. Taj Bibi Bilqis Makani (= 25.)
4. Aurangzeb, Mughal Emperor
18. Abul-Hasan ibn Mirza Ghiyas Beg (= 26)
9. Arjumand Banu Begum (= 13)
19. Diwanji Begum (= 27)
2. Muhammad Azam Shah, Mughal Emperor
20. Mirza Rustam Safavi
10. Mirza Badi-uz-Zaman Safavi
5. Dilras Banu Begum
22. Mirza Muhammad Sharif
11. Nauras Banu Begum
1. Bidar Bakht
24. Jahangir, Mughal Emperor (= 16, 28)
12. Shah Jahan, Mughal Emperor (= 8)
25. Taj Bibi Bilqis Makani (= 17)
6. Dara Shikoh
26. Abul-Hasan ibn Mirza Ghiyas Beg (= 18)
13. Arjumand Banu Begum (= 9)
Diwanji Begum (= 19)
3. Jahanzeb Banu Begum
28. Jahangir, Mughal Emperor (= 16, 24)
14. Shahzada Parviz
29. Sahib-i-Jamal
7. Nadira Banu
30. Murad Mirza
15. Iffat Jahan Banu
