= Sipihr Shikoh =

Mughal prince (1644–1708)

Sipihr Shikoh سِپهر شِکوہ
- Shahzada of the Mughal Empire; Mirza
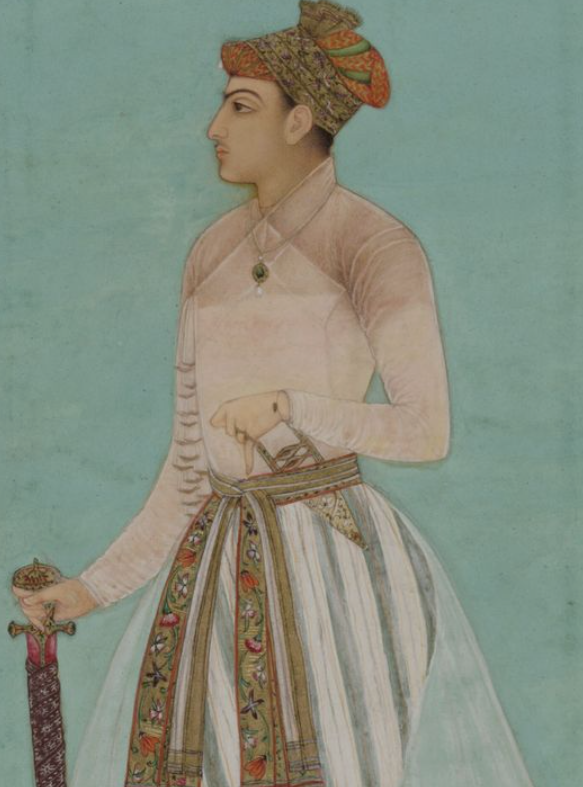
- Siphir Shikoh in his youth
- Born: 13 October 1644; Agra, India
- Died: 2 or 3 July 1708 (aged 63); Delhi, India
- Burial: Ahmedabad
- Spouse: Zubdat-un-Nissa Begum (m. 1673; d. 1707)
- Issue: Ali Tabar Mirza
Names
- Shahzada Muhammad Sipihr Shikoh Mirza
- House: Mughal dynasty
- Dynasty: Timurid dynasty
- Father: Dara Shikoh
- Mother: Nadira Banu Begum
- Religion: Sunni Islam

Mirza Sipihr Shikoh (Persian: میرزا سپهر شیکوه) (13 October 1644 – 2 or 3 July 1708) also known as Sipihr Shukoh, was a Mughal prince as the fourth son of Crown Prince Dara Shikoh and his consort Nadira Banu Begum.

== Life ==
Sipihr Shukoh was born on Thursday, 11 Shaban, 1054 (13 October 1644), to Dara Shukoh, and his consort, Nadira Banu Begum. He was the grandson of the fifth Mughal Emperor Shah Jahan, as well as the nephew and son-in-law of the sixth Mughal Emperor Aurangzeb. On his mother’s side, Sipihr was the grandson of Parviz Mirza, son of Emperor Jahangir and half brother of Shah Jahan. He was also descended from Sultan Murad Mirza (son of Akbar). Shah Jahan visited Dara’s house on the occasion of the birth, as he did for all of Dara's children, and gave two lakh rupees for the birthday celebration. Sipihr was his parents' sixth child, and one of three children who survived to adulthood. His two surviving siblings were his older brother, Sulaiman Shikoh, and younger sister, Jahanzeb Banu Begum.

Sipihr played a role under his father in the War of Succession between the sons of Shah Jahan. When Dara's army, under the imperial banner, fought the joint forces of Aurangzeb and Murad Bakhsh in the Battle of Samugarh on 29 May 1658, Sipihr, alongside Dara's general Rustam Khan Dakhini, led a cavalry charge against Aurangzeb's artillery as part of the left wing of the imperial army. Although initially successful, they were soon overpowered by Aurangzeb's forces. Dara lost the war, and he, along with Sipihr and a few followers escaped the battlefield to evade capture. They retreated back to Agra, gathered their possessions, and along with Nadira, Jahanzeb and some servants, left the fort during the odd hours of the morning as Auranzeb and Murad's armies advanced upon the city. The small force reached Delhi a few days later, however, the governor of the city denied them entry, despite orders from Shah Jahan. Sipihr and his family then fled to Lahore, where they were permitted into the fort. He was 13 years old at the time.

When Dara was camped at Lahore, it was suggested by his faithful commander, Daud Khan, that Sipihr be sent with him as a nominal commander-in-chief to oppose Aurangzeb’s army at Sultanpur, on the banks of the Beas. However, the prince’s arrival was delayed, forcing Daud Khan’s men to retreat, and thus the opportunity to take a stand was lost. Sipihr was recalled to Dara’s side soon after, as relations with Daud Khan soured.

After Dara’s flight from Lahore, through Multan and Thatta to the Rann of Cutch, Sipihr was betrothed to the daughter of the Rao of Cutch with the promise of an alliance. This marriage never came to fruition as the prince and his family had to resume their flight soon after. He and his family then travelled to Ahmedabad, where Dara put together a new army, deciding to fight Aurangzeb once more near Ajmer.

Sipihr also acted as Dara's ambassador in name, and visited Jodhpur in a vain attempt to persuade Maharaja Jaswant Singh of Marwar to join the cause against Aurangzeb, just prior to the Battle of Deorai on 12–14 April 1659. It was thought by Dara and his advisors that the presence of a Mughal Prince would turn the negotiations in their favour and compel Jaswant Singh to come to their aid. Although he was treated with great respect and hosted by the Maharaja at Jodhpur for a few days, Jaswant Singh eventually refused to come to Dara’s aid. During the ensuing battle at the pass of Deorai, Sipihr controlled the fourth section of Dara’s army, at the south-eastern corner, adjoining the hill of Gokla. The battle was eventually lost, and Dara and Sipihr were forced to flee to Ajmer by way of Merta, from where they proceeded once more to Ahmedabad. The new governor of Ahmedabad, following the death of Shah Nawaz Khan, refused to open the gates to the defeated party, and they had no choice but to continue their march eastwards, rapidly pursued by Aurangzeb's forces.

On 9 June 1659, Sipihr, along with Dara Shukoh and Jahanzeb Banu Begum, was captured and imprisoned by Malik Jiwan, an Afghan chieftain, at Dadar in Balochistan. They were then handed over to Aurangzeb's forces, and brought to Delhi. To humiliate them further, Sipihr and Dara were then seated alongside each other on a dirty old female elephant and paraded through the streets of Delhi in chains, dressed in coarse, ragged clothes. A slave with a naked sword sat behind them, ready to cut them down at any sign of a struggle. Sipihr was then imprisoned with his father while Aurangzeb determined Dara's fate. On the night of 30 August 1659 (9 September, according to the Gregorian Calendar), some of Aurangzeb's henchmen, led by Nazar Beg, barged into the prison and forcibly separated Sipihr from Dara. Sipihr was held down by the men, while Dara, after a small skirmish, was killed. After his father's death, Sipihr was sent to Gwalior Fort, where he would be imprisoned for the next thirteen years.

At Gwalior Fort, Sipihr was joined in his imprisonment by his uncle Murad Bakhsh, who he had previously fought at the Battle of Samugarh, and Murad's son Izzad Bakhsh. Two years later, in 1661, Sulaiman Shikoh, Sipihr's older brother, and Muhammad Sultan, Aurangzeb's eldest son, were also brought to Gwalior. This was the first time that Sipihr had seen his brother in over three years, as Sulaiman's army had been unable to come to Dara's rescue during the war. Unlike Sulaiman and his uncle Murad, Sipihr, owing to his young age, was not administered the 'pousta', an opium-based poison designed to slowly deteriorate the health and mental capabilities of the drinker. Murad was executed in late 1661, and Sulaiman shortly after in 1662. Sipihr had at this point witnessed the deaths of his mother, father, uncle, and brother. He continued to remain imprisoned along with Izzad Bakhsh and Muhammad Sultan.

In 1672, Multafat Khan was sent to Gwalior to bring Sipihr and Muhammad Sultan to Delhi. Sipihr was temporarily assigned a palace in Salimgarh Fort. On 16 December 1672, Emperor Aurangzeb ordered Sipihr and Muhammad Sultan to be brought into his bedchamber, or 'khwabgah'. After a brief stint, Sipihr received a robe and an emerald sarpech (turban ornament).

On 30 January 1673, Sipihr was married to his first cousin, Zubdat-un-Nissa Begum, a daughter of Aurangzeb and Dilras Banu Begum. The marriage was conducted in the presence of the emperor. Sipihr was presented with a jewelled dagger, a jewelled sarpech, a pearl necklace and a pearl chaplet. Sipihr's aunt Gauhar Ara Begum, and Hamida Banu Begum arranged the ceremony. He was given a yearly allowance of 6000 rupees.

Sipihr and Zubdat-un-Nissa had a son named Ali Tabar, born on 13 July 1676. The emperor went to Sipihr Shukoh’s house to see the child. Ali Tabar died in December of the same year and the robe of mourning was given.

== Death ==
He died in 1708, and his body was buried in Agra fort by Emperor Bahadur Shah

== Ancestry ==
Ancestors of Sipihr Shikoh

16. Jalal-ud-din Muhammad Akbar, Mughal Emperor (= 24, 28)
8. Nur-ud-din Muhammad Jahangir, Mughal Emperor (= 12)
17. Mariam-uz-Zamani (= 25)
4. Shahab-ud-din Muhammad Shah Jahan I, Mughal Emperor
18. Udai Singh, Raja of Marwar
9. Jagat Gosain
19. Manrang Devi of Gwalior
2. Dara Shukoh
20. I'timad-ud-Daulah
10. Abu'l-Hasan Asaf Khan
21. Asmat Begam
5. Mumtaz Mahal
22. Ghias ud-din ‘Ali Asaf Khan
11. Diwanji Begum
1. Sipihr Shikoh
24. Jalal-ud-din Muhammad Akbar, Mughal Emperor (= 16, 28)
12. Nur-ud-din Muhammad Jahangir, Mughal Emperor (= 8)
25. Mariam-uz-Zamani (= 17)
6. Parviz Mirza
26. Khwaja Hasan of Herat
13. Sahib-i-Jamal
3. Nadira Banu Begum
28. Jalal-ud-din Muhammad Akbar, Mughal Emperor (= 16, 24)
14. Murad Mirza
7. Jahan Banu Begum

== Positions ==
- Governor of Odisha (1680–1696)
- Qiledar of Red Fort (1701–1708)
