= Mumtaz Shikoh =

Mumtaz Shikoh مُمتاز شِکوہ
- Shahzada of the Mughal Empire
- Reign: India
- Born: 16 August 1643; Agra, India
- Died: 6 December 1647 (aged 4); Sirhind, India
- Burial: Lahore
- House: Timurid
- Father: Dara Shikoh
- Mother: Nadira Banu Begum
- Religion: Sunni Islam

Shahzada Mumtaz Shikoh (Urdu: مُمتاز شِکوہ) (born 16 August 1643) also known as Mumtaz Shukoh, was the son of Mughal prince Dara Shikoh and Nadira Banu Begum, his half-cousin. The Sufi saint Hazrat Mian Mir gave Rs 1,000,000 to celebrate his birth. Mumtaz Shikoh was Dara's third child.

== Ancestry ==
Ancestors of Mumtaz Shikoh

16. Jalal-ud-din Muhammad Akbar, Mughal Emperor (= 24, 28)
8. Nur-ud-din Muhammad Jahangir, Mughal Emperor (= 12)
17. Mariam-uz-Zamani (= 25)
4. Shahab-ud-din Muhammad Shah Jahan I, Mughal Emperor
18. Udai Singh, Raja of Marwar
9. Jagat Gosain
19. Manrang Devi of Gwalior
2. Dara Shukoh
20. I'timad-ud-Daulah
10. Abu'l-Hasan Asaf Khan
21. Asmat Begam
5. Mumtaz Mahal
22. Ghias ud-din ‘Ali Asaf Khan
11. Diwanji Begum
1. Mumtaz Shikoh
24. Jalal-ud-din Muhammad Akbar, Mughal Emperor (= 16, 28)
12. Nur-ud-din Muhammad Jahangir, Mughal Emperor (= 8)
25. Mariam-uz-Zamani (= 17)
6. Parviz Mirza
26. Khwaja Hasan of Herat
13. Sahib-i-Jamal
3. Nadira Banu Begum
28. Jalal-ud-din Muhammad Akbar, Mughal Emperor (= 16, 24)
14. Murad Mirza
7. Jahan Banu Begum
