= Jahanzeb Banu Begum =

- Shahzadi of the Mughal Empire
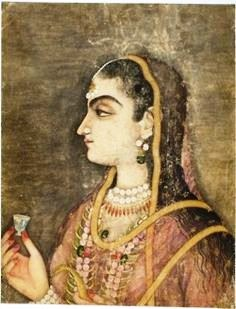
- Died: March 1705; Gujarat, India
- Burial: Khuldabad, India
- Spouses: Azam Shah (m. 1669)
- Issue: Sultan Bidar Bakht; Jawan Bakht Bahadur; Sikandar Shan Bahadur; Najib-un-Nisa Begum
Names
- Jahanzeb Banu
- House: Timurid (by birth)
- Father: Dara Shikoh
- Mother: Nadira Banu Begum
- Religion: Sunni Islam

Jahanzeb Banu Begum (died 1705), popularly known as Jani Begum, was a Mughal princess and the chief consort of Muhammad Azam Shah, the heir-apparent to Emperor Aurangzeb, who briefly became Mughal emperor in 1707.

The Italian writer and traveller, Niccolao Manucci, who worked under her father, described her as being beautiful and courageous.

== Family and early life ==
Jahanzeb was the daughter of Crown Prince Dara Shikoh, the eldest son and heir-apparent of Emperor Shah Jahan. Her mother, Nadira Banu Begum, was a Mughal princess and was the daughter of Prince Muhammad Parviz, the second son of Emperor Jahangir and Shah Jahan's older half-brother. Dara Shikoh was favoured by Shah Jahan as well as his older sister, Princess Jahanara Begum, as Shah Jahan's successor. Jahanara had always been an ardent partisan of her younger brother and greatly supported him.

Nadira Begum died in 1659 of dysentery and a few days after her death, Dara Shikoh was executed by the unanimous royal court's verdict after losing in battle to his younger brother Aurangzeb. Dara did not enjoy a good reputation except within the palace for his profound heresies against Islam and his love with the naked sufi, an ex-Jew Sarmad Kashani who used to roam the streets of Delhi completely naked. On the other hand Aurangzeb enjoyed an extremely favorable reputation amongst courtiers, clergies and the generals of Mughal army. After the death of Dara Shikoh, who was the heir-apparent to Shah Jahan, Aurangzeb became the sixth Mughal emperor. Jahanzeb subsequently became an orphan after the consecutive deaths of her parents. Her arrival before the throne of her father's murderer was vividly described by foreign chroniclers, as was her despair when she was handed over to her newly empowered aunt, Princess Roshanara Begum, to take care of her, Roshanara immediately started mistreating Jahanzeb.

She was therefore, forwarded to the Agra Fort by Aurangzeb where her grandfather, Shah Jahan, was being imprisoned. There, Jahanzeb was brought up by her eldest aunt, Jahanara Begum, as though she was her own daughter. Under her tutelage, Jahanzeb grew up to be a remarkably beautiful and cultured princess. When Jahanara died in 1681, she bequeathed her finest gems to Jahanzeb, her favourite niece.

== Marriage ==
On 3 January 1669, Jahanzeb married her first cousin, Prince Muhammad Azam, the eldest son of her uncle Aurangzeb and his chief wife, Dilras Banu Begum. The marriage ceremony was arranged by Jahanara Begum, amidst the most lavish and grand celebrations and took place in her palace. Their marriage proved to be extremely happy. Jani was Azam's trusted companion and confidante as well as his favourite wife being greatly loved by him. She was also Aurangzeb's best-loved daughter-in-law.

After her marriage, Jahanzeb played multiple roles in her husband's household. Two of them in particular stand out. The first can be broadly defined as military in nature, the second, less dramatic, but just as critical. The princess maintained harmonious household relations by cultivating a strong spirit of camaraderie and shared struggle among key members of the princely household. Her skill at this came to the fore in the winter of 1702, when a spat between Azam and his chief huntsman and koka Mir Hedayatullah occurred as the men were on a hunt. Azam was furious and he immediately threw his koka out of his household. It fell to Jahanzeb to persuade her husband to forgive Mir Hedayatullah, which she was able to do. After a few days, Mir Hedayatullah joined Azam's household in his old position.

The princess was also responsible for managing relations between Azam and their son, Prince Bidar Bakht. Unfortunately imperial favour poisoned relations between Bidar Bakht and his father. When Bidar was appointed viceroy of Malwa (contiguous to Gujarat where Azam was serving) in the early 1700s, Jahanzeb petitioned her uncle, Aurangzeb, to permit Bidar to come and visit her since she had not seen him in a long time. The young prince was granted seven days to visit his mother.

=== Military pursuits ===
Jahanzeb's first role in her husband's household can be broadly defined as a military one. In 1679, the princess led her husband's military contingents for more than three weeks when the prince was forced to move ahead on an urgent summons from his father, Aurangzeb. Three years later, in 1682, Jahanzeb mounted her own elephant to encourage a lagging Mughal counterattack on a Maratha Army. She is said to have personally handed out spears and paan and promised to commit suicide if the Mughal Army was overrun. She went into battle again in 1685-6 when Azam's forces had lost all hope during the invasion of Bijapur and is credited with whipping up morale.

== Death ==
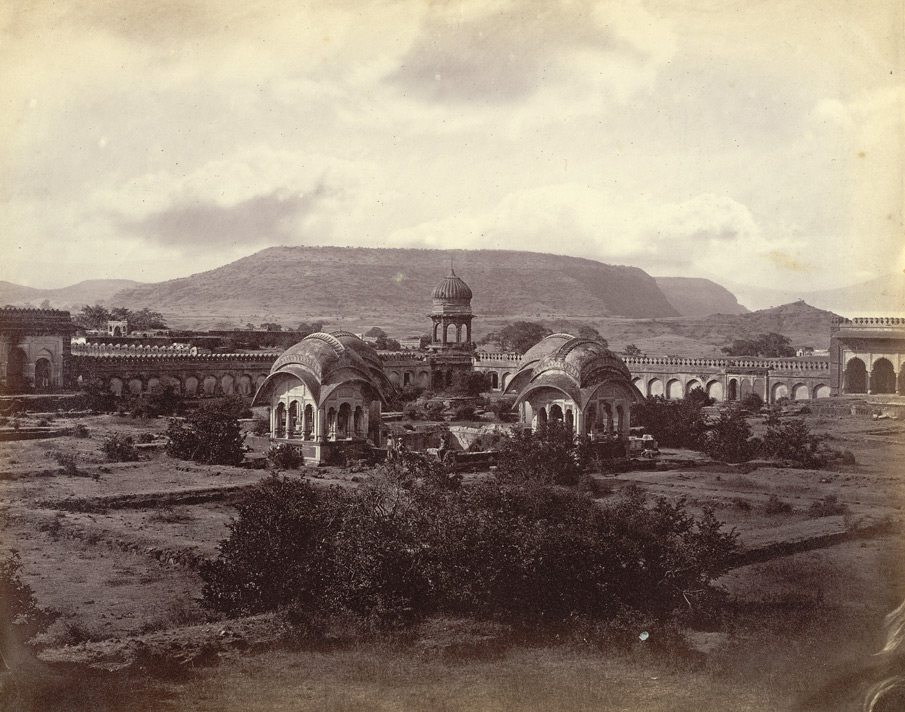
Jahanzeb's mausoleum, near Aurangabad in 1860s

Jahanzeb died in 1705 of an abscess in the right breast. The French doctor Mons. Martin had proposed that the princess should be examined by one of his female relatives then living in Delhi, (evidently an Indo-Portuguese Christian woman) who was skilled in surgery (haziqa) so that he might prescribe medicines according to her report. But the princess refused to be examined by a woman who drank wine, lest her body should be defiled by her touch. The disease lingered on for two years and she eventually died in great pain. Upon her death, Azam was filled with great sorrow and despair which darkened the remainder of his life.

== Ancestry ==
Ancestors of Jahanzeb Banu Begum

16. Jalal-ud-din Muhammad Akbar, Mughal Emperor (= 24, 28)
8. Nur-ud-din Muhammad Jahangir, Mughal Emperor (= 12)
17. Mariam-uz-Zamani (= 25)
4. Shahab-ud-din Muhammad Shah Jahan I, Mughal Emperor
18. Udai Singh, Raja of Marwar
9. Jagat Gosain
19. Manrang Devi of Gwalior
2. Dara Shukoh
20. I'timad-ud-Daulah
10. Abu'l-Hasan Asaf Khan
21. Asmat Begam
5. Mumtaz Mahal
22. Ghias ud-din ‘Ali Asaf Khan
11. Diwanji Begum
1. Jahanzeb Banu Begum
24. Jalal-ud-din Muhammad Akbar, Mughal Emperor (= 16, 28)
12. Nur-ud-din Muhammad Jahangir, Mughal Emperor (= 8)
25. Mariam-uz-Zamani (= 17)
6. Parviz Mirza
26. Khwaja Hasan of Herat
13. Sahib-i-Jamal
3. Nadira Banu Begum
28. Jalal-ud-din Muhammad Akbar, Mughal Emperor (= 16, 24)
14. Murad Mirza
7. Jahan Banu Begum
