= Luzzat-un-Nissa Begum =

Shahzadi of Mughal Empire

- Shahzadi of Mughal Empire
- Born: 23 September 1597; Kashmir, Mughal Empire
- Died: c. 1603 (aged 5); Allahabad, Mughal Empire
- Dynasty: Timurid dynasty
- Father: Jahangir
- Mother: Jagat Gosain
- Religion: Sunni Islam

Luzzat-un-Nissa Begum (Persian: لذت النسا, lit. 'Delight Among Women' 23 September 1597 – c. 1603) was a Mughal princess, the youngest daughter of Emperor Jahangir and his Rathore wife, Jagat Gosain. She was also the full sister of Emperor Shah Jahan.

== Life ==
Born on 23 September 1597, Luzzat was the youngest daughter of Prince Salim (later Jahangir), the eldest surviving son of Mughal Emperor Akbar. Her mother was the Rathore princess, Jagat Gosain (Bilqis Makani in official chronicles), the tenth daughter of Udai Singh Rathore, the Raja of Marwar. She was born at Kashmir on the return journey of the Royal entourage of her grandfather, Akbar, towards Lahore.

She had two older full-siblings, Begum Sultan, who died in early childhood at the age of one, and Prince Khurram, who succeeded their father to throne.

== Death ==
Luzzat-un-Nissa died at the age of 5, c. 1603, during the rebellion of her father.

== Ancestry ==
Ancestors of Luzzat-un-Nissa Begum

8. Nasir-ud-din Muhammad Humayun, Mughal Emperor
4. Jalal-ud-din Muhammad Akbar, Mughal Emperor
9. Hamida Banu Begum
2. Nur-ud-din Muhammad Jahangir, Mughal Emperor
10. Bharmal, Raja of Amber
5. Mariam-uz-Zamani
11. Rani Champavati Solanki
1. Luzzat-un-Nissa Begum
12. Maldeo, Rao of Marwar
6. Udai Singh, Raja of Marwar
13. Swarup Devi of Khairawa
3. Jagat Gosain
14. Askaran, Raja of Narwar (nephew of 10)
7. Manrang Devi
