= Nadira Banu Begum =

Mughal princess and wife of Dara Shikoh

- Shahzadi of the Mughal Empire
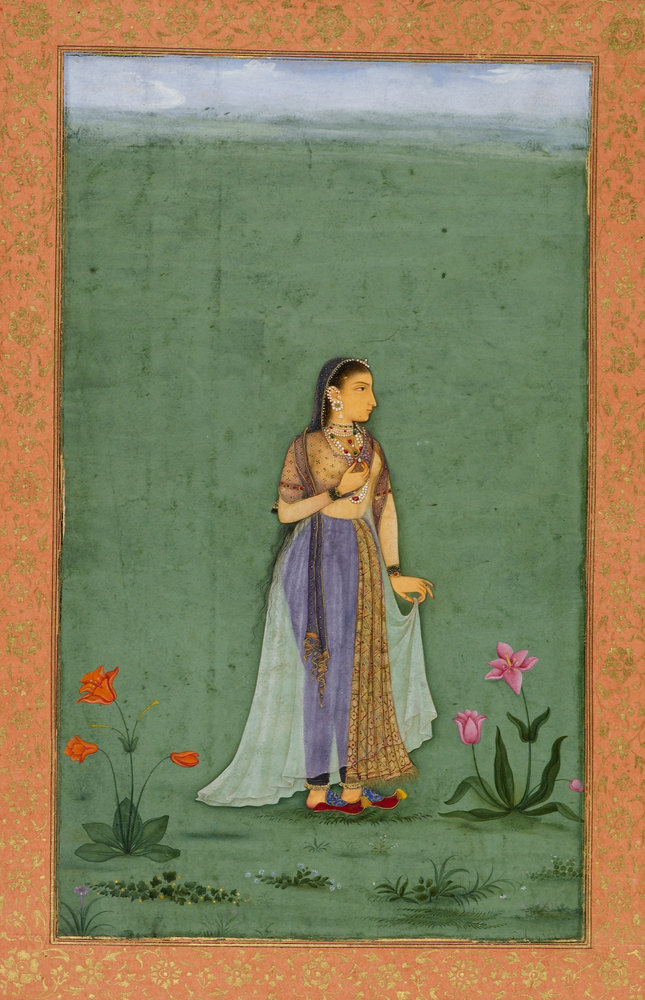
- This portrait is believed to be of Princess Nadira Banu Begum
- Born: 14 March 1618; Merta, Rajasthan, India
- Died: 6 June 1659 (aged 41); Bolan Pass, Balochistan
- Burial: Tomb of Nadira Begum, Lahore
- Spouses: Dara Shikoh (m. 1633)
- Issue: Sulaiman Shikoh; Mumtaz Shikoh; Sipihr Shikoh; Mihr Shikoh; Pak Nihad Banu Begum; Amal-un-Nissa Begum; Jahanzeb Banu Begum
- House: Mughal
- Father: Parviz Mirza
- Mother: Jahan Banu Begum
- Religion: Sunni Islam

Nadira Banu Begum (14 March 1618 – 6 June 1659) was a Mughal princess and the wife of Crown Prince Dara Shikoh, the eldest son and heir-apparent of the Mughal emperor Shah Jahan. After Aurangzeb's rise to power, Dara Shikoh's immediate family and supporters were in danger. Nadira died in 1659, a few months before her husband's execution, and was survived by two sons and a daughter.

== Family and lineage ==
Nadira Banu Begum was born a Mughal princess and the daughter of Sultan Parvez Mirza, the second son of Emperor Jahangir from his wife Sahib-i-Jamal Begum. Her mother, Jahan Banu Begum, was also a Mughal princess and the daughter of Sultan Murad Mirza, the second son of Emperor Akbar. Nadira was a half-cousin of her future husband, Dara Shikoh, as her father was the older half-brother of Shikoh's father, Shah Jahan.

== Marriage ==
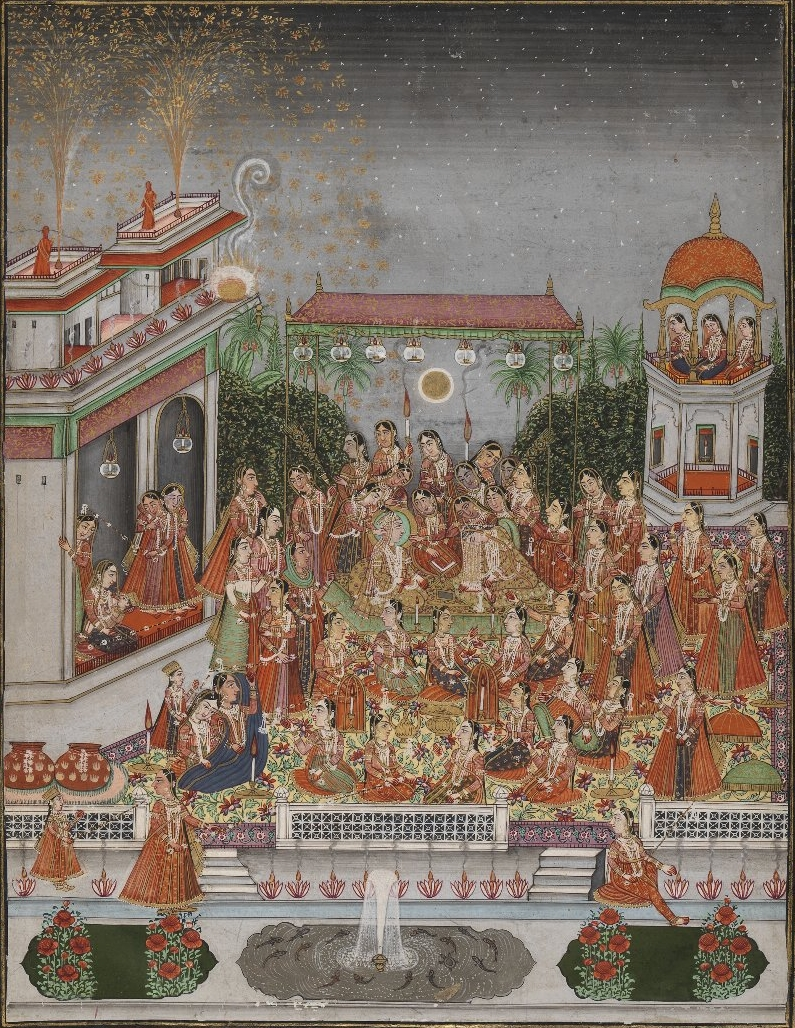
The wedding of Nadira Begum and Dara Shikoh

In 1631 arrangements for the planned wedding of Dara Shikoh and Nadira Begum were halted when Shikoh's mother, Empress Mumtaz Mahal, died while giving birth to her fourteenth child, Gauharara Begum. After the Empress' death, the Mughal Empire plunged into mourning. Shah Jahan was consumed by grief but, after the coaxing of many including his favorite daughter Jahanara Begum, Shah Jahan allowed wedding plans to resume under her oversight.

Begum and Shikoh married on 11 February 1633 at Agra amidst grand celebrations. The nikah ceremony was performed after midnight. Begum and Shikoh were both devoted to each other, and Shikoh never married again.

The two together had eight children: a daughter (29 January 1634 – 21 March 1634); Sulaiman Shikoh Mirza (6 March 1635 – 16 May 1662); Mihir Shikoh Mirza (4 July 1638 – 9 August 1638); Pak Nihad Banu Begum (born 26 August 1641); Mumtaz Shikoh Mirza (6 August 1643 – November–December 1648); Sipihr Shikoh Mirza (3 October 1644 – 3 July 1708); Jahanzeb Banu Begum (died March 1705), married Muhammad Azam Shah; and Amal-un-Nissa Begum.

Nadira Begum wielded great influence in her husband's harem and was granted the right to issue farmans and nishans. This privilege was allowed only to those who held the highest rank in the imperial harem. The only other woman who had this right was her cousin and sister-in-law, Jahanara Begum. The two women are believed to have got on well, a fact which probably sprung from Jahanara’s involvement in Begum's wedding and her closeness to her brother. Jahanara supported Shikoh, among all of her siblings, over Aurangzeb. According to the legend, when Aurangzeb fell sick sometime during his teen years, he called Jahanara to ask her if she would support him in his bid for the crown. She refused. Despite how unpopular this made her in his sight, she went on to become the head of the harem in Aurangzeb’s court.

Begum amassed a fine collection of paintings by Shikoh, a patron of the arts who was said to be a fine painter. He gifted these to her, calling her his "dearest and intimate friend." The collection was bound in together in what is now known as the "Dara Shikoh Album", currently held in a museum collection.

== Death ==
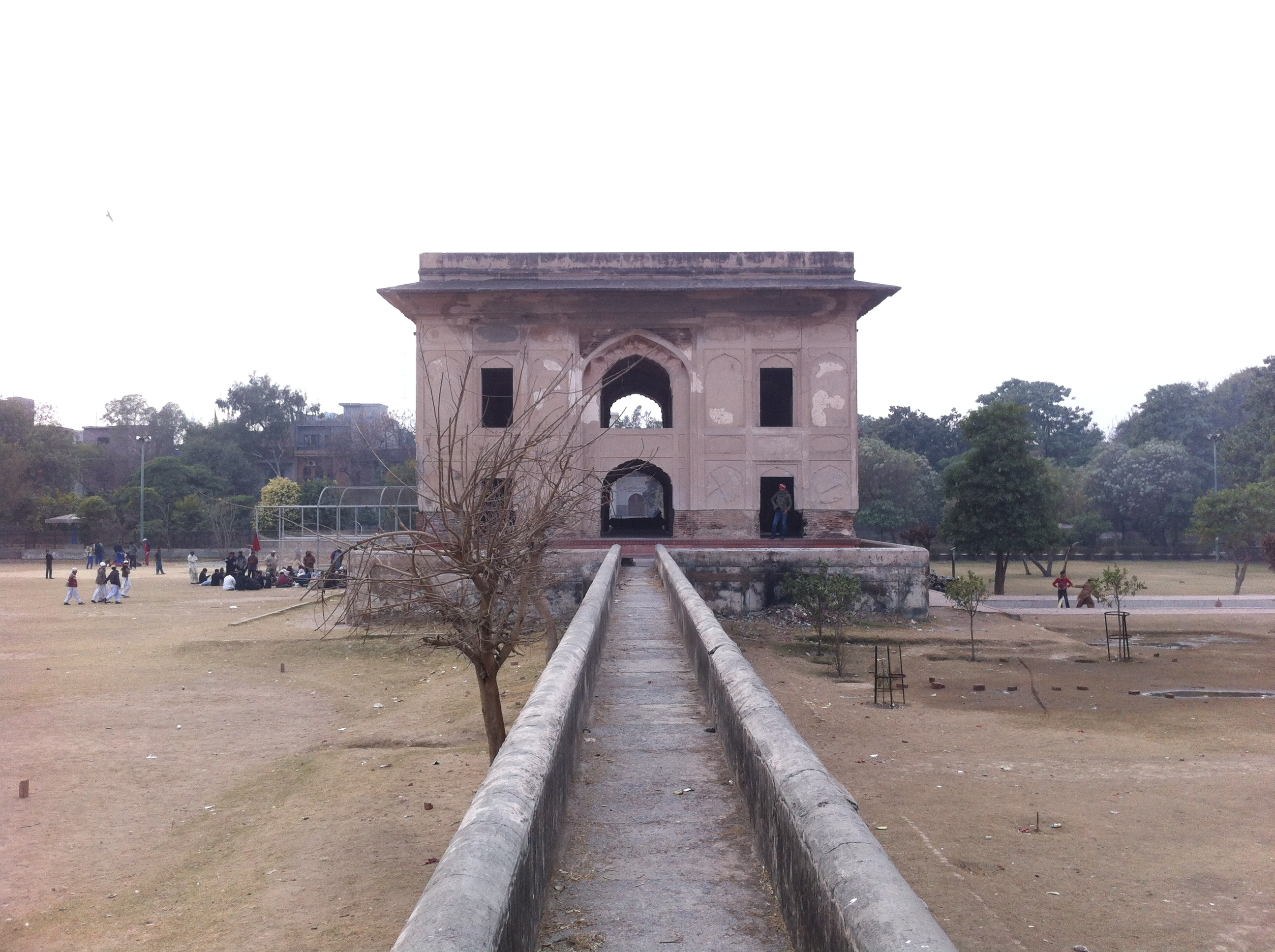
Outside view of Nadira Begum's tomb

Nadira Begum died on 6 June 1659 of dysentery while she was accompanying her husband and family in Bolan Pass, Balochistan. Her death left Shikoh in a frantic state of grief.

Begum's last wish was to be buried in India, so Shikoh sent his deceased wife's corpse for burial in Lahore under guard of his soldiers. The princess' tomb in Lahore was built next to Mian Mir's tomb, who had been the spiritual instructor of Dara Shikoh.

== Ancestry ==
Ancestors of Nadira Banu Begum

8. Jalal-ud-din Muhammad Akbar, Mughal Emperor (= 12)
4. Nur-ud-din Muhammad Jahangir, Mughal Emperor
9. Mariam-uz-Zamani
2. Parviz Mirza
10. Khwaja Hasan of Herat
5. Sahib-i-Jamal Begum
1. Nadira Banu Begum
12. Jalal-ud-din Muhammad Akbar, Mughal Emperor (= 8)
6. Murad Mirza
3. Jahan Banu Begum

== In popular culture ==
- Nadira Banu Begum is a principal character in Indu Sundaresan's historical novel Shadow Princess (2010).
- Nadira Banu Begum is a character in Ruchir Gupta's historical novel Mistress of the Throne (2014).
