= Parviz Mirza =

Mughal prince

- Mirza
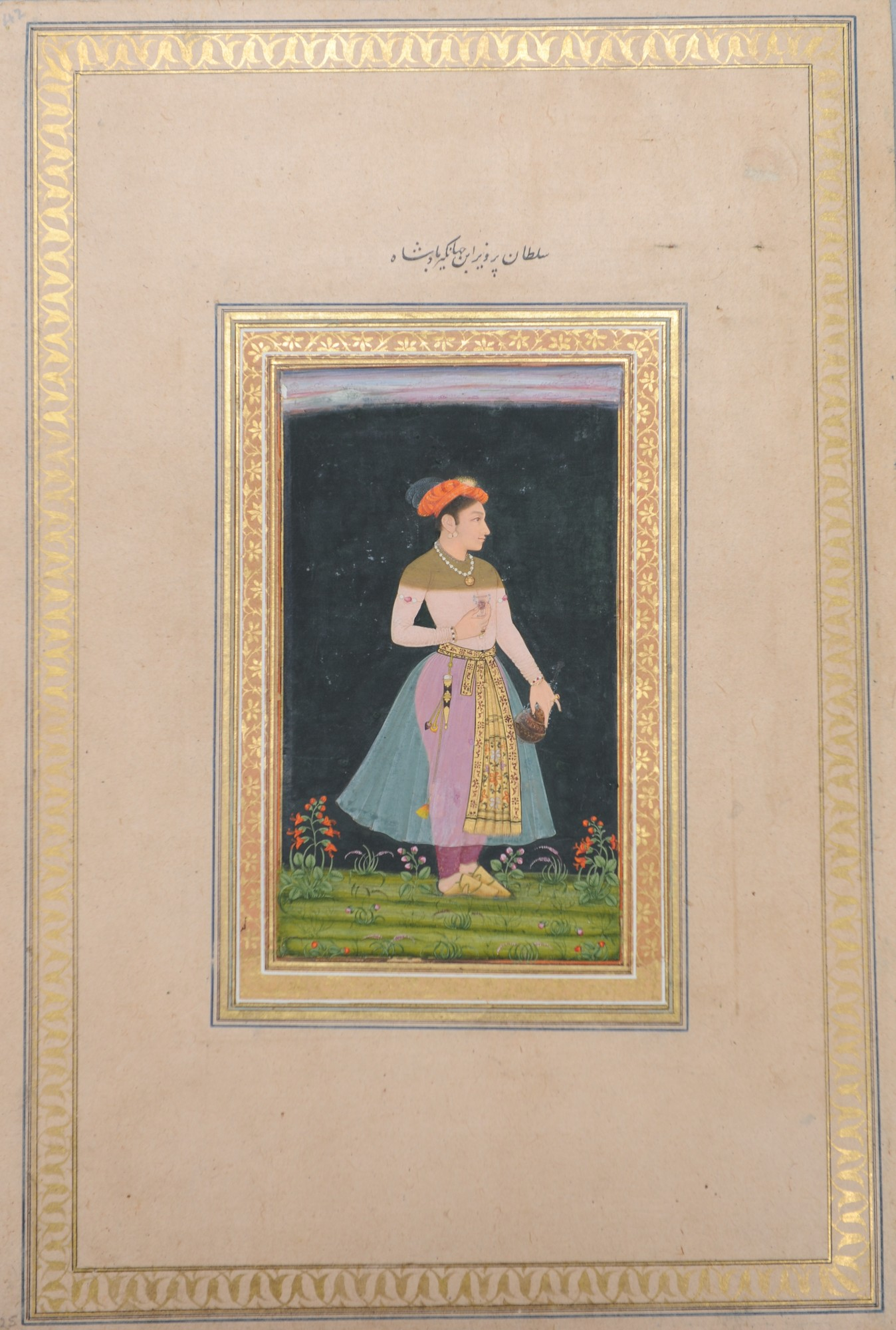
- Shahzada Parviz Mirza

Shahzada of the Mughal Empire
- Born: 31 October 1589; Kabul, Kabul Subah, Mughal Empire
- Died: 28 October 1626 (aged 36); Burhanpur, Khandesh Subah, Mughal Empire
- Burial: Bagh Sultan Parviz, Agra
- Spouse: Jahan Banu Begum (m. 1606); Daughter of Mirza Rustam (m. 1612); Manbhavati Bai (m. 1624)
- Issue: Mirza Durandish; Mirza Azam; Mirza Keshwar Kosha; Nadira Banu Begum
Names
- Parviz Mirza bin Nur-ud-Din Muhammad Salim Jahangir
- House: Mughal dynasty
- Dynasty: Timurid dynasty
- Father: Jahangir
- Mother: Sahib Jamal
- Religion: Sunni Islam

Parviz Mirza (31 October 1589 – 28 October 1626) was the second son of Mughal emperor Jahangir from his wife, Sahib Jamal. His daughter, Nadira Banu Begum, later became the wife of Dara Shikoh.

== Early life ==
Born on 31 October 1589, Parviz was the son of Jahangir and Zayn Khan Koka's cousin, Sahib Jamal. Zayn Khan Koka, was the son of one of Akbar's Amahs. As the Emperor's second son, Parviz was 2 years older than Khurram, and 2 years younger than Khusrau.

In peaceful times, before his brother's rebellion, he was active and enjoyed polo. Polo was a popular sport among the Mughal court, evidenced by a miniature showing the typical 4-player team consisting of Jahangir, Parviz, Khurram, and Asaf Khan.

He supported his father's war of succession. Following the failed revolt, and the death of Jahangir's grandmother Miriam Makani, Parviz accompanied his father back to Agra in 1604. This was in attempt to reconcile with Akbar, and his father was severely reprimanded for his treason.

Despite his status as elder son, he was widely regarded as ambitious but inept and intemperate, and therefore not a serious contender for the throne. He failed in his leadership of the Deccan War and had lost the faith of the court.

== War Campaigns ==
=== Mewar ===
Parviz led the first campaign against the Mewar, shortly after Jahangir's accession. He supported his father's ambitious foreign policy, and was given the figurative command of over 20,000 horses, but the campaign to Mewar was in reality under the control of Asaf Khan.

=== Deccan ===
In the year 1608, Jahangir sent Khan Khana with 12,000 reinforcements to the Deccan to combat the recent successes of Malik Ambar and the Marathis. Despite infighting among the Mughal military elite, he sent Parviz, closely supervised by Asaf Khan, to command and also govern Khandesh and Berar. The prince arrived in 1610, along with a contingent of 1,000 Ahadis and even more mansabdari soldiers. The prince was only 20 years old, and though headstrong and ambitious, he did not possess any natural talent for military or administrative strategy. His command of the Deccan campaign was in name only, and he instead held a royal court at Burhanpur. The European travelers through the region gave scathing reports of Parviz. Sir Thomas Roe says that "to describe it rightly, it was like a great stage and the prince sat there as the mock kings do there... the prince hath the name and State, but the Khan (the Khan Khana) governs all". Merchant Thomas Kerridge warned Roe about Parvez, saying, "(his) capacity being weak and he given to womanish pleasures, there is no hope either of honour or content from him... He supplieth the place in name only... the Khan Khana in matters of consequence there ordereth all, esteemed for nobility, honour and valour to be the chiefest of the land."

Ultimately Parvez and Khan Khana suffered repeated defeats at the hands of famine and guerilla tactics of Malik Ambar. In 1616 charge of the Deccan campaign was transferred to Khurram. The region was later placed back under Mughal rule.

== Khurram's Rebellion ==
In 1622 Parviz was appointed governor of Bihar. Thanks to Shah Jahan's successes suppressing rebellion in the Deccan, Gujarat, and Malwa, he had the support of respected military officers (including Khan Khana, the Rajput Kunwar Bhim, and the hero general Ray Rayan Raja Bikramajit). Incited by the report of apparent political control of Nur Jahan over the emperor, Shah Jahan marched from Mandu toward Fatehpur Sikri. Nur Jahan implored her allies to return to court, including Parviz and his forces from Bihar. Negotiations failed, raids and minor confrontations began in early March, 1623. On 29 March, Shah Jahan attempted to sabotage the Imperialist army by forging a secret alliance with Abdullah Khan, whose forces were meant to turn-coat mid battle. However, the plan backfired when Abdullah Khans forces were still received by Darab Khan as the enemy, and Raja Bikramajit's attempts to inform Darab led to Bikramajit being shot to the head in battle. Shah Jahan's army retreated in the confusion.

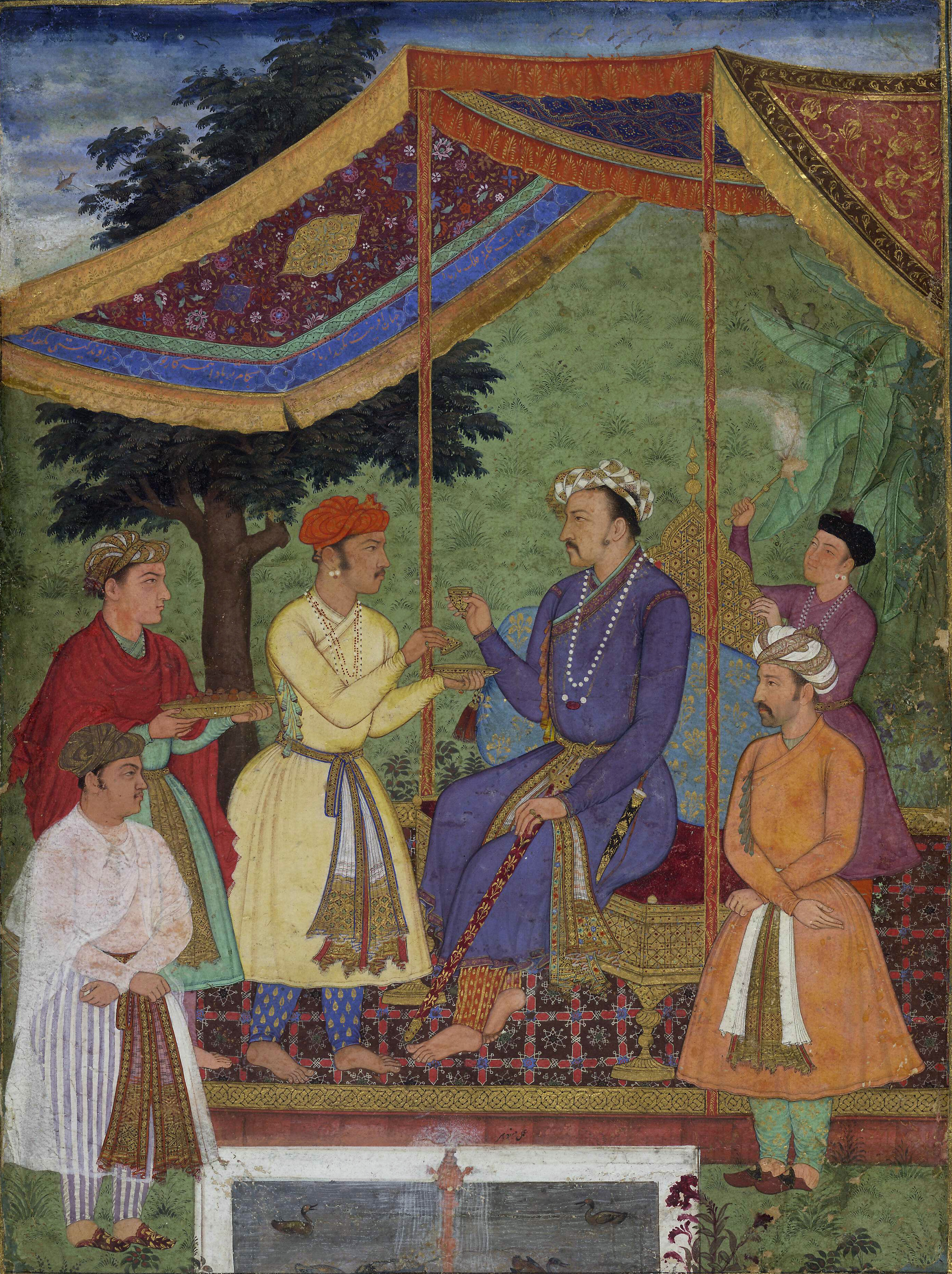
Emperor Jahangir receiving his two sons, Khusrau and Parviz, an album-painting in gouache on paper, c 1605-06.

Search and retribution against Shah Jahan was put off until Parviz arrived at court. The delay in his arrival may have been prudent and deliberate, in order to gauge the victor. When at last he did arrive, he was promoted above his brother. In May 1623, the formal search for Shah Jahan began under Parviz's command, but again only in name. Mahabat Khan served as the real commander. Shah Jahan met Parviz and Mahabat Khan's forces with a cavalry of 20,000 horses, 300 elephants, and artillery. Mahabat Khan countered with guerrilla tactics, as well as stealing the support of some of Shah Jahan's elite followers.

After several defeats, defections, and retreats, Shah Jahan attempted to negotiate with his brother and Mahabat Khan through Sarbuland Ray. Parviz demanded to negotiate directly with Khan Khana, as a representative of Shah Jahan, but Khan Khana quickly switched loyalties to the leadership of Mahabat Khan and the title of Parviz. Rather than continue negotiations, Shah Jahan fled the armies of Parviz and Mahabat Khan. The crown pressed Parviz to capture Shah Jahan or drive him to exile for good, but in 1623 Parvez returned to Burhanpur and left his brother to the Golconda territory.

In 1624, with Shah Jahan once again threatening the empire, this time through Bengal, Parviz and Mahabat Khan again left Burhanpur to assist the imperial cause. Shah Jahan again was forced to retreat into the Golconda.

Though he was given command of the armies to combat Khurram's rebellion, real control was always held by Mahabat Khan. Together they pursued Khurram for 3 years, ultimately defeating the rebellion in 1625. During the revolt, Khurram was demoted and in his stead Parviz was promoted to the rank of 40,000 zat 30,000 suwar. When Khurram surrendered, Nur Jahan advocated forgiveness for the dissenter, in part because she was worried the act of bringing him back under control had given too much power to Parviz and Mahabat Khan. She then set about separating the two to dilute their influence, and replaced Mahabat Khan with a new amir.

== Nur Jahan's antagonism ==
With Shah Jahan discredited for his rebellion, and his brother Khusrau Mirza dead, Parviz seemingly only had his younger brother Shahriyar as competition for the throne. Parviz was deemed an incompetent ruler and a drunk, and had been given unimportant regions to govern. However his association with the recent victories of his general and advisor, military hero Mahabat Khan, gained him favor with his father. Mahabat Khan did not approve of Nur Jahan's influence over Jahangir, and was therefore not a part of her powerful junta. Because of Mahabat Khan's popularity and status as the "most popular amir in the empire," Nur Jahan feared that he would be the real power behind the throne, if Parviz were to become the successor. With Khussrau dead, and Shah Jahan in exile, Jahangir's second son would be the logical heir. To preserve her own power she needed to separate them.

She herself supported Shahriyar as heir. Nur Jahan set out to weaken Parviz's claim to the throne by separating him from Mahabat Khan. She sent Khan Jahan Lodi to replace Mahabat khan as vakil to Parviz, and gave Mahabat Khan the governorship of Bengal to occupy him. Parviz refused to comply with this plan. He rejected the counsel of Khan Jahan Lodi, and Mahabat Khan refused to go to Bengal. Nur Jahan issued another command, this time with less cordiality, invoking the fate of the exiled Shah Jahan in a stern warning to Parviz against defying imperial orders, and demanding for Mahabat Khan to return to court. Parviz agreed to their terms. When Parviz at last consented, he remained at his fortress in Burhanpur. The issue of succession was all but settled when Parviz died at Burhanpur, of an "alcoholic coma."

== Personal character ==
The Mughal elite were active in the international trade industry, with many controlling ports and creating monopolies. When Parviz was governor of Patna, the merchants of the area hid their wealth and tried not to call attention to their activities. They may have feared the kind of extortion received in Bengal through the oppression of forced loans on the merchant class by Shayista Khan.

Thomas Roe visited Parviz at Burhanpur. He supposedly refused to pay the customary respects at court by performing the obedience of bowing to the ground, but this is highly unlikely as he was a diplomat and this was his first introduction to a Mughal prince. Parviz denied him his request to approach the prince, as well as his request for a chair, but instead allowed him to lean against a pillar. The compromise of leaning against a pillar was understood to be a precursor to a more intimate discussion later on, but Roe had gifted the prince with wine and Parviz was later too drunk to honor the meeting.

The prince was a devoted son, and paid great respect to filial piety. In 1620, when his father fell severely ill, Parviz was at his side. Parviz performed the circle Mughal court ritual in 1621, which call for circling the bed of a sick loved one three times with the intention of drawing the sickness upon oneself. The circumambulation was in face an effort to cure his father Jahangir's sickness, though Jahangir did not approve.

== Marriages ==
Parviz's first wife was Princess Jahan Banu Begum, the daughter of his uncle Prince Sultan Murad Mirza, second son of Emperor Akbar. Jahangir betrothed Parviz to Jahan Banu on 12 September 1606, and sent 130,000 rupees as a marriage present to her house. The marriage ceremony took place on 29 October 1606 at the palace of his grandmother, Mariam-uz-Zamani. The entertainment was arranged at Parviz's house, and all who were present were exalted with all kinds of honor and civilities. Nine thousand rupees were handed over to Sharif Amuli and other nobles, to be given in alms to the poor. She was the mother of Parviz's eldest son, Prince Durandish Mirza born on 2 February 1615, and died on 5 December 1619, and of Princess Nadira Banu Begum wife of Shah Jahan's son Prince Dara Shikoh.

His second wife was the daughter of Mirza Rustam, son of Soltan Hosayn Mirza and grandson of Bahram Mirza Safavi. In 1612, Jahangir called Rustam Mirza to his presence, and treated him with kindness, and gave his daughter in marriage to Parviz.

His third wife was Manbhavati Bai, the daughter of Raja Suraj Singh of Marwar by his wife Kishnavati Bai, an adoptive daughter of Akbar, and the sister of Raja Gaj Singh. The marriage took place in April 1624. On 10 April 1624, Jahangir received the news of the marriage from Aqidat Khan, who was the Bakhshi of Deccan. Jahangir expressed a hope that her advent into the family will prove auspicious. In intellect and understanding she was distinguished from the ladies of her time.

== Death ==
Like many throughout the history of the Mughal court, Parviz had a notorious liking for drink. He was ravaged by excessive drinking and an indulgent lifestyle by the age of 37. In 1626, Parviz was gravely ill. He suffered delirium, fell into a coma, required five head wounds to be cauterized. He briefly awoke from the coma only to lose consciousness again. He died at the age of 38. With another heir out of the way, the cause of death was immediately suspected to be poison from the hand of Shah Jahan. Later, after Shah Jahan was deposed by Aurangzeb, his son jeered at him "how do you still regard the memory of Khusrav and Parviz, whom you did to death before your accession and who had threatened no injury to you?". Prince Parviz was temporarily laid to rest in a tomb at Burhanpur and later transferred to Agra for final burial.

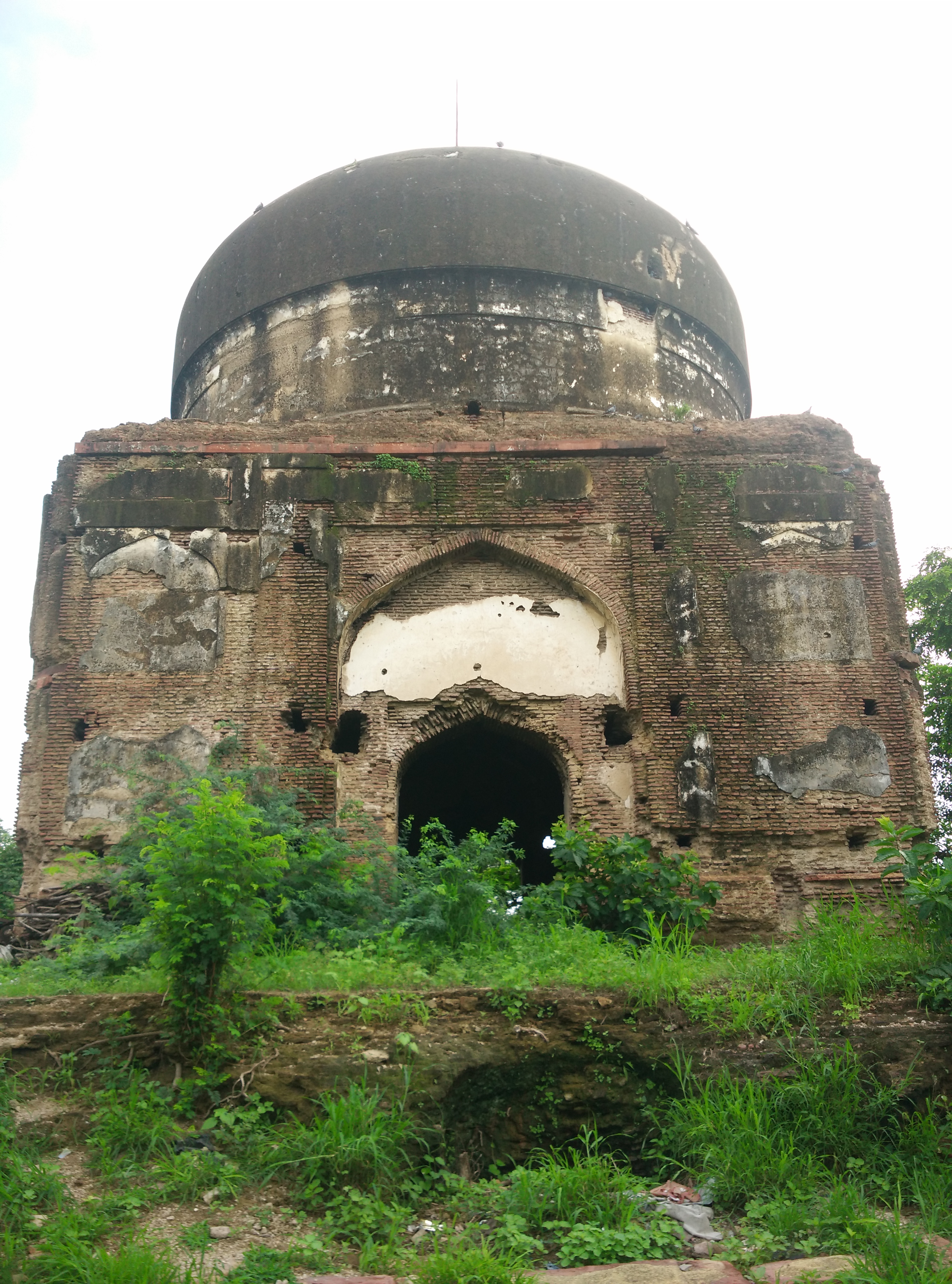
Decaying Tomb of Prince Parviz, Agra

Parviz's tomb is located on the banks of the Yamuna river, near the Itimad-ud-Daula and Chini Ka Ruza. The original design of the tomb was modeled after the mausoleum of Timur, and was situated in the center of the garden at Char Bagh. Not many people of Agra know of this tomb. It once boasted lime mortar plaster, octagonal minarets, and an inverted lotus at the dome. The tomb is not protected by the Archaeological Survey of India or any state level archaeological organization, and is subsequently falling into ruin.

== Bibliography ==
- Devi, Aditya. (2015)."Abandoned by conservators, Shah Jahan's elder brother's tomb on verge of collapsing". The Times of India, p. The Times of India, 1 September 2015. Accessed 20 July 2016.
- Eraly, Abraham. (1997). The Last Spring: The lives and times of the great Mughals. New Delhi: Viking, Penguin Books India. ISBN 9780670875184
- Eraly, Abraham. (2004). The Mughal Throne: The Saga of India's Great Emperors. London: Phoenix. ISBN 9780753817582
- Gascioigne, Bamber. (2002). A Brief History of the Great Moghuls: India's most flamboyant rulers. London: Constable and Robinson. ISBN 9781841195339
- Prasad, Beni. (1922). History of Jahangir. London: H Milford, Oxford University Press. OCLC 5530634
- Raychoudhry, S.C.. (1984). History of Mughals. vol. IV of Comprehensive history of India, from 1526 to 1707 A.D. Delhi: Surjeet Publications. OCLC 469499970
- Schimmel, Annemarie (2004). The Empire of the Great Mughals: History, art and culture (Revised ed.). London: Reaktion Books LTD. ISBN 1861891857
