= Jagat Gosain =

Empress Consort of Mughal Emperor Jahangir

- Empress consort of the Mughal Empire; Rajkumari of Marwar
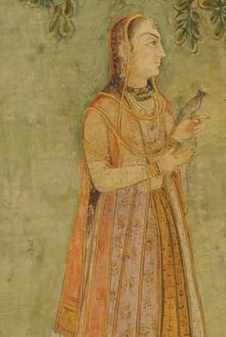
- Jagat Gosain holding a bulbul, c. 17th century
- Born: Manavati Bai; 13 May 1573; Jodhpur or Phalodi, Marwar, Mughal Empire (present-day Rajasthan, India)
- Died: 8 April 1619 (aged 45); Akbarabad, Agra Subah, Mughal Empire (present-day Agra, Uttar Pradesh, India)
- Burial: Dehra Bagh, Agra (present-day Jodhbai Ki Chattri at Arjun Nagar, Agra)
- Spouse: Jahangir (m. 1586)
- Issue: Begum Sultan Begum; Shah Jahan; Luzzat-un-Nissa Begum
Posthumous name
- Bilqis Makani (lit. 'Lady of the Pure Abode')
- Dynasty: Rathore (by birth); Timurid (by marriage)
- Father: Raja Udai Singh
- Mother: Manrang Devi
- Religion: Hinduism

Manavati Bai (13 May 1573 – 8 April 1619), also spelled as Manvati Bai, better known by her title Jagat Gosain (lit. 'Saint of the World'), was the second wife and the empress consort of the fourth Mughal emperor Jahangir and the mother of his successor, Shah Jahan.

She is also known as Mani Bai, Manmati, Jodh Bai (lit. 'Princess of Jodhpur'), Taj Bibi (lit. 'Lady of the Crown') and was also given the posthumous title of Bilqis Makani (lit. 'Lady of the Pure Abode'). She was also wrongly referred to as Balmati Begum by Manrique. She should not be confused with her mother-in-law, Mariam-uz-Zamani, who was erroneously called as "Jodha Bai" by European historians since any daughter belonging to the Jodhpur region could be called Jodha Bai or daughter of Jodhpur region.

By birth, she was a Rajput princess of Marwar (present-day Jodhpur) and was the daughter of Raja Udai Singh (popularly known as Mota Raja), the ruler of Marwar and the full-sister of Sawai Raja Sur Singh, another ruler of Marwar and Maharaja Kishan Singh, founder of Kishangarh.

== Family ==
Born on 13 May 1573 as Manavati Bai, she was known popularly as Jodh Bai (the Jodhpur Princess). She was born to the Rathore clan of Rajputs and was the daughter of Raja Udai Singh, the ruler of Marwar (present-day Jodhpur). Udai Singh was popularly known by the sobriquet Mota Raja (the fat king). Her mother was Rajavat Kachvahi Manrang Devi, the principal consort of her father and daughter of Raja Askaran of Narwar (d.1599), who was also briefly Raja of Amber before being ousted in favor of his uncle, Bharmal.

Her paternal grandfather was Maldeo Rathore, under whose rule Marwar turned into a strong Rajput Kingdom that resisted foreign rule and challenged the invaders for northern supremacy. Maldeo Rathore refused to ally with either the Sur Empire or the Mughal Empire after Humayun regained control of North India in 1555. This policy was continued by his son and successor, Chandrasen Rathore.

After the death of Maldeo Rathore in 1562, a fratricidal war for succession started and Chandrasen crowned himself in the capital, Jodhpur. But his reign was short-lived as Emperor Akbar's army occupied Merta in the same year and the capital Jodhpur in 1563.

After the death of Rao Chandrasen in January 1581, Marwar was brought under direct Mughal administration. In August 1583, Akbar restored the throne of Marwar to Udai Singh, who, unlike his predecessors, submitted to the Mughals and subsequently joined the Mughal service.

== Marriage to Jahangir ==
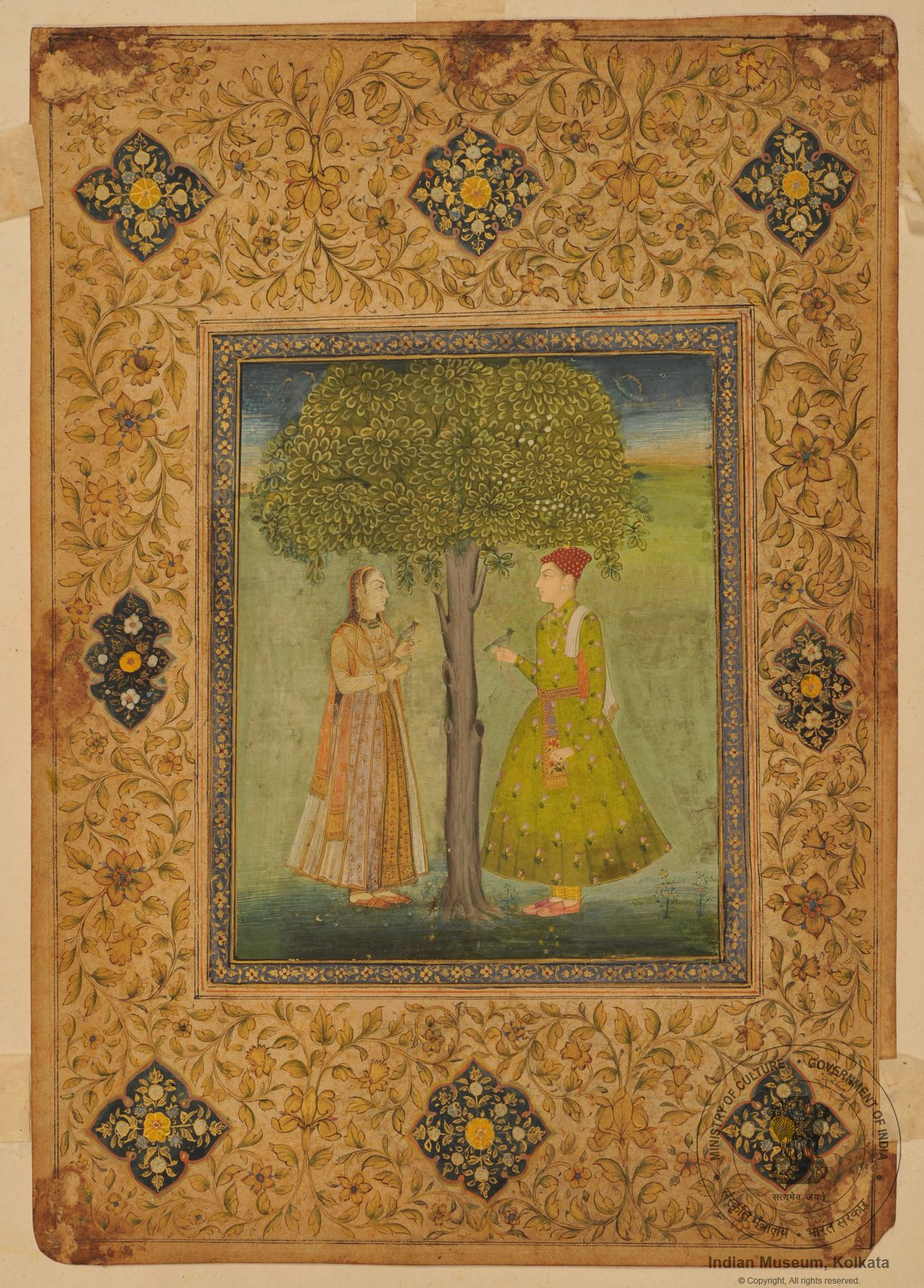
Young Jagat Gosain and Prince Salim, both holding Bulbuls c.17th century

According to Muni Lal, the young Jagat Gosain is said to have caught the eye of Prince Salim when he was attending a function with his mother and other senior women of the Mughal harem. He is said to have immediately proposed marriage. The Emperor was reluctant to give his consent and only agreed upon the intercession of Hamida Banu. She married the 16-year-old Prince Salim (later known as 'Jahangir' upon his accession) on 11 January 1586. The marriage settlement was fixed at seventy-five lakhs tankas. Akbar, himself, accompanied by the ladies of the harem, went to the Raja's house where the marriage was solemnized. The marriage ceremony was lavish one, with both Hindu fire ceremonies in the presence of a priest chanting Sanskrit verses, and Muslim proprieties in presence of Qadi and an array of military and civilian dignitaries.

According to Murārdān, her paternal cousin, Rana Kalyan Das Rathore took offence at this marriage and was angry at Mota Raja and had remarked –

Why has a daughter been married to the Turks? I shall kill the Prince and Mota Raja!

When the Mota Raja heard this remark, he informed Akbar who ordered him to kill Kalyan Das. Kalyan Das fled the Imperial Camp to Siwana. Udai Singh sent two of his sons, Bhopat and Jaisingh to Siwana. But the fort and opponent proved too strong for them and they were forced to retreat. In the face of this defeat, Mota Raja received permission from Akbar to leave the imperial camp. After his return to Marwar, he led a force against Siwana himself. Kalyan Das, realizing defeat was imminent, had his wives perform Jauhar and himself led his men to die fighting. After this victory, Siwana was handed over to Mota Raja.

She was granted the title "Jagat Gosain" on account of her ability and learning. This marriage served very well for the cause of the house of Marwar. Marwar's alliance with Mughal would have broken down due to religious strain estrangement had Jahangir and Shah Jahan not been bound by blood ties. After this marriage, Udai Singh and brothers and nephews of Jodh bai succeeded in gaining the confidence of their contemporary rules and were recipients of Royal favors.

Although the marriage was a political one, Jagat was known not only for her beauty, charm, and soft voice but for her wit, courage, and spontaneity of response, all of which greatly endeared her to her husband during the early years of their marriage. She is believed to have been a good singer and well-versed in music. After her marriage, she was placed under a group of expert musicians for proper training.

In 1590, she gave birth to her first child, a daughter, named Begum Sultan, who died at the age of one. On 5 January 1592, she gave birth to Salim's third son, who was named 'Khurram' ("joyous") by his grandfather, Emperor Akbar. The prince, who was to become the future emperor Shah Jahan.

Her son Khurram, considered to be auspicious according to his astrological signs, was raised at Akbar's insistence under his care in his palace rather than Salim's palace. He was placed under the care of Akbar's first wife Ruqaiya Begum who resided in Akbar's harem, and is stated to have raised Khurram affectionately.

After Akbar died in 1605, the young prince was allowed to return to his father's household, and thus returned to the supervision of his mother, whom he cared for and loved. He had become devoted to her and designated her Hazrat in his court chronicles. In the intervening years, Jagat had given birth to her third and last child in 1597, a daughter, Luzzat-un-Nissa, who died in early childhood, c. 1605.

According to Findly, Jagat Gosain seems to have lost her husband's favor quite early on in their marriage, whereas according to S. S. Gupta, she was the favorite wife of Jahangir till the arrival of her arch-rival in the imperial harem, Nur Jahaṇ, of whom Jagat was scornful. Jahangir had married her in 1611 and from the time of their marriage until his death, Nur Jahan was indisputably his favorite wife. Even before his marriage with Nur Jahan, Jahangir's chief consort and Padshah Begum was his wife Saliha Banu Begum, who held this position from the time of their marriage till her death in 1620, after which this honorable title was passed on to Nur Jahan.

The Jahangiri Mahal at Agra Fort used to be the residence of Jagat Gosain, as chosen by Jahangir. The West side of the quadrangle, surrounded by oblong niches with portraits of Hindu deity, was her temple.

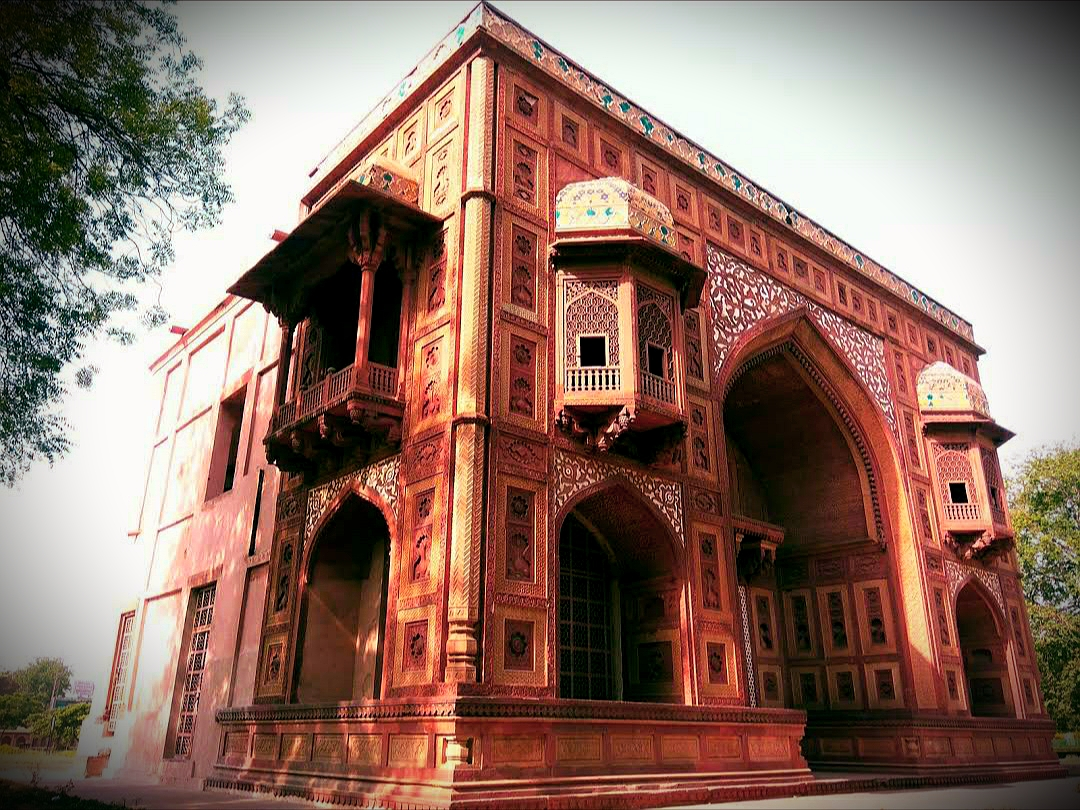
Kanch Mahal at Sikandar

The Kanch Mahal, sometimes called Jodh Bai's Mahal, located at Sikandra, is said to have been built by Jahangir for Jagat Gosain. Also the area called 'Taj Ganj' in Agra is said to be named in her honor.

She is also said to have founded a village named Sohagpura, which is wholly dedicated to the manufacturing of glass bangles.

== Death ==
In 1619, during her stay at Fatehpur Sikri, Jagat Gosain became ill and the treatment she received had no effect. Finally, she died on 8 April 1619 at Akbarabad (present-day Agra). Jahangir noted the death:

On Friday, the 30th, the mother(Jodh baī) of Shāh-Jahān attained the mercy of God.

— Jahangir, Emperor of India, Tūzuk-i-Jahangīrī, Volume II p. 84

Shah Jahan, as noted by Jahangir, was inconsolable and

The next day I myself went to the house of that precious son, and having condoled with him in every way, took him with me to the palace.

— Jahangir, Emperor of India, Tūzuk-i-Jahangīrī, Volume II p. 84

According to Muni Lal, Shah Jahan was so indulged in grief on the death of his mother that "For twenty-one days he attended no public entertainment and subsisted on simple vegetarian meals" and Arjumand Banu "personally supervised the distribution of food to the poor during the three - week mourning period and led the recitation of the Holy Quran every morning" and "gave her husband many a lesson on the substance of life and death, and begged him not to grieve".

After her death, Jahangir ordered that she be called Bilqis Makani ("the Lady of Pure Abode") in all official documents. Her death, along with the retirement of Mariam-uz-Zamani, led to the decline of Rajput influence on the Mughal court.

She was buried in Dehra Bagh near Noor Manzil (present-day Arjun Nagar, Agra) according to her wishes. Her tomb was a square building of 78 feet on all sides and consisted of a high dome, gateways, towers and a garden situated in the cantonment area. It had a large vaulted underground chamber, into which four inclined passages descended. A marble cenotaph is believed to have existed below. Her tomb stood on two platforms, one higher than the other. The first platform extended 38 feet from the tomb and the second about 44 feet from the first. On the east side, 670 feet away was a grand gate and on the west side, 657 feet away stood a mosque. Between the tomb and the gateway and the tomb and mosque were two raised platforms, one on each side of 42 feet square. All of this was blown up in 1832 with gunpowder, for the sake of its site and material, stone and brick, which the British needed.

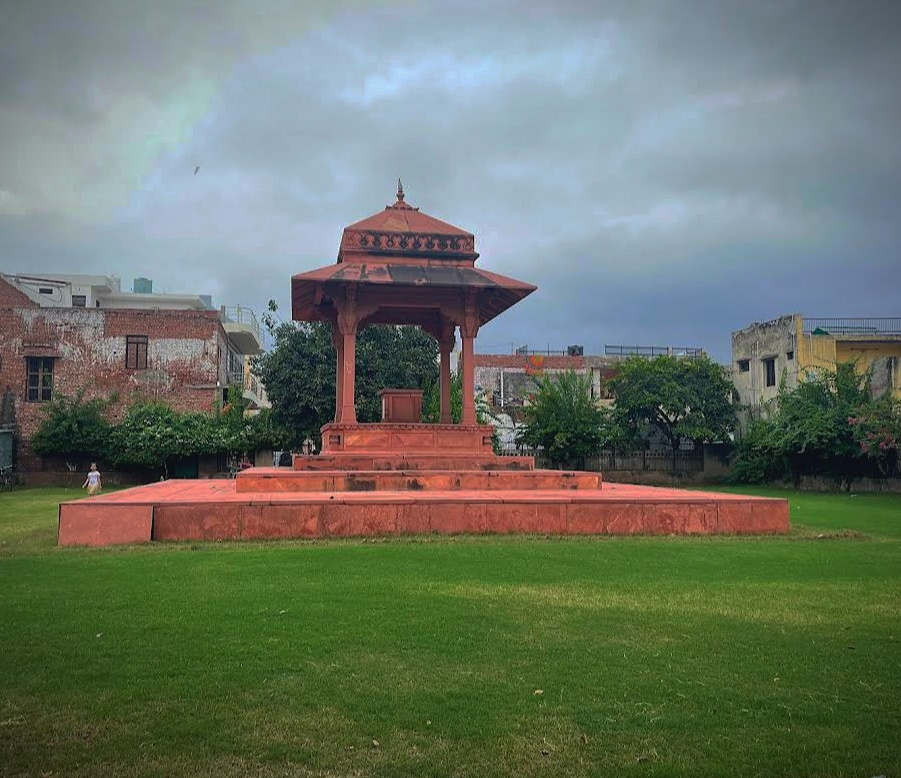
Chhatri of Empress Jodh Bai

In 1921, a chhatri was constructed marking the site of her tomb using a design made in the Archeological Superintendent Office. The Chhatri is built exactly on the site of the original crypt chamber. The construction of the Chhatri was funded by the Maharajadhiraja of Burdwan and cost about Rs 200(in 1921). The Chhatri is known as 'Chhatri making the site of the Empress Jodhbai's Tomb' or simply 'Jodhbai Ki Chhatri'.

== Issue ==
With Jahangir, Jagat had three children:

- Begum Sultan Begum (9 October 1590, Lahore, Mughal Empire – September 1591, Mughal Empire);
- Muhammad Khurram (5 January 1592, Lahore, Mughal Empire – 22 January 1666, Agra Fort, Agra, Mughal Empire, buried in Taj Mahal, Agra), succeeded Jahangir as the 5th Emperor as Shah Jahan;
- Luzzat-un-Nissa Begum ( 23 September 1597, Kashmir, Mughal Empire – c. 1603, Allahabad, Mughal Empire).

== In popular culture ==
- Jagat Gosain is a principal character in Indu Sundaresan's award-winning historical novel The Twentieth Wife (2002) as well as in its sequel The Feast of Roses (2003).
- Nayani Dixit portrayed Jagat Gosain in EPIC channel's historical drama Siyaasat. (based on Twentieth Wife)
- Jagat Gosain is a character in novel Nur Jahan's Daughter (2005) written by Tanushree Poddar.
- Jagat Gosain is a principal character in the novel Nurjahan: A historical novel by Jyoti Jafa.
- Jagat Gosain is a character in the novel Beloved Empress Mumtaz Mahal: A Historical Novel by Nina Consuelo Epton.
- Jagat Gosain as Jodh Bai is a character in Alex Rutherford's novel Ruler of the World(2011) as well as in its sequel The Tainted Throne (2012) of the series Empire of the Moghul.
- Jagat Gosain as Jodi Bai is a character in the novel Taj, a Story of Mughal India by Timeri Murari.
- Jagat Gosain was character in Doordarshan's 2001 TV series, Noorjahan.
- In the 2023 ZEE5's web series Taj: Divided by Blood, Jagat Gossain is portrayed by Tanvi Negi.

== Ancestry ==
Ancestors of Jagat Gosain

8. Ganga, Rao of Marwar
4. Maldeo, Rao of Marwar
9. Padma Bai of Sirohi
2. Udai Singh, Raja of Marwar
10. Jaito Sajavat Of Khairawa
5. Swarup Devi
1. Jagat Gosain
12. Bhim Singh, Raja of Amber
6. Askaran, Raja of Narwar
3. Manrang Devi

== Bibliography ==
- Findly, Ellison Banks (1993). Nur Jahan: Empress of Mughal India. Oxford University Press. ISBN 9780195360608.
