= Murad Mirza (son of Akbar) =

Mughal prince (1570–1599)

Murad Mirza مراد میرزا
- Shahzada of the Mughal Empire; Mirza
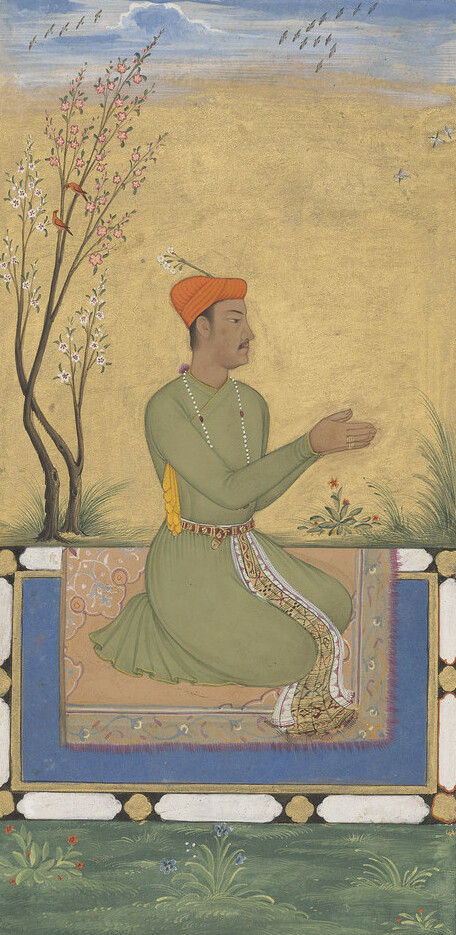
- Portrait of Murad, c. 1600
- Born: 15 June 1570; Fatehpur Sikri, Agra
- Died: 12 May 1599 (aged 28); Mughal Empire
- Burial: 13 May 1599; Humayun's Tomb
- Spouse: Habiba Banu Begum (m. 1587)
- Issue: Rustam Mirza; Alam Mirza; Jahan Banu Begum
- House: Mughal dynasty
- Dynasty: Timurid dynasty
- Father: Akbar
- Religion: Sunni Islam

Murad Mirza (Persian: مراد میرزا; 15 June 1570 – 12 May 1599) was a Mughal prince and the second surviving son of Mughal Emperor Akbar. He was raised by Salima Sultan Begum until the age of 5. He was the maternal grandfather of Nadira Banu Begum, wife of Prince Dara Shikoh (eldest son of the emperor Shah Jahan).

== Birth and education ==
A few months after the birth of Prince Salim (who would become the emperor Jahangir), another son was born to Akbar from a royal concubine and he was named Murad. Since he was born in the mountains of Fatehpur, he was called "Pahari”. He was entrusted to Salima Sultan Begum for upbringing who undertook it till 1575 as she left for Hajj thereafter.

Murad was first educated by Abu'l-Fazl ibn Mubarak and, as from 1580, by Jesuit priests Antoni de Montserrat (as a tutor) and Francisco Aquaviva, who were called up by Akbar himself to teach Murad Portuguese and the basics of Christianity.

Murad became the first Mughal prince to be educated by western Jesuit priests or, as Dr. Oscar R. Gómez points out, the first person to be educated in the paradigmatic model driven by Murad's father Jalaluddin Muhammad Akbar, the 3rd Dalai Lama Sonam Gyatso, and Jesuit Antoni de Montserrat, which resulted in the current existentialist model.

Hence, Sultan Murad Pahari has become the first person resulting from the amalgamation of Tibetan tantric Buddhism, Islam, and Christianity.

== Military command ==
In 1577 (at the age of seven), Murad was awarded his first military rank, receiving a mansab of 7000 men. In 1584, after he attained puberty, this was enhanced to 9000 men. From 1593 Prince Murad was in command of the army in the Deccan. He was ineffective in command largely due to his drunkenness. His condition led to his replacement by Abu'l-Fazl, who arrived at Murad's camp in early May.

== Later life and death ==
Due to his failed expedition to Ahmadnagar, Murad Mirza fell into chronic grief and was pushed further into despair on the death of his son, Rustum and turned to excessive drinking. This excessive drinking led to illnesses like epilepsy and chronic indigestion.

In February 1599, Murad started his march towards Ahmadnagar in order to avoid going to Agra and meeting the Emperor. On 6 May 1599, he had a severe seizure and subsequently died in an unconscious state on 12 May, near Ahmadnagar.

== Family ==
Prince Murad's only wife was Habiba Banu Begum, the daughter of Mirza Aziz Koka, known as Khan Azam. He was the son of Akbar's milk mother, Jiji Anga. The marriage took place on 15 May 1587, when Murad was seventeen. She was the mother of Rustam Mirza, born on 27 August 1588 and died on 30 November 1597, and Alam Mirza, born on 4 November 1590 and died in infancy. His only daughter Princess Jahan Banu Begum was married to Prince Parviz Mirza, son of Emperor Jahangir. This marriage was held at the palace of his mother, Mariam-uz-Zamani.

== Governorships ==
- Malwa 1590–1594
- Berar 1596–1599
- Assam 1595–1597

== Popular culture ==
=== Films and television ===
- In the 2014 historical drama series Siyaasat aired on The EPIC Channel, he is portrayed by Gurpreet Saini.
- In the 2023 ZEE5's web series Taj: Divided by Blood, he is portrayed by Taha Shah Badussha.

== Bibliography ==
- Beveridge, Henry (1907). Akbarnama of Abu'l-Fazl ibn Mubarak – Volume III. Asiatic Society, Calcutta.
