= Sahib Jamal =

Wife of Mughal Emperor Jahangir

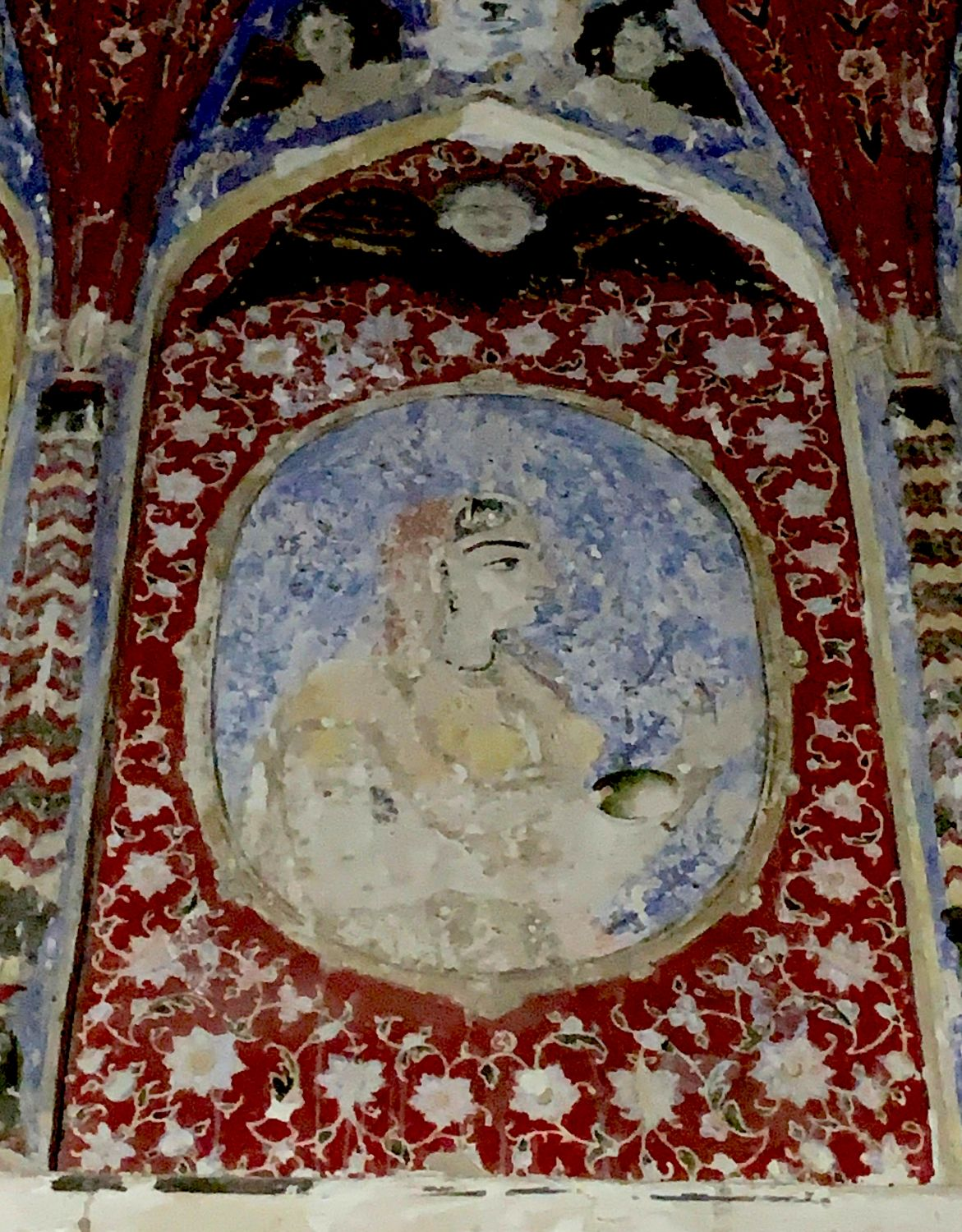
- A fresco portrait of Sahib Jamal.
- Born: Herat, Afghanistan
- Died: c. 25 June 1599; Lahore, Pakistan
- Burial: Tomb of Sahib Jamal, Lahore
- Spouse: Jahangir (m. 1586)
- Issue: Sultan Parviz Mirza; Two daughters
Names
- 'Persian _______ 'صاحب جمال
- House: Timurid (by marriage)
- Father: Khwaja Hasan
- Religion: Islam

Sahib Jamal (Persian: صاحب جمال; died c. 25 June 1599) was the wife of Prince Salim, the future Mughal emperor Jahangir and the mother of his second son, Prince Parviz.

== Family ==
Sahib Jamal was of Turkish origin and the daughter of a respected Muslim religious personality, Khwaja Hasan of Herat, making her the cousin of Zain Khan Koka, who was a leading official in the Mughal Empire under Akbar, and served for a time as governor of Kabul. Her father, Khwaja Hasan, was widely known for his scholarship and studies in the techniques of warfare. Akbar held him in high esteem, and often discussed with him the spiritual problems that often agitated his mind. Zain Khan's daughter, Khas Mahal was also married to Jahangir.

Sahib Jamal was a beautiful, highly cultured and well-educated woman, who was fully conversant with the rules and etiquettes of the palace.

== Marriage ==
Salim married her in 1586. Upon their marriage, she was given the title "Sahib Jamal", which literally means ("Paragon of Beauty") or ("Mistress of Beauty") which was chosen by Akbar himself, by which name she came to be styled thereafter.

Sahib Jamal bore her husband his second son, Sultan Parviz Mirza on November 1589.

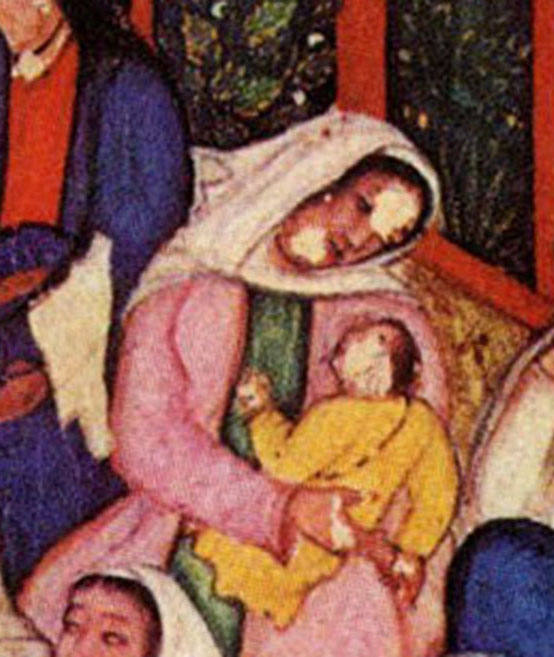
Sahib Jamal holding her son, Parviz.

In 1596 Salim became violently enamoured of Khas Mahal, the daughter of Zain Khan, and meditated marrying her. Akbar was displeased at the impropriety. The cause of Akbar's objection was Sahib Jamal who had already been married to Salim. Akbar objected to marriages between near relations. However, when Akbar saw that Salim's heart was immoderately affected, he, of necessity, gave his consent.

== Death and burial place ==
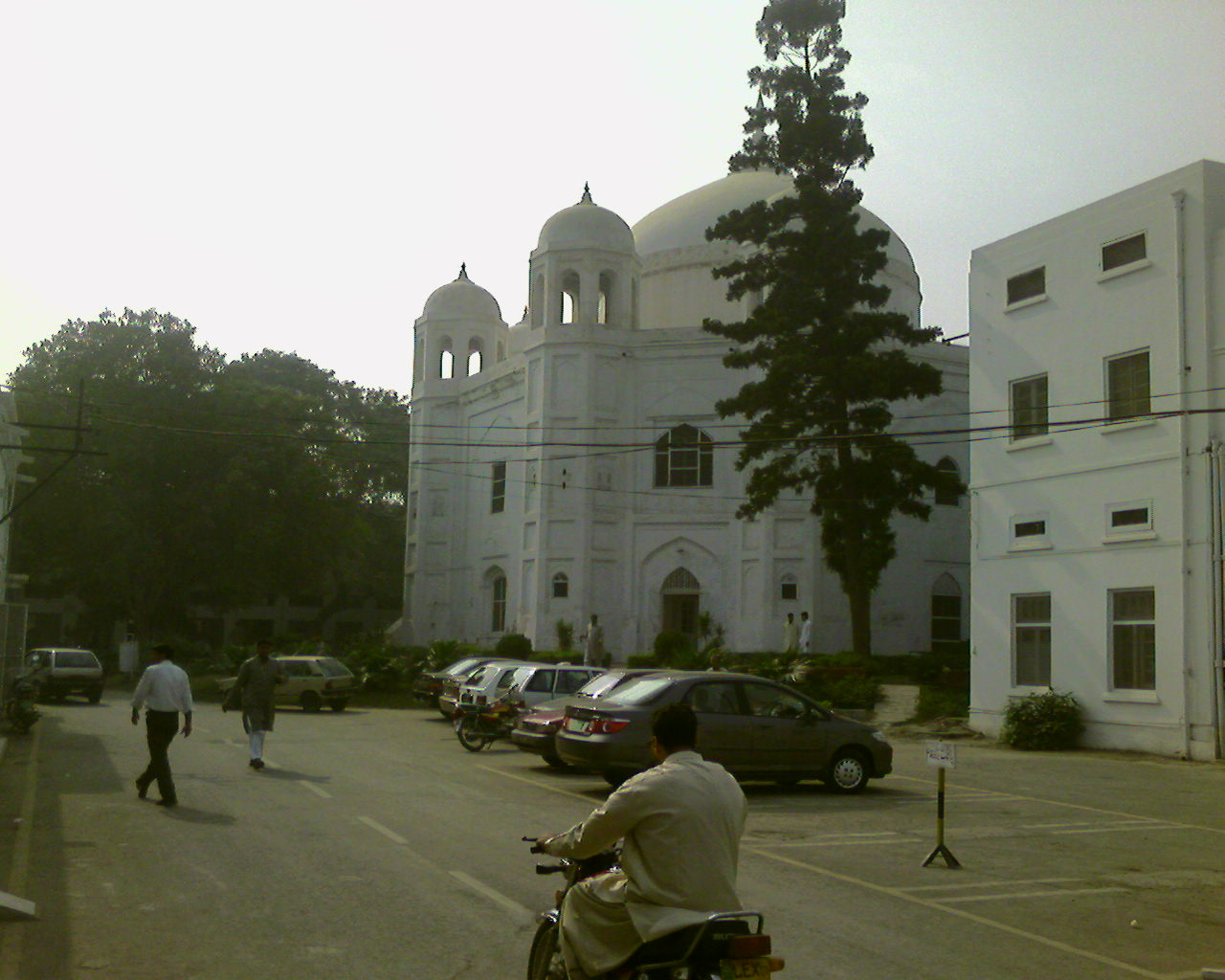
The tomb of Sahib Jamal in Lahore

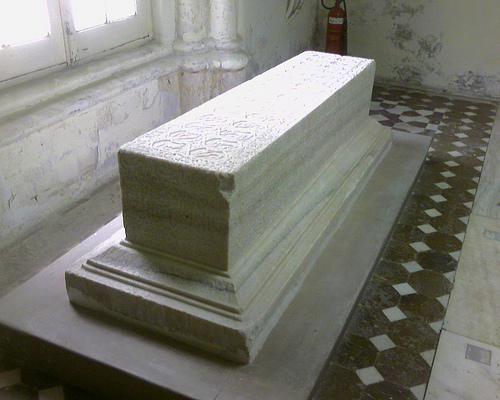
The richly carved cenotaph is made of white marble.

Sahib Jamal died c. 25 June 1599 in Lahore, present-day Pakistan, and was also buried there. Construction of her tomb dates to either 1599 C.E. or 1615 C.E.

There is a popular misconception that the Tomb of Sahib Jamal in Lahore is the tomb of the legendary dancing girl Anarkali. As per the legend, the tomb was said to be built by the Mughal emperor Jahangir for his love Anarkali, who was caught by Emperor Akbar for exchanging glances with Jahangir, at the time known as Prince Salim. Anarkali was reportedly a concubine of Akbar, and this action reportedly enraged Akbar so much, that he had Anarkali interred alive in a wall. When Prince Salim ascended the throne and took the name "Jahangir," he is reported to have ordered the construction of a tomb over the site of the wall in which Anarkali was reportedly buried.

18th-century historian Abdullah Chagatai reported that the tomb was not the resting place for Anarkali, but instead for Jahangir's beloved wife Sahib Jamal. Many modern historians accept the credibility of this account. The building is currently used as the Punjab Archives, so access to the public is limited.

Sahib Jamal's white marble cenotaph features carvings with the 99 names of God, and was described by 19th-century historians as "one of the finest pieces of carving in the world."

In addition to the 99 names of God, the cenotaph is inscribed with a Persian couplet written by the Emperor Jahangir which reads: "Ah! could I behold the face of my beloved once more, I would give thanks unto my God until the day of resurrection."

== Issue ==
With Jahangir, Sahib Jamal had three children:

- Parviz Mirza (10 November 1589, Kabul, Afghanistan – 28 October 1626, Burhanpur, Mughal Empire, buried in Bagh Sultan Parviz, Agra)
- A daughter (born 21 January 1591).
- A daughter (born 14 October 1594).

== Popular culture ==
=== Films and television ===
- In the 2023 ZEE5's web series Taj: Divided by Blood, she is portrayed by Janam Ra.
