= Rustam Mirza Safavi =

Safavid prince

Rustam Mirza
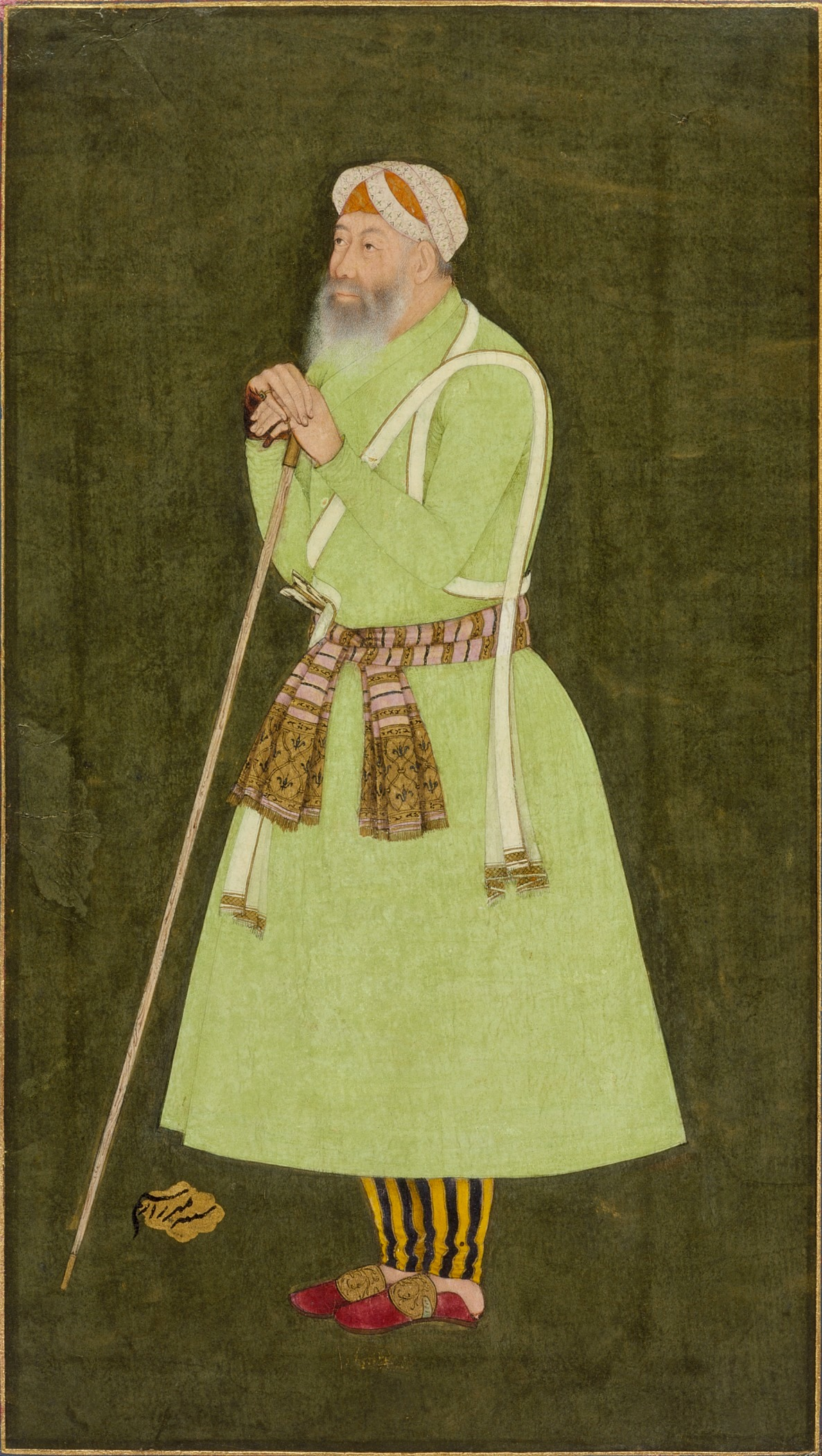
- Mughal portrait of Rustam Mirza by Hashim

Governor of Zamindawar and Garmsir
- Tenure: 1578–1593
- Predecessor: Soltan Hosayn Mirza
- Successor: Mozaffar-Hosayn Mirza
- Regent: Kur Hamza Beg

Subahdar of Multan
- Tenure: 1593–1597
- Predecessor: Muhib Ali Khan
- Successor: Said Khan

Subahdar of Thatta
- Tenure: 1612–1615
- Predecessor: Mirza Ghazi Beg
- Successor: Taj Khan Tash Beg

Subahdar of Allahabad
- Tenure: 1622–1626
- Predecessor: Parviz Mirza
- Successor: Jahangir Quli Khan

Subahdar of Bihar
- Tenure: 1626–1627/February 1628
- Predecessor: Parviz Mirza
- Successor: Khan-i-Alam
- Born: 1565
- Died: 1642 (aged 76–77)
- Issue Among others: Mirza Badi-uz-Zaman Safavi
- Dynasty: Safavid
- Father: Soltan Hosayn Mirza

Rustam Mirza Safavi (Persian: رستم‌میرزا صفوی; 1565–1642), known as Rustam Qandahari, (Note: Only Indian sources refer to Rustam and his family as 'Qandahari' (of Qandahar), this may have come from Rustam's attempts at presenting himself as the erstwhile ruler of Qandahar, even though he never held the title. William Finch, English merchant visiting the Mughal court in 1610, distinguishes Rustam Mirza from the other grandees by calling him "late [former] King of Candhar".) was an Iranian administrator, a prince of the Safavid dynasty, and an eminent grandee in the court of the Mughal Empire. Rustam Mirza belonged to a junior branch of the Imperial Safavids, who ruled over the Qandahar region. In 1578, at age 12, Rustam was appointed governor of Zamindawar and Garmsir (modern-day Afghanistan), by his cousin, Shah Mohammad Khodabanda. As an adult, Rustam became a significant destabilising force in the region, exercising semi-independent rule and launching invasions into neighboring Sistan and Qandahar to expand his domain, fostering a fierce rivalry with his brother, Mozaffar-Hosayn Mirza. In the early 1590s, his failed attempt to establish an independent realm in Khorasan prompted his defection to the Mughal Empire.

The Mughal emperors Akbar and Jahangir exploited Rustam's status as a Safavid prince. His elevation to the position of the subahdar of Multan, which was strategically located near Qandahar, in 1593, facilitated the peaceful Mughal acquisition of Qandahar in 1595. Rustam's growing influence within the Mughal administration, bolstered by his retinue, posed a latent threat to Safavid stability. He further entrenched his position through marital alliances, with two daughters marrying Mughal princes Parviz Mirza and Shah Shuja, and his eldest son wedded to the daughter of Abdul Rahim Khan-i-Khanan, a key Mughal noble. Until his death in 1642, Rustam remained a potential challenge to the Safavid shah, Abbas the Great, compelling the latter to maintain diplomatic relations with the Mughals to preempt any movement to place Rustam on the Safavid throne.

The Safavid chronicler Iskandar Beg Munshi, serving under Abbas I, downplayed Rustam Mirza's significance, portraying him and his family as marginal and non-threatening. This depiction likely served to justify Abbas's centralisation of power within the Safavid dynasty, which successfully subdued the main imperial line but could not neutralise Rustam's influence in Mughal India. Rustam's son, Mirza Badi-uz-Zaman went on to become a distinguished Mughal amir and Emperor Aurangzeb's father-in-law, further perpetuating the tradition for his family.

== Name ==
"Rustam" (Persian: رستم) derives from the Middle Persian Rōtastakhm potentially originating from the Avestan *raotas-taxma, meaning "having the strength of the stream." The name was chosen from the epic poem Shahnameh (lit. 'The Book of Kings'), a recurring trend among the Safavids, aiming at restoring and honouring Iranian culture and tradition. (Note: Ismail I, the founder of the Safavid dynasty, held the Shahnameh in high esteem, actively promoting its cultural significance. He named all his sons and many of his daughters after characters from the Shahnameh and encouraged a broader societal trend of adopting names from the epic. This practice marked a notable shift in Safavid naming conventions, influenced by the integration of Shiite culture and Turkish and Arabic linguistic elements.) In the Shahnameh, Rostam is a legendary hero from Sistan who becomes the protector of the Kayanian dynasty, kings of Iran, and their khvarenah, the divine glory symbolizing sovereignty and authority.

From the 15th century, the Persian title Mirza, derived from amir-zada (son of an amir), was incorporated into the royal titulature of the Timurid dynasty to designate princes, a practice later adopted by subsequent dynasties. In Safavid society, the placement of Mirza after a name signified the individual's status as a royal prince, whereas when placed before a name, it indicated membership in the bureaucratic or scholarly class.

== Background ==
=== Safavid appanage system ===
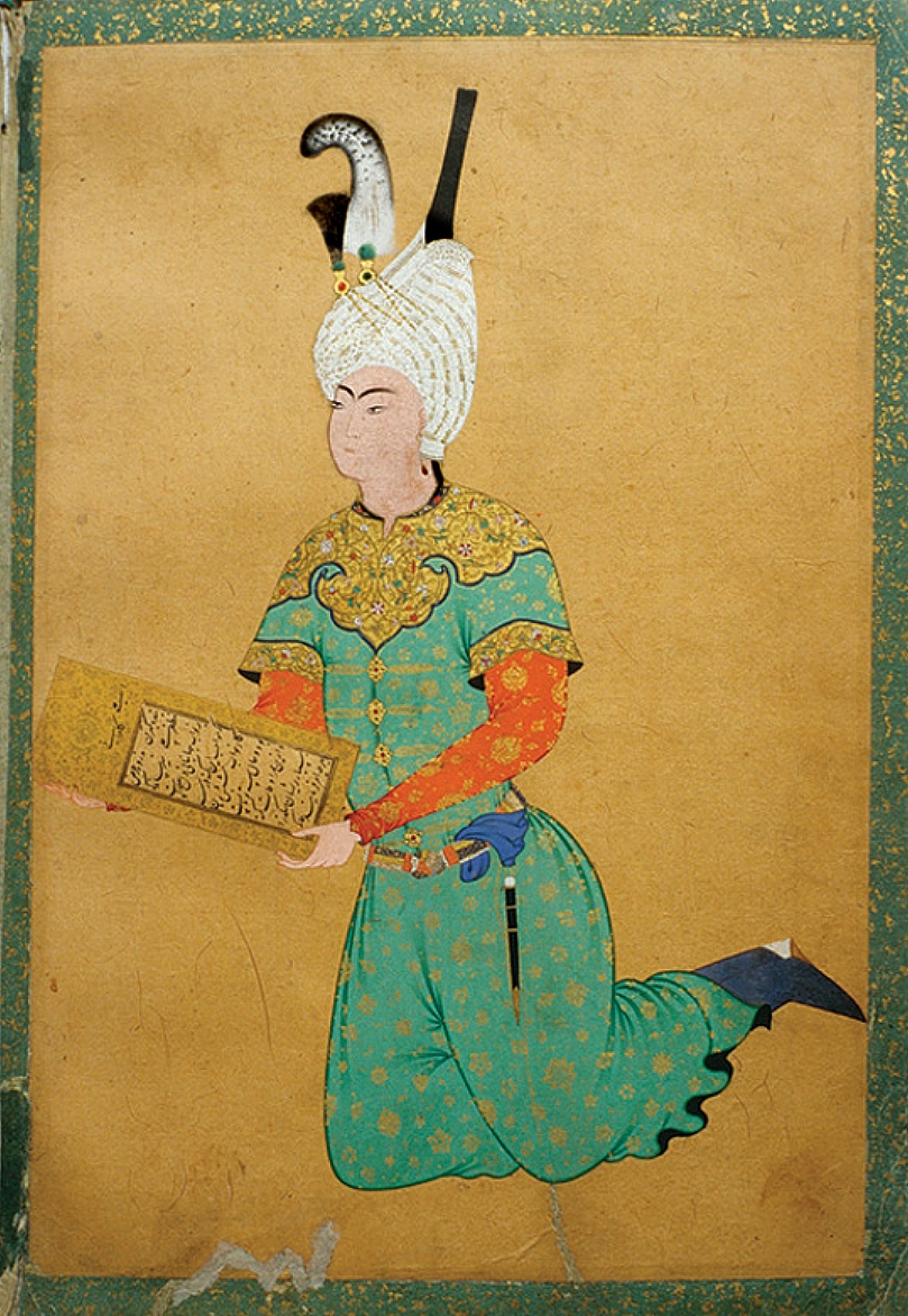
Bahram Mirza, grandfather of Rustam Mirza, kneeling and presenting a petition, by Muzaffar 'Ali, before 1549

The Safavid dynasty of Iran, founded by Shah Ismail I (r. 1501–1524) adhered to the Turco-Mongol tradition, whereby all male members of the dynasty were eligible for succession. The Safavids further legitimised their rule by claiming descent from Muhammad as sayyids, a status that endowed them with sacred and inviolable authority in the eyes of the Qizilbash, the Turkoman tribes forming the backbone of the Safavid military. (Note: This claim of sayyid descent, tracing back to the seventh imam, Musa al-Kazim, was propagated as early as the mid-15th century through fabricated genealogies. During the reign of Tahmasp I, the hagiography Safvat as-safa, chronicling the life of Safavid progenitor Safi-ad-Din Ardabili, was revised to obscure the dynasty's Kurdish origins and reinforce the sayyid claim.)

Under the second Safavid shah, Tahmasp I (r. 1524–1576) the Safavid appanage system assigned governorships to princely brothers, who were rotated across the empire and supervised by a Qizilbash lala (tutor) to prevent the establishment of hereditary power bases. However, this system carried risks, as evidenced by the rebellions of Sam Mirza and Alqas Mirza, supported by their lalas. Royal fratricide was generally avoided due to cultural disapproval and Tahmasp's brothers retained their potential threat until the end of their lives despite being imprisoned.

=== Bahrami Safavid lineage ===
Bahram Mirza, grandfather of Rustam Mirza and a full brother of Tahmasp I, remained consistently loyal to the shah, earning preferential treatment for his descendants. Unlike other princely offspring, Bahram's sons were granted governorships during adolescence, bypassing the need for a lala to mitigate Qizilbash influence, and were allowed prolonged tenure in their domains, contrary to Tahmasp's policy of rotation. In 1558, Badi-al Zaman Mirza was appointed governor of Sistan, while Soltan Hosayn Mirza, Rustam's father, seized Qandahar from the Mughal Empire; both retained their positions for life. Rustam Mirza was born c. 1565 in Qandahar.

Tahmasp's son and successor, Ismail II (r. 1576–1577) diverged from Turco-Mongol tradition by executing all his brothers except Mohammad Khodabanda. (Note: Ismail may have been influenced by the 1574 royal purge of Murad III (r. 1574–1595), the Ottoman sultan, who executed all of his brothers to secure his throne. Comparable instances of fratricide or marginalization of princely kin occurred elsewhere in the Turco-Persian world. In the Khanate of Bukhara, Khan Abdul-Mo'min's killing of numerous male relatives failed to stabilize his rule, leading to his assassination in 1598 and the collapse of the Shaybanid dynasty. Similarly, in the Mughal Empire, Akbar (r. 1556–1605) abolished the tradition of princely appanages by confining the sons of Mirza Muhammad Hakim, his nephews, to the court, thereby stripping them of political influence and preventing their inheritance of Kabul. These late 16th-century developments reflect a broader trend toward centralisation in Turco-Persian empires, achieved by eliminating collateral cadet branches to consolidate imperial authority.) The three sons of Bahram Mirza—Ibrahim, Badi-al Zaman and Soltan Hosayn—sought to establish independent domains, wary of Ismail II's intentions. Their failed attempts and subsequent deaths in 1577 prompted Ismail to target the Bahrami lineage for elimination. He killed Soltan Hosayn's eldest son, who was present in his court in Qazvin and then, according to the contemporary historian Iskandar Beg Munshi, sent the orders for the murder of Soltan Hosayn's four remaining sons kept in Qandahar. However, Ismail's death and his succession by his brother, Mohammad Khodabanda (r. 1578–1587), halted these plans.

== Regional agitator ==
=== Conflict with brother ===
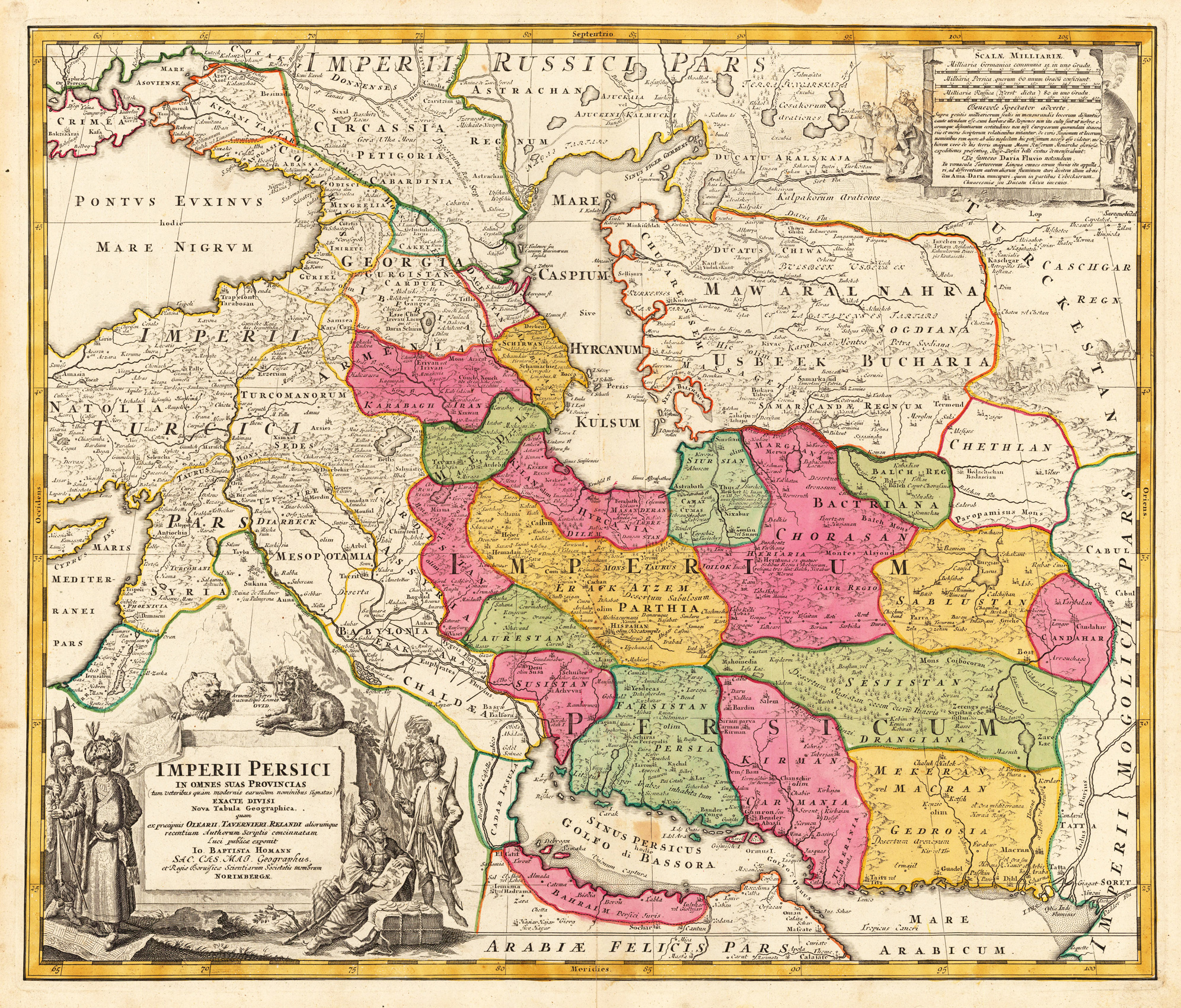
Map of Safavid Iran, c. 1720. Qandahar and Sistan are located on the far eastern part of the map.

In 1578, Rustam Mirza Safavi was appointed governor of Zamindawar and Garmsir at the age of 12, a decision stemming from Mohammad Khodabanda's reinstatement of the Turco-Mongol tradition of tolerating cadet branches within the Safavid dynasty. Mohammad Khodabanda divided the Qandahar region among the sons of Soltan Hosayn Mirza, assigning Qandahar to the elder Mozaffar-Hosayn Mirza (aged 15) and granting Zamindawar and Garmsir to Rustam. (Note: This decision was influenced by the Qandahar elite, who favoured the continued rule of Soltan Hosayn's sons in the region over their relocation to the royal court in Qazvin.) Abu Sa'id and Sanjar, Rustam's younger brothers, were entrusted to his care. Kur Hamza Beg, a Dhu'l-Qadr tribe member and former advisor to Soltan Hosayn, was appointed as the joint vakil (regent). With this act, Mohammad Khodabanda formalised Qandahar as a princely appanage inherited by the sons of Soltan Hosayn.

Despite Zamindawar's agricultural productivity, Rustam found the revenues from his territories insufficient compared to Qandahar, a hub of international trade, sparking a rivalry with Mozaffar-Hosayn over their inheritance. Hamza Beg sided with Rustam due to Mozaffar's strained relationship with his vakil. In 1581, Rustam and Hamza briefly occupied Qandahar, capturing Mozaffar but sparing his life in adherence to Safavid ideological principles. From 1585, as the brothers reached adulthood, they faced increasing external and internal pressures.

The brothers also vied for control of Sistan, previously governed by their uncle Badi-al Zaman Mirza and, after his death, by Najm al-Din Mahmud of the local Mihrabanid dynasty, whose rule was confirmed by Mohammad Khodabanda. Disputing this, Rustam and Mozaffar invaded Sistan but failed to secure it. A peace agreement followed, stipulating that Mozaffar marry Najm al-Din's daughter, Najm al-Din's son wed Hamza Beg's daughter, and Najm al-Din acknowledge Mozaffar and his descendants with deference. Rustam, perceiving a threat from Mozaffar's alliance with Sistan, continued their conflict, but Mozaffar, bolstered by Sistan's support, prevailed in subsequent battles. In 1589, Mozaffar executed Hamza Beg and his immediate successor, consolidating sole authority over Qandahar. In 1590, Rustam launched a final campaign in Sistan, killing Najm al-Din but was expelled by Najm al-Din's son, Jalal al-Din. Thereafter, Rustam redirected his efforts toward Khorasan, marking the end of his campaigns in Sistan and Qandahar.

=== Conquests in Khorasan ===
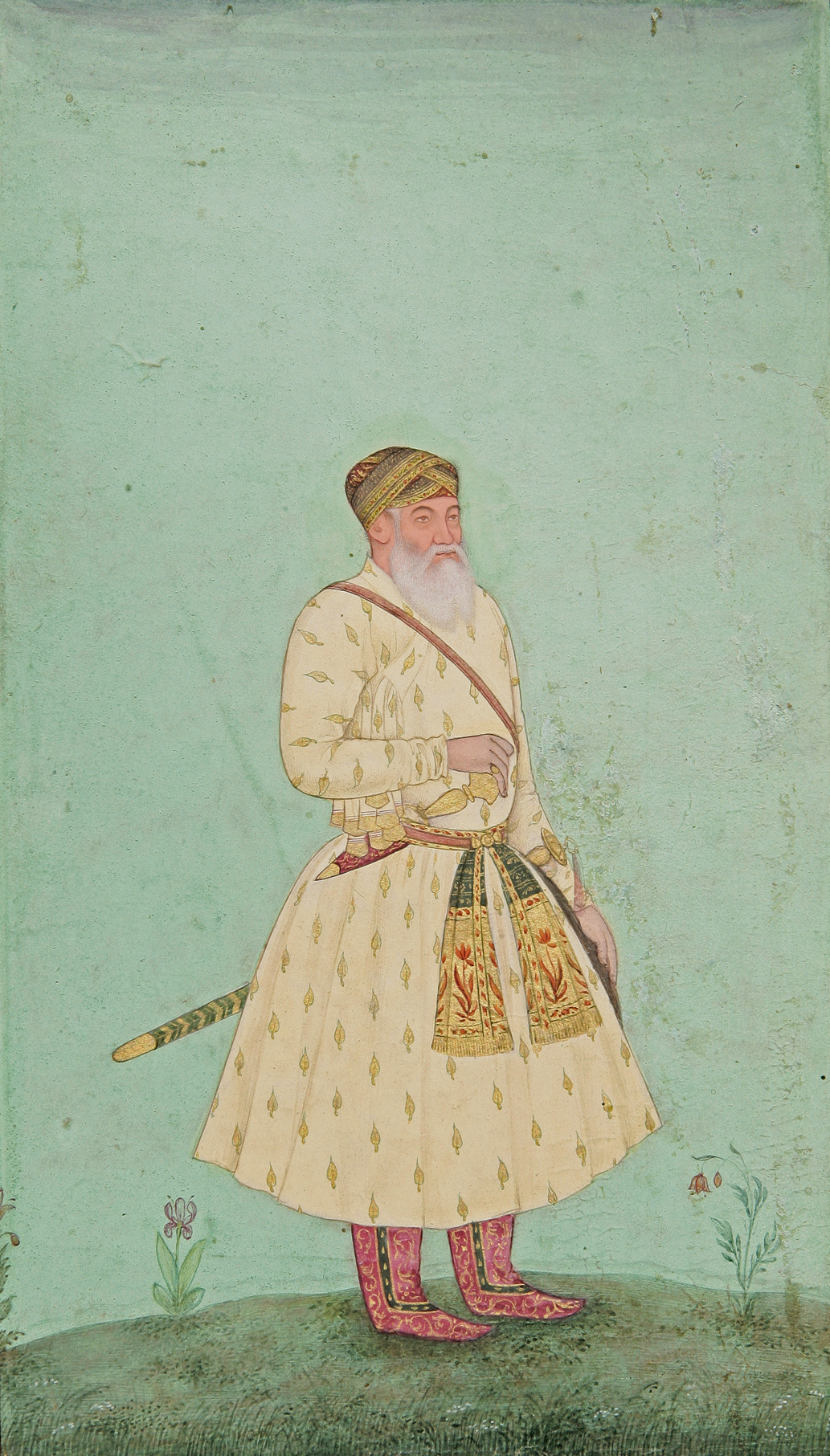
Portrait of Rustam Mirza Safavi, anonymous, late 17th Century.

In 1587, Abdullah Khan II, Uzbek ruler of Bukhara, launched an invasion into the Khorasan province of Safavid Iran and captured many of the core settlements of the province, such as Herat, Mashhad and Nishapur. The new shah of Iran and Khodabanda's son and successor, Abbas I (r. 1587–1629) mounted two unsuccessful campaigns against the Uzbeks in 1588 and 1589. The failure of the 1589 campaign led Suleiman Khalifa, the governor of Mashhad, to seek assistance from Rustam Mirza to counter the Uzbek occupation, a call supported by the Qizilbash amirs of Farah and Hazarajat. Disaffected factions, particularly former allies of Murshid Quli Khan Ustajlu, rallied to Rustam and proclaimed him their shah. (Note: Ustajlu was Abass' former lala and the main element behind Abass' ascension. He wished to use the new shah as a pawn but was assassinated by Abass' men. He had a strong network of supporters in Khorasan that were enraged by his assassination and thus began supporting Rustam Mirza.) Consequently, in the early 1590s, Rustam emerged as a rival claimant to Abbas I among the Qizilbash, challenging Safavid central authority.

Rustam Mirza's venture into Khorasan began with his victory over an Uzbek raiding expedition from Samarkand who had murdered the merchants of a caravan. By avenging their death, Rustam increased his popularity in the region. He established his court in Farah and began appointing governors to all cities of the province, although his authority was limited to the southern parts of Khorasan. He also promoted Suleiman Khalifa's position, possibly appointing him as his vakil. He sent envoys to Kerman, Fars and Sistan, inciting them to join his newly-founded polity—which the modern historian Liesbeth Geevers dubbed the "Bahrami empire"—headed either by Rustam himself or by his elder brother, perhaps nominally, to display a united front. Najm al-Din Mahmud refused the offer, which initiated Rustam's 1590 invasion into Sistan and furthermore thwarted his plan.

This failure instead revitalised Rustam's Khorasan policy and strengthened the morale of his Qizilbash amirs. He sent Suleiman Khalifa to recapture Ferdows and Torshiz from Uzbek occupation. The latter's Uzbek governor escaped to Khaf, where Din Mohammad Khan, the senior commander of the Uzbek army, resided. The two armies met in Azghand in 1593 and during the ensuing battle, Suleiman Khalifa was killed and Rustam's forces were defeated. According to the contemporary historian Mirza Beg Jonabadi, in the midst of the battle the Qizilbash received news that Shah Abbas had appointed Suleiman Khalifa as the new Governor of Khorasan. Their anger caused mayhem in the Qizilbash ranks and eventually most of the amirs deserted the army.

Following the decline of Rustam's authority, he lost control of the regions of Zamindawar and Garmsir. The identity of the conqueror of Zamindawar is debated. According to Liesbeth Geevers, Abdullah Khan II sent his nephews to seize Rustam's territories. Conversely, the Encyclopaedia of Muslim Biography asserts that Rustam's brother launched a rapid invasion of Zamindawar, capitalising on Rustam's weakened prestige. Rustam, accompanied by his remaining household, withdrew to Qalat. During a hunting expedition, the local Bayat tribe revolted against his rule in Qalat. Despite resistance led by Rustam's mother, the Bayats captured the city and killed her. Rustam swiftly returned, quelled the rebellion, and executed numerous tribesmen. Facing increasing isolation, with no support from neighboring provinces or the central government under Abbas I, Rustam sought assistance from the Mughal Empire.

=== Emigration to India ===
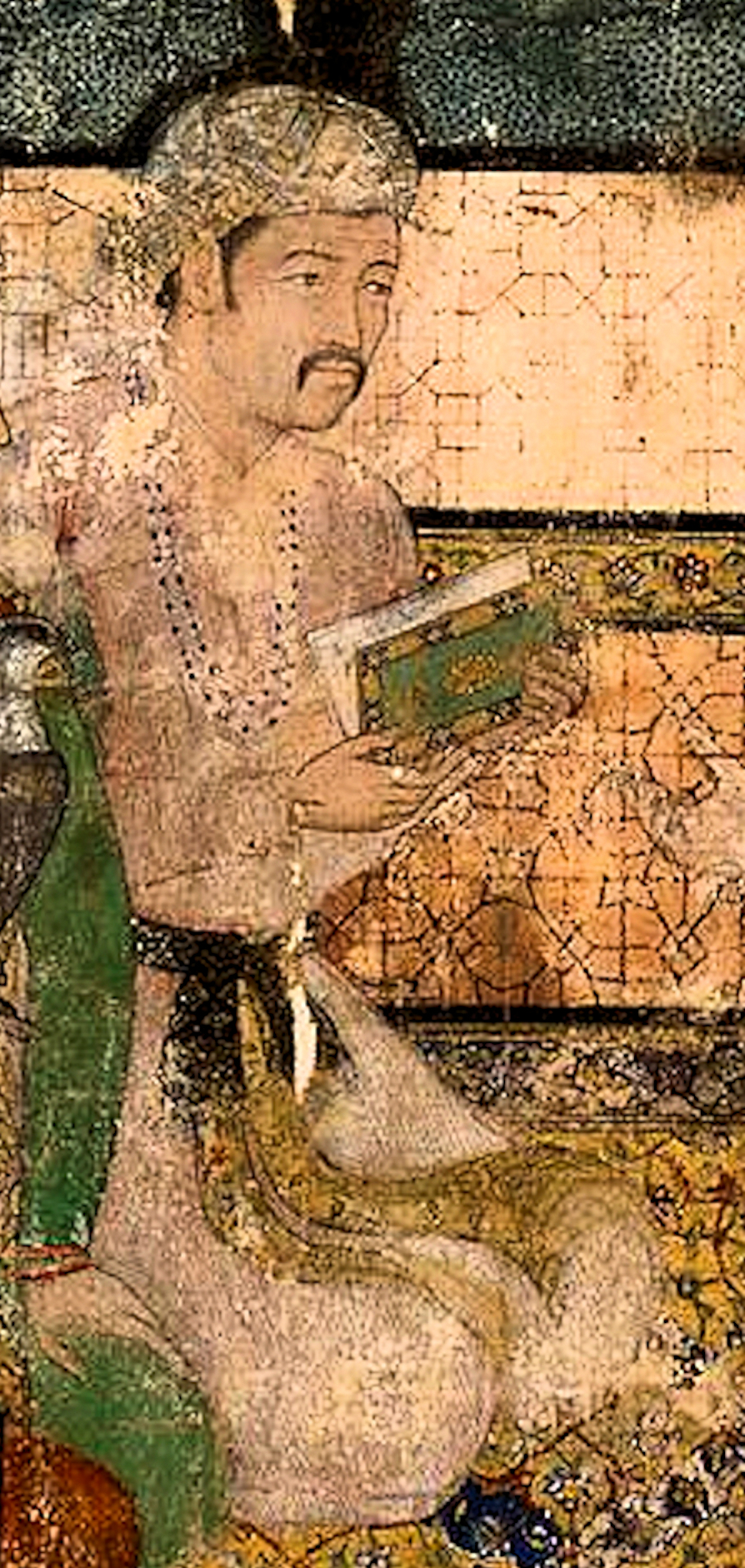
Detail of the Mughal Emperor Akbar from Princes of the House of Timur, probably by Abd al-Samad, c. 1550-55, British Museum, London.

In 1591, Rustam Mirza initiated contact with the Mughal emperor Akbar (r. 1556–1605), who sought to extend his dominion over Qandahar. By early 1593, with most of his territories overrun by hostile forces, Rustam, holding only the city of Qalat, sought an alliance with Akbar. He communicated through Sharif Khan Atga, whom Akbar had appointed governor of Ghazni and trusted as a mediator, expressing his willingness to enter Mughal service and offering Qalat as a token of loyalty.

Rustam also engaged Abdul Rahim Khan-i-Khanan, a prominent Mughal aristocrat, to facilitate negotiations, including with the ruler of Thatta, fostering a lasting and beneficial alliance. (Note: The alliance between Rustam Mirza and Abdul Rahim Khan-i-Khanan was informed by a historical precedent referenced in their correspondence. In 1544, when Mughal Emperor Humayun, displaced by the Afghan ruler Sher Shah Suri, sought refuge at the Safavid court of Shah Tahmasp I, he was accompanied by Bairam Khan, a prominent nobleman and the father of Khan-i-Khanan. During this period, Bairam Khan formed a significant connection with Tahmasp's sister, Mahinbanu Sultan, who, by Tahmasp's decree, remained unmarried in anticipation of her destined union with the Hidden Imam, Mahdi. This relationship, possibly romantic, is suggested in the Princely Lovers, a painting attributed to Mirza Ali, created between c. 1540 – c. 1555. In their letters, Rustam and Khan-i-Khanan frequently cited this earlier bond as a providential omen, framing their own friendship and partnership as a continuation of a divinely ordained alliance.) For Akbar and his minister Abul Fazl, securing Rustam's allegiance was strategically vital, as it offered a low-cost opportunity to capture Qandahar, especially given the Mughal Empire's ongoing challenges in Kabul and Kashmir. The concurrent conflict between Abbas I and the Uzbeks in Khorasan further enabled Akbar to pursue this opportunity. Rustam's submission, as a Safavid prince and pretender, also enhanced the Mughal Empire's universalist ideological claims.

In the late summer of 1593, Rustam Mirza surrendered the keys of Qalat to a Mughal representative, likely Sharif Khan Atga, in exchange for safe passage and provisions to join Akbar's court. Accompanied by his younger brother Sanjar Mirza, his four sons (Murad, Shahrukh, Hasan, and Ibrahim), his staff, and approximately 400 Qizilbash retainers, Rustam faced repeated Uzbek attempts to intercept his caravan.

On October 4, 1593, the entourage reached the Chenab River near Lahore, where Akbar was encamped. They were received by a subordinate of Abdul Rahim Khan-i-Khanan, possibly linked to Rustam's connections, and accommodated in tents by the river, with tents, carpets, and other items dispatched from the imperial stores via Qara Beg Turkman. Hakim-ul-Mulk, a Mughal diplomat, presented Rustam with a ceremonial belt and bejeweled dagger, and a delegation of amirs, including Sharif Khan Atga, Asaf Khan, and Shah Beg Khan, escorted him to a point four kos (approximately 18 kilometers) from Lahore. There, Khan-i-Khanan and Zain Khan Koka, one of Akbar's milk brothers, took over the escort.

On October 8, 1593, during the Hindu festival of Dussehra, commemorating Rama's victory over Ravana, Rustam and his retinue entered Lahore and proceeded to the palace, where he swore allegiance to Akbar. Rustam was granted a high-ranking mansab (courtly rank) of 5,000/1,500, (Note: An abbreviation to denote the number of zat (infantry)/sawar (cavalry) seconded from the imperial army to a nobleman's command. At the time of Akbar's reign, the mansab of 5,000 was the maximum and highest rank allowed for non-royal grandees.) symbolising his command over a substantial force and proximity to the emperor, along with a gift of one crore of muradi tankas, the subahdary (governorship) of Multan, which bordered Qandahar, and several parganas (groups of villages) in Balochistan. Later, he received a flag and drum, further signifying his status. His brother, Mirza Abu Sa'id, who had remained in Qandahar, also joined Mughal service. Rustam's significant receptions, accompanied by the elaborate protocol and laden with astrological considerations and religious symbolism, underscored his importance for the emperor. (Note: The reception of Rustam Mirza can be compared to that of two Timurid rulers of Badakhshan. In 1575, Suleiman Mirza, a distant relative of Akbar and a Timurid ruler, was personally received by Akbar at the gates of Fatehpur Sikri, an exceptional gesture, when he sought the Mughal emperor's protection. Similarly, in 1584, Mirza Shah Rukh, Suleiman's grandson, fleeing Uzbek pressure in Badakhshan, was escorted to the Lahore court by Prince Daniyal Mirza and Sheikh Ebrahim Chishti, highlighting the ceremonial importance of such receptions.)

== In the Mughal court ==
=== Under Akbar ===
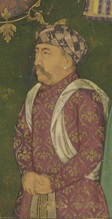
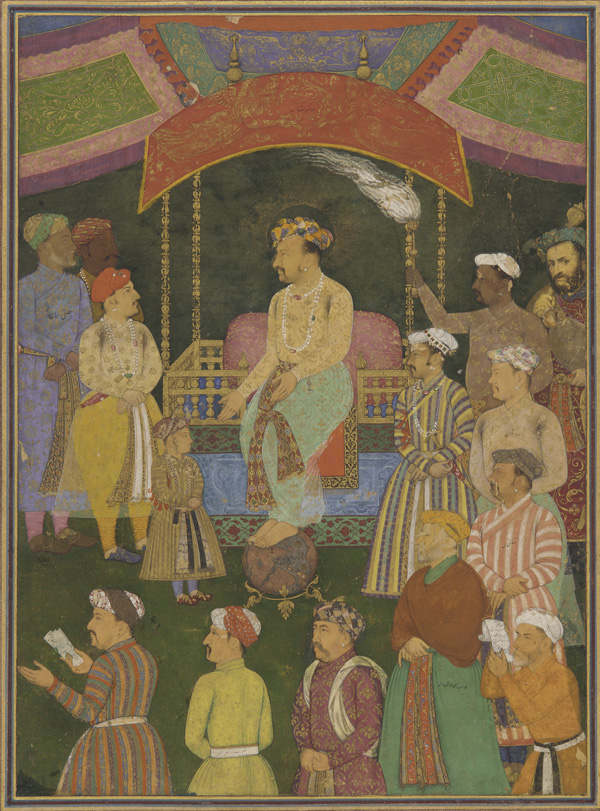
Detail of Rustam Mirza Safavi from Jahangir Receiving Sheikh Sa'di in Audience by Abu'l-Hasan, a double page composition depicting Mughal Emperor Jahangir surrounded by his courtiers on the left panel and anachronistically showing the 13th-century Persian poet Saadi Shirazi presenting his book to the emperor on the right (not shown here), c. 1615.

The strategic proximity of Multan to Qandahar, combined with Rustam Mirza's elevated mansab rank of 5,000 and substantial subsidy of 100 lakhs of muradi tankas (around 400,000 rupees), indicates, according to Ibáñez, that Akbar explicitly recognised Rustam as a legitimate claimant to Qandahar and intended for him to pursue its conquest. The funds provided, equivalent to nearly fifty times the annual salary of a yuzbashi (a commander of 100), would enable Rustam to maintain a force of approximately 5,000 cavalrymen. Conversely, the grandeur of Akbar's reception of Rustam may also have been intended to persuade Mozaffar-Hosayn Mirza, then engaged in conflicts with the Uzbeks, to surrender Qandahar to the Mughals, presenting India as a secure refuge for him and his family.

Nevertheless, Akbar's recognition of Rustam Mirza's status facilitated a strategic marital alliance, with Rustam arranging the marriage of his eldest son to the daughter of Abdul Rahim Khan-i-Khanan before leaving Lahore in 1593. Emulating Khan-i-Khanan's approach, Rustam refrained from joining Akbar's Din-i Ilahi, the syncretic religious movement promoted by the emperor among his key courtiers.

In 1594, Rustam Mirza assumed the governorship of Multan and began administering the region. According to Abul Fazl's Ain-i-Akbari, Rustam's rule was marked by oppressive governance, with his subordinates engaging in excessive exploitation of the populace. Consequently, local complaints reached Akbar, who, by the end of the same year, relocated Rustam to the sarkar of Chittor. Ibáñez, citing Ma'asir al-Umara by Samsam ud Daula Shah Nawaz Khan, places this transfer in 1597, following the Mughal acquisition of Qandahar in 1595. He further argues that Akbar's primary objective was securing Qandahar, and Rustam's heavy taxation in Multan—described as "desolating the population" in Muntakhab-ut-Tawarikh by ʽAbd al-Qadir Badayuni—was part of the mirza's efforts to finance and lead a potential Mughal invasion of the city. Singh expresses uncertainty about Rustam's whereabouts in 1595, noting that he was summoned to Akbar's court from the sarkar of Sirhind, in the subah of Delhi northwest of Multan, rather than Chittor in Rajasthan, concluding that Rustam may have remained active in the greater Punjab area.

In 1595, Mozzafar-Hosayn Mirza, Rustam's brother, defected to the Mughal Empire and ceded sovereignty of Qandahar to the Mughals. To secure the region, Akbar dispatched an army of 10,000 in March 1595, but by April, rebellions erupted in Zamindawar and Garmsir, led by forces loyal to Rustam's rule. Acknowledging the potential instability of appointing Rustam, a local Safavid prince, as governor of Qandahar, Akbar opted to prevent the Bahrami-Safavid lineage from reclaiming regional influence by assigning its members prestigious but distant administrative roles. (Note: Akbar employed a similar strategy in two comparable cases to manage displaced rulers. Yousuf Shah Chak of the Kashmir Sultanate, ousted by the Mughal invasion of 1586, was granted the minor subahdary of Bihar with a modest sowar of 300. Similarly, Mirza Jani Beg Tarkhan of Thatta, whose political legitimacy was questioned by Mughal authorities, was elevated to a high status at Akbar's court with a mansab rank of 5,000 and a marriage alliance to a Mughal general's daughter, but was reassigned to the Deccan Plateau.)

Thus in the same year, Mozzafar-Hosayn gained the jagir (land grant) of Sambhal and Rustam's fief was expanded to include the rebellious northern Pathan hills, where he was dispatched with a Mughal army to subdue the leader of the mountain chieftains, Raja Basu Dev of Nurpur. Despite tensions with his second-in-command, Asaf Khan, Rustam Mirza successfully led his Mughal forces through the Pathan hills and besieged the fort of Mankot, capturing Raja Basu within two months. Rustam then escorted Raja Basu to Lahore, where, in the presence of Akbar, Basu agreed to cede the Pathan region to the Mughal Empire. In 1597, Rustam was granted the governorship of Raisen and its surrounding estates, where he resided for a period.

Since 1600, Mughal forces under Daniyal Mirza, Akbar's son, were engaged in a protracted siege of Ahmednagar Fort during their campaign against the Nizam Shahi dynasty of Ahmednagar. The prolonged operation resulted in severe resource shortages and frequent enemy raids, placing the Mughal troops in a precarious position. In response to Daniyal's call for reinforcements, Akbar sent Rustam Mirza from Burhanpur with an army and a substantial grant of one lakh ashrafis (gold coins), into the Deccan Plateau. Rustam joined forces with Abdul Rahim Khan-i-Khanan, the sipah-salar (commander-in-chief) of the Mughal invasion, and fought in the final assault that led to the conquest of Ahmednagar.

In 1604, Khan-i-Khanan tasked Rustam and his son Iraj with leading a contingent of seasoned soldiers to the northern bank of the Bhima River to escort Sultan Begum, daughter of Ibrahim Adil Shah II of Bijapur and the bride-to-be of Daniyal Mirza, to Ahmednagar for their wedding. In April 1604, Rustam's party reached Sultan Begum's camp, where he met Asad Beg Qazvini, an Iranian noble in Akbar's service who later documented the event in his memoirs. Asad Beg records that Rustam, accompanied by his Rajput soldiers, formed the advance guard of the entourage, successfully escorting the princess to Ahmednagar before Daniyal Mirza's arrival, thereby completing the mission.

=== Under Jahangir ===
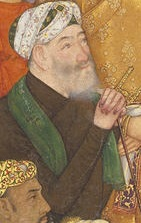
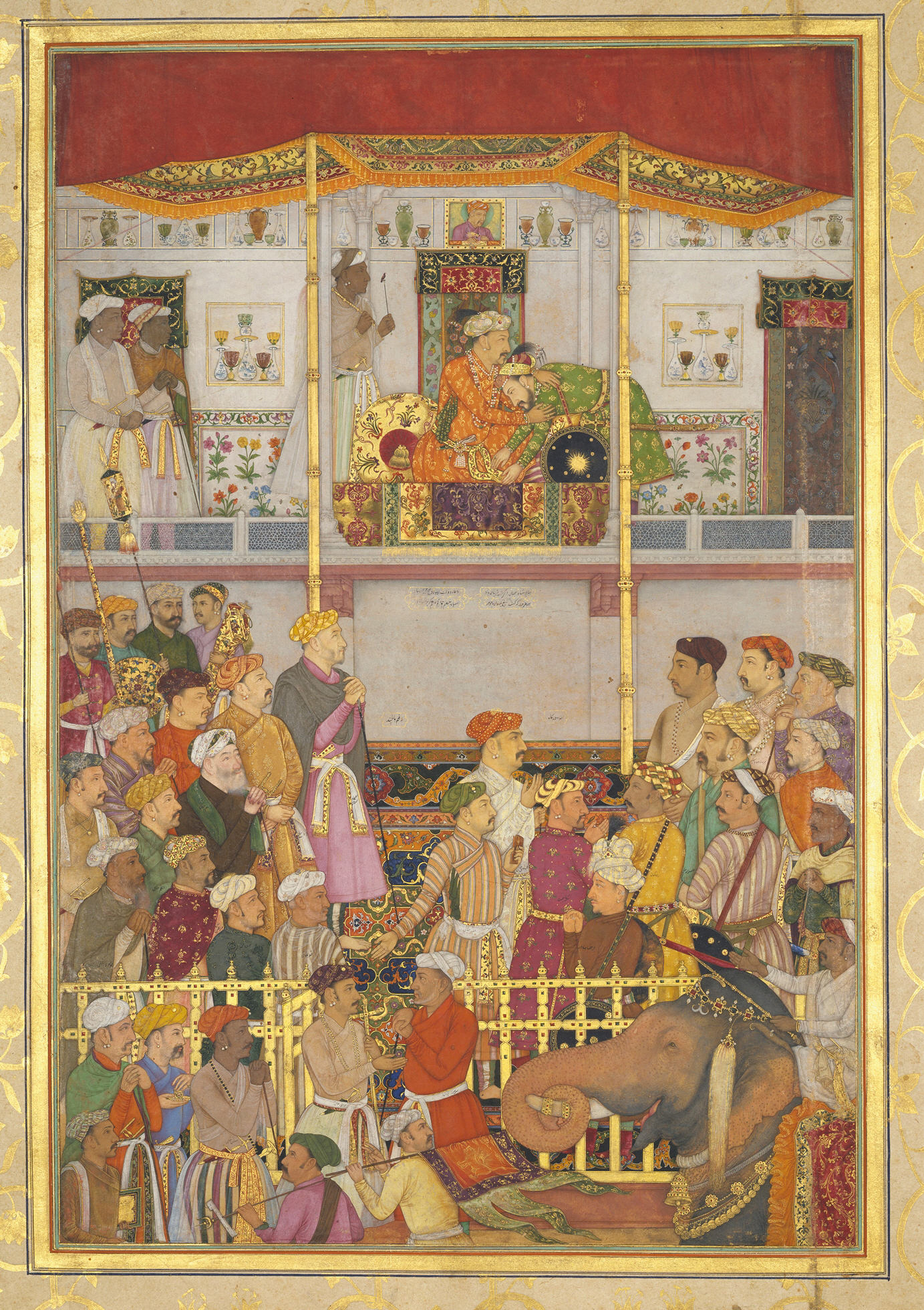
Detail of Rustam Mirza Safavi as one of the courtiers of Ajmer in Jahangir Receives Prince Khurram at Ajmer on His Return from the Mewar Campaign by Balchand, c. 1635, part of the Padshahnama

During the early years of Emperor Jahangir's reign (r. 1605–1627), Rustam Mirza remained active in the Deccan Plateau, dedicating significant efforts to suppressing Malik Ambar, the leader of the Nizam Shahi resistance. Despite his endeavours, Rustam was unable to subdue the resilient opposition. and was thus recalled by Jahangir to Agra in 1612. Since his arrival at the royal court coincided with the death of Mirza Ghazi Beg of Thatta, Jahangir elevated his mansab to 5000/5000, which was Ghazi Beg's own rank and appointed him the subahdar of Thatta.

According to Ma'asir al-umara, the emperor provided Rustam with guidance on administering justice and instructed him to expel the Turco-Mongol Arghun dynasty and its cadet branch, the Tarkhans, who had dominated the region since the early 16th century, along with their long-standing vakil, Khusrau Khan the Circassian, who had served their family for four generations, to prevent potential rebellions. Mir Abdur Razzaq, a member of the distinguished Iranian Ma'muri family, was appointed as Rustam Mirza's treasurer in Thatta. His duties included overseeing revenue disbursements, assessing the jama dami (revenue assessment), and allocating jagirs to Rustam and his dependents.

Although Rustam was able to completely eradicate any remaining Arghun-Tarkhan influence over the Sindh, his governance was marked by excessive harshness, leading to numerous complaints. Consequently, in 1615, Jahangir recalled Rustam to court and briefly imprisoned him in Gwalior under the supervision of Anup Rai, the head jailer, where his oppressive tendencies were "cured". Shortly thereafter, Rustam was released, welcomed back to court with favour, and had his daughter married to Jahangir's son, Parviz Mirza. Rustam was promoted to a mansab rank of 6,000 and appointed subahdar of Allahabad.

During the rebellion of Prince Khurram (future Shah Jahan, r. 1628–1658) in 1622, Rustam was tasked with safeguarding the eastern territories of Allahabad against the rebel forces. Following the capture of Jaunpur by Khurram's troops, Rustam provided refuge to the city's fugitive governor, Jahangir Quli Khan, and organised defenses to counter the advancing rebel army. Khurram deployed Abdullah Khan to seize Allahabad, and the commander established a camp at Jhusi, across the Ganges River from the city. Rustam and his forces withdrew to the Allahabad Fort in response. Abdullah Khan crossed the river using boats, launching a siege with artillery and muskets, and briefly entered the city. Despite assurances from Rumi Khan, head of Khurram's artillery, that the fort's capture was imminent, Abdullah Khan, displaying unexpected hesitation, withdrew back to Jhusi. Shortly thereafter, the approaching imperial forces relieved the siege. Rustam was recalled from Allahabad after the end of the rebellion in 1626 and reassigned to govern Bihar. He served as the final subahdar of Bihar under Jahangir. Rustam's tenure ended either in 1627, shortly after Jahangir's death or in February 1628, when Shah Jahan replaced him with Mirza Bar Khurdar, also known as Khan-i-Alam.

=== Later years and death ===
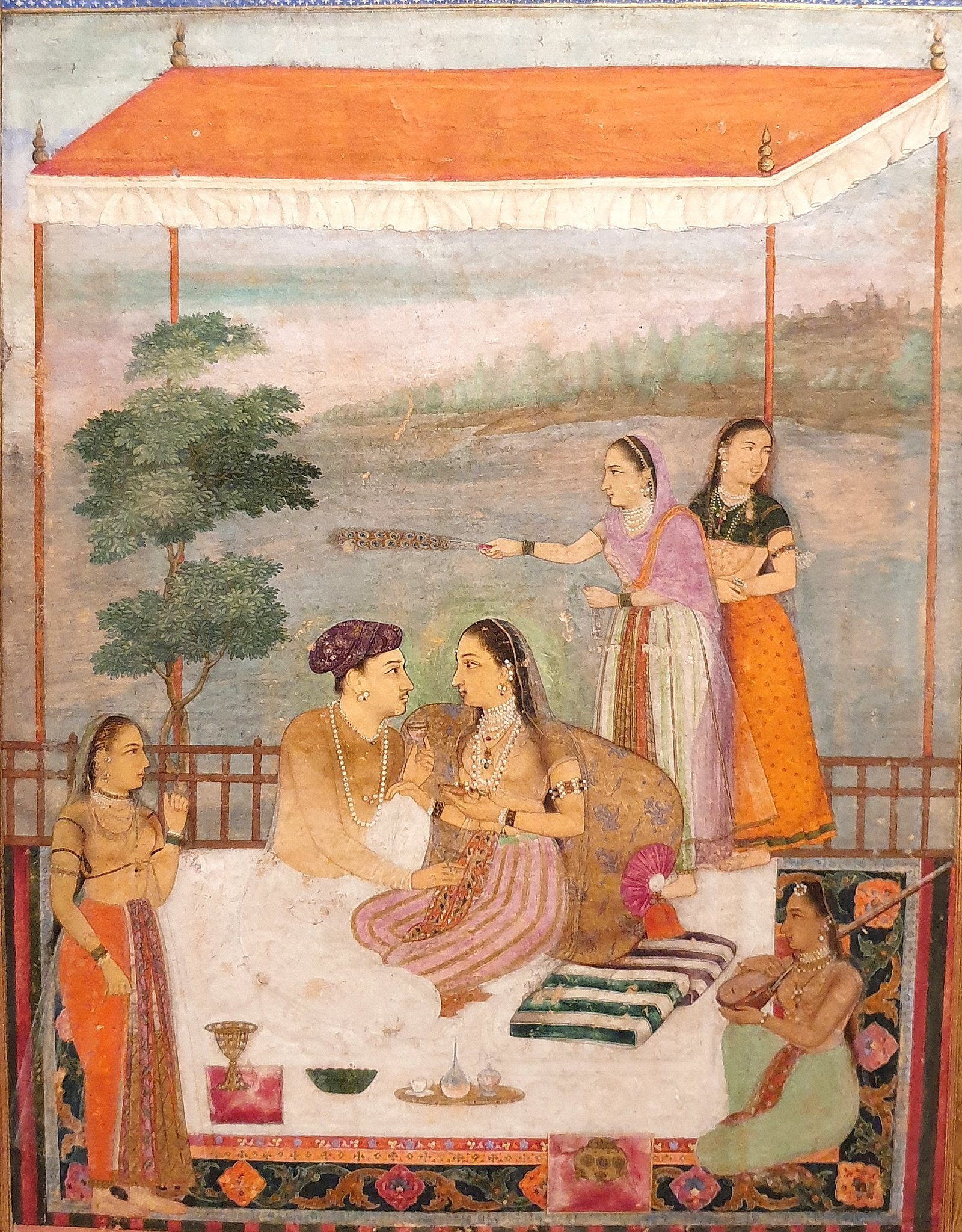
Wedding portrait of Shah Shuja and his wife, Belqis Banu Begum, daughter of Rustam Mirza

Due to advancing age and gout, Rustam Mirza withdrew from administrative duties and settled at the Mughal court in Agra, where Shah Jahan granted him an annual pension of one lakh and twenty thousand rupees. In 1632, Shah Jahan's son, Shah Shuja, married Rustam's daughter, Belqis Banu Begum, an event commemorated by the chronogram: Mahd Belqis ba sar manzil Jamshed amad (The lady Bilqis—Queen of Sheba—came to the house of Jamshid). According to Amal-i Salih by Muhammad Saleh Kamboh, the wedding adhered to traditional customs, including the application of henna, the distribution of brocaded robes, and trays adorned with flowers, betel leaves, sweets, and perfumes, all conducted with "utmost propriety". Shah Nawaz Khan notes that another of Rustam's daughters married Dara Shikoh.

Rustam Mirza died in Agra in 1642 at the age of 72. Following his death, when Agra's mustasaddis (tax collectors) attempted to seize his possessions, his widow armed the household's maidservants with muskets, disguising them as men, and declared that her family would not be treated like ordinary officials. Upon learning of her defiance, Shah Jahan, impressed by her resolve, allowed Rustam's family to retain all his belongings except his elephants.

== Marriage and issue ==
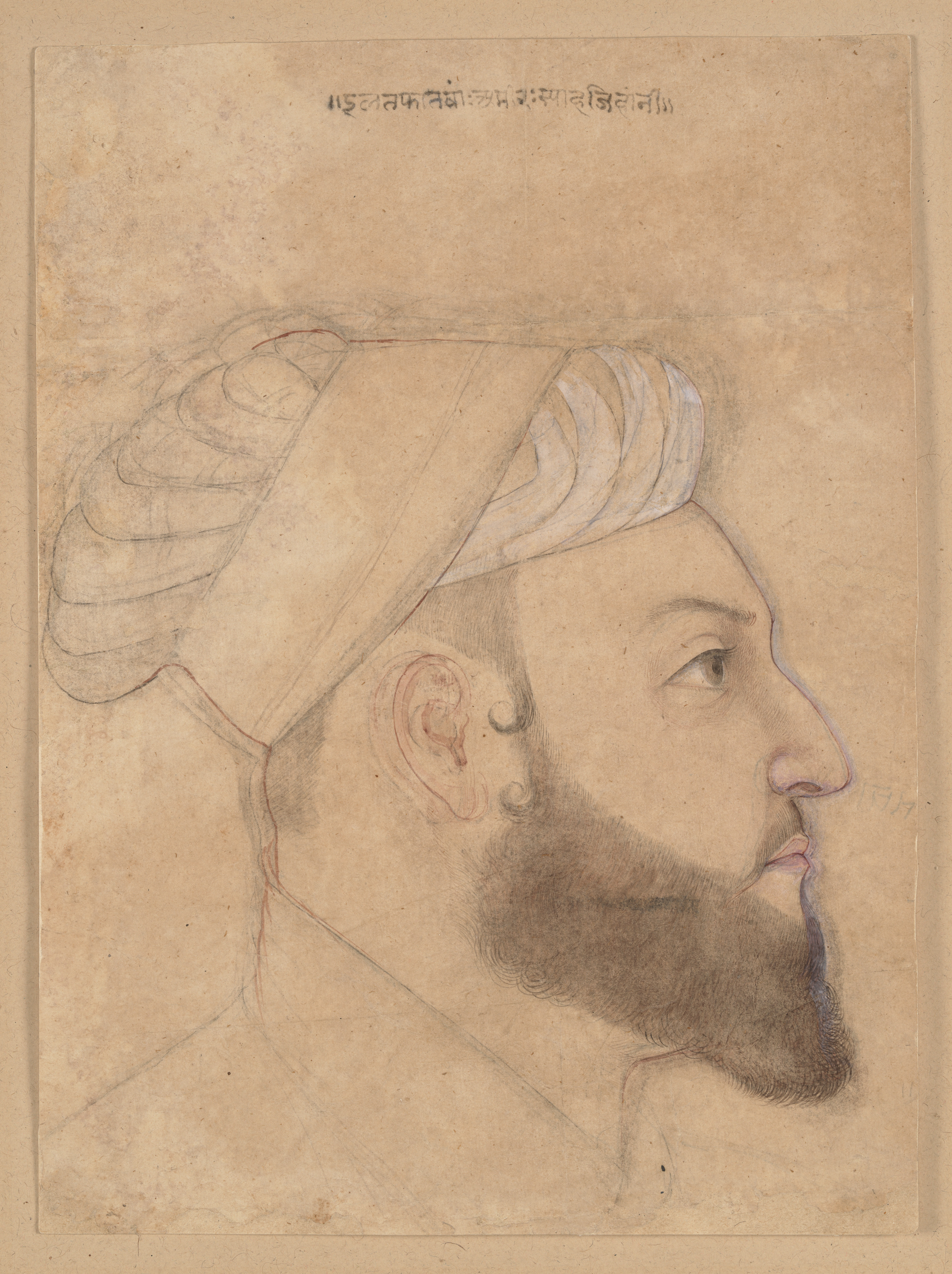
Head of the courtier Iltifat Khan. A life-size study of Sultan Murad Mirza Iltifat Khan, son of Rustam Mirza Safavi. c. 1640, Ashmolean Museum

In 1581, at the age of sixteen, Rustam Mirza married a noblewoman from the prominent Sheykhavand family, with the support of his regent, Kur Hamza Beg. According to Kholasat al-tavarikh by Ahmad Monshi Ghomi, the wedding was a grand affair, attended by numerous prominent nobles and royal princes, with lavish celebrations extending over six months. Ghomi attests that following the wedding night, Rustam suffered a brief period of illness and temporary blindness, from which he subsequently recovered.

According to Tuhfah al-kiram by Mir Ali Shir Qani Tattawi, Rustam had six sons: Murad, Shahrukh, Hasan, Ibrahim, Badi-uz-Zaman, and Mirza Masti; along with four daughters. However, Shahnawaz Khan and Muhammad Saleh Kamboh state that upon entering Mughal service in 1593, Rustam had only four sons, excluding Badi-uz-Zaman and Mirza Masti. Jahangir's records identify Sohrab Mirza as one of Rustam's sons, noting his death by drowning in a Kashmir river, which aligns with Tattawi's account of Mirza Masti's death, suggesting they were the same individual. Thus, Badi-uz-Zaman and Sohrab/Mirza Masti were likely born in India after 1593.

Having outlived his brothers—Abu Sa'id (d. 1596), Sanjar (d. 1597), and Mozaffar-Hosayn (d. 1600)—Rustam emerged as the undisputed head of the Bahrami-Safavid family within the Mughal Empire. In this role, he took on the care of his brothers' descendants, treating them as his own children. For instance, Jahangir's records note that Rustam welcomed Mozaffar-Hosayn's children into his household in Thatta, providing for them alongside his own offspring, despite the prior rivalry and tensions between the two brothers.

== Legacy ==
=== Historical assessment and anecdotes ===
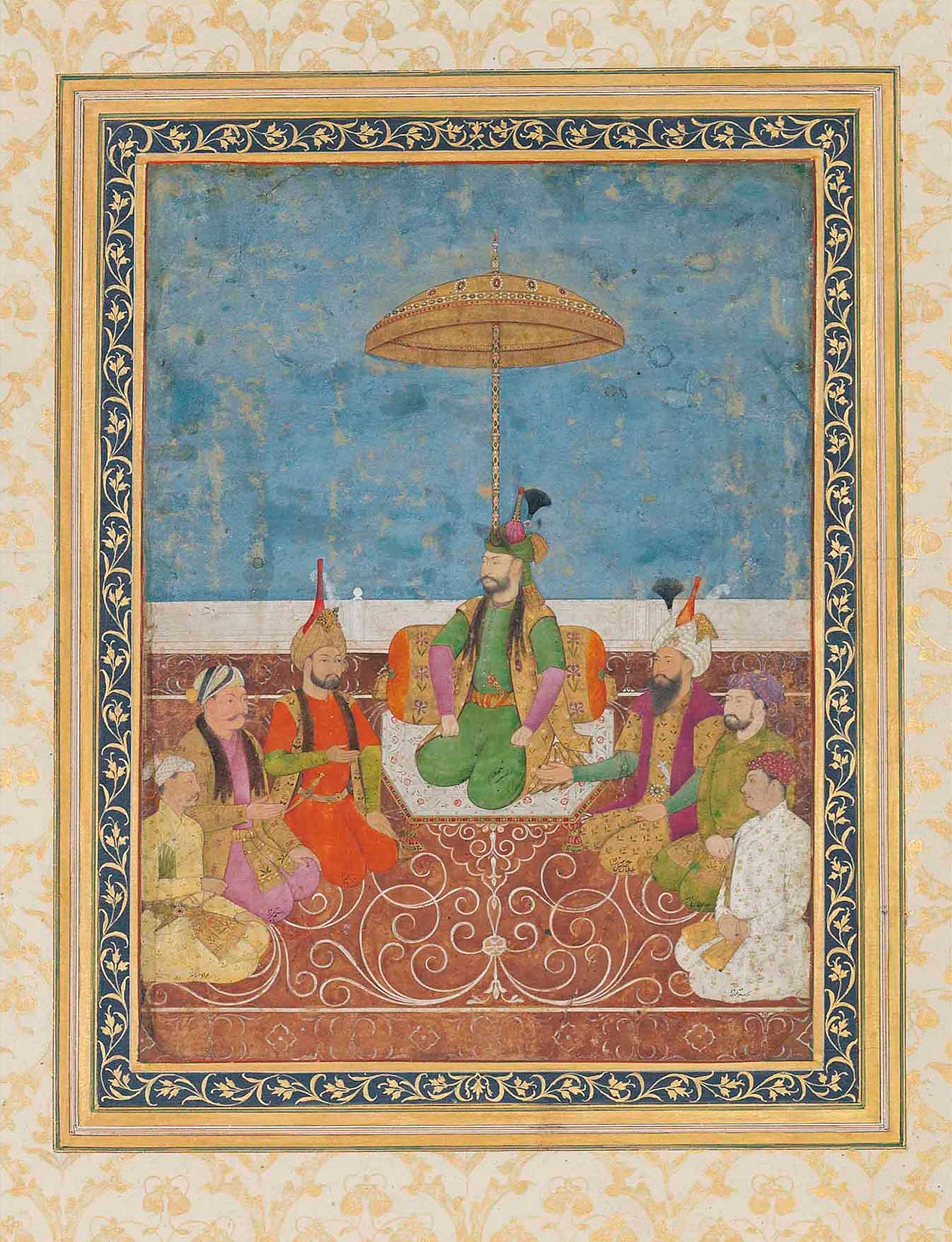
Shah Ismail Safavi and Six of His Descendants. Calligraphy signed by Shah Qasim. Mughal India, c. 1650 – c. 60. Clockwise from the left, Mirza Mukarram Khan (Rustam's grandson, died 1669), Rustam Mirza, Bahram Mirza (died 1550, son of Ismail I), Ismail I (center), Soltan Hosayn Mirza (son of Bahram Mirza, Rustam's father), Sultan Murad Mirza (Rustam's son, titled 'Iltafat Khan' under Jahangir), and Rustam Mirza (son of Mukarram). Now in the Museum of Islamic Art, Qatar. (Note: This painting once belonged to a Mughal emperor, but its exact purpose remains unclear. Islamic art scholar Nur Sobers-Khan suggests that owning a portrait of a rival dynasty may have been a significant achievement for the Mughals. There exists many illustrations of Timur in the company of his descendants, the Mughal emperors (for example, a piece from Padshahnama where Timur offers a crown to Shah Jahan), and this certain genre has been applied in this painting to the Safavid founder and his descendants from the Bahram line.)

The Ma'asir al-umara lauds Rustam Mirza as a sophisticated and worldly figure, while Abul Fazl's Ain-i-Akbari describes him as possessing greater intellect and ingenuity than his brother, Mozaffar-Hosayn Mirza. Asad Beg Qazvini, who spent time with Rustam during the celebrations marking Emperor Jahangir's accession in 1605, portrayed him as a refined individual with a deep appreciation for music, noting his expertise in various instruments and his engaging discussions with musicians, about their styles and characteristics; Rustam himself was a skilled player of the qanun. Additionally, Rustam was a prominent patron of Persian poets, including Mahwi Ardabili and Monsef Samarqandi, who accompanied him to Burhanpur and, through his support, gained patronage from other notable figures. Under the takhallus (pen name) Fadai, Rustam also composed poetry, including a humorous poem about his brother Mozaffar upon the latter's arrival at the Mughal court. (Note: English text of the verses: The blind man, who is being trodden on along the road of envy, I won't style him an impostor, for he is the donkey of impostors. It is said, cold wind comes from Iran, This wind at the time of reception is, however, a simoom.)

Asad Beg Qazvini further highlights Rustam Mirza's equitable treatment of his subordinates, noting that many held their own jagirs. A significant number of Rustam's original retinue, who accompanied him from the Safavid Iran to the Mughal court, secured prominent positions within the Mughal administration. These included relatives of Suleiman Khalifa, the former governor of Mashhad, Aliqoli Sultan Asayesh-Oghlu, a commander at the Battle of Azghand, and Muhammad Zaman Sultan Shamlu, previously the castellan of Bost. On the contrary, in 1622, Khalil Beg Dhulkadir, another member of his original entourage who had risen in Mughal service, was denounced by Rustam and executed alongside Mohtaram Khan Khaje Sara and Qadai Khan Mir Tuzak as conspirators in Prince Khurram's rebellion, by the orders of Jahangir, who was very trusting of Rustam. Jahangir's deep trust in Rustam is evidenced by the consistent elevation of his mansab, which indicates his near-constant presence within the imperial entourage and his favoured status at court.

Rustam Mirza distinguished himself as a skilled warlord, particularly adept in cavalry tactics. He was also a pioneer in introducing wheellock firearms to the Indian subcontinent; a passage from a Jahangirnama manuscript held by the Royal Asiatic Society recounts Rustam's fascination with a technologically advanced tufang (firearm) which he sought to acquire due to its remarkable features: the ability to fire 100 shots without overheating, a self-ignition mechanism, exceptional accuracy, and the capacity to handle a five-mithqal shot. Rustam offered 12,000 rupees and ten horses for the weapon, but the owner declined. Ultimately, Jahangir obtained the firearm and presented it to Rustam as a gift.

As a ruler, Rustam Mirza was frequently characterised in contemporary chronicles as tyrannical, notably in Yousuf Mirak's Tarikh Mazhar-i-Shahjahani, which provides firsthand accounts of his oppressive rule and the pervasive corruption within the land grant system during his tenure as subahdar of Thatta in Sindh. In contrast, Emperor Akbar commended Rustam's restraint in a letter, citing an incident during a hunt where, despite being wounded by a Rajput's sword, Rustam resolved the dispute diplomatically by sending the aggressor to the court for judgment.

=== Impact on Safavid-Mughal relations ===
Today, in the year 1616-17, Rustam Mirza, his sons, and the sons of Mozzafar-Hosayn Mirza, with several of their children, both male and female, are still in India, but at this point their history ceases to be relevant to the history of Iran.

— Tarikh-e Alam-ara-ye Abbasi, Iskandar Beg Munshi

The Safavid chronicler Iskandar Beg Munshi, writing under Shah Abbas I, consistently downplayed Rustam Mirza Safavi's significance, depicting him as a marginal figure in Safavid-Mughal relations and irrelevant to Iranian politics following his defeats in the 1590s. In contrast, Emperor Akbar leveraged Rustam's presence at the Mughal court to facilitate the acquisition of Qandahar in 1595. Akbar's strategy included fostering a pro-Rustam uprising or encouraging Mozaffar-Hosayn Mirza's voluntary surrender by showcasing generosity toward Rustam. Mughal records, as noted by historian Marc Morató-Aragonés Ibáñez, framed the intervention as a defense of the Bahrami-Safavid governance in Qandahar while also citing punitive actions against Baluchi raiders who allegedly attacked Thatta and retreated eastward. Facing a precarious position, Abbas I pursued diplomacy, sending gifts and envoys to the Mughal court to negotiate Qandahar's return. Akbar, while affirming amicable relations, justified retaining Qandahar by claiming to protect Rustam's regional authority, refusing to relinquish the city.

Post-annexation, the grand vizier Abu'l Fazl defended the intervention, asserting that Safavid princes, including Rustam, sought refuge with Akbar due to Abbas' failure to support them against Uzbek incursions. Years later, Emperor Jahangir referenced a purported letter from "the princes", in which Rustam allegedly expressed his inability to govern Qandahar and offered to cede it to a Mughal representative in exchange for the opportunity to pay homage, presenting the Bahrami-Safavids as the legitimate rulers who willingly transferred the region to Akbar.

Rustam's lingering support in Khorasan and Qandahar positioned him as a potential claimant to the Safavid throne, a status the Mughals exploited as a deterrent against Safavid ambitions. Notably, during the 1606 Safavid siege of Qandahar, Jahangir invoked Rustam's claim to dissuade Abbas's forces, who, in a subsequent letter, disavowed the siege as unauthorised. Ibáñez suggests three occasions when the Mughals could have pursued an invasion of Iran to install Rustam: in 1595 during Qandahar's acquisition, in 1612–1615 during Rustam's governance of Thatta, and in 1622 amid the Mughal-Safavid conflict over Qandahar, ultimately won by the Safavids. However, prioritising regional stability, the Mughals refrained from advancing Rustam's claim, opting instead to maintain diplomatic equilibrium.

== Bibliography ==
=== Primary sources ===
- Munshi, Iskandar Beg (1978) [1629]. Tarikh-e Alam-ara-ye Abbasi [History of Shah 'Abbas the Great]. Persian Heritage Series. Vol. 1. Translated by Roger M., Savory. Boulder, Colorado: Westview Press. ISBN 9780891582960. OCLC 659933391.

=== Secondary sources ===
- Afshar, Hamideh Malekpour; Sarafrazi, Abbas (2018). "نقش شاهزادگان صفوی در دربار مغولان هند" [Role of Safavid Princes in the court of Indian Mugals]. Journal of Subcontinent Researches (in Persian). 10 (35). Zahedan: University of Sistan and Baluchestan: 78–99. ISSN 2538-5062. OCLC 1430190247.
- Askari, Syed Hasan (1944). "Bihar in the Time of Shahjahan". Proceedings of the Indian History Congress. 7. Indian History Congress: 348–359. OCLC 1179373062.
- Ahmad, Imtiaz (2002). "Mughal Governors of Bihar Under Akbar and Jahangir". Proceedings of the Indian History Congress. 63. Indian History Congress: 281–288. OCLC 1179373062.
- Ahmad, Aziz (1976). "Ṣafawid Poets and India". Iran. 14. Taylor & Francis: 117–132. doi:10.2307/4300548.
- Anwar, Firdos (1991). "Implementation of Escheat Under Shah Jahan: Some Implications". Proceedings of the Indian History Congress. 52. Indian History Congress: 266–273. OCLC 1179373062.
- Beach, Milo Cleveland (1980). "The Mughal Painter Abu'l Hasan and Some English Sources for His Style". The Journal of the Walters Art Gallery. 38. Baltimore: Trustees of the Walters Art Gallery: 6–33. ISSN 2328-3831. JSTOR 20168968. OCLC 244293425.
- Blow, David (2009). Shah Abbas: The Ruthless King Who Became an Iranian Legend. London: I. B. Tauris. ISBN 978-1-84511-989-8. LCCN 2009464064.
- Burton, Audrey (1995). "The War of Words between ʿAbd al-Muʾmin and Shāh ʿAbbās". Central Asiatic Journal. 39 (1). Wiesbaden: Harrassowitz Verlag: 51–77. ISSN 0008-9192. OCLC 559589888.
- Charak, Sukh Dev Singh (1971). Maharaja Ranjitdev and the Rise and Fall of Jammu Kingdom, from 1700 A.D. to 1820 A.D. Pathankot: Dogra-Pahari Itihas Kendra. LCCN 73907514. OCLC 1205889.
- Crill, Rosemary; Jariwala, Kapil (2010). The Indian Portrait, 1560–1860. London: National Portrait Gallery Publications. ISBN 9781855144095. OCLC 436243276.
- Dasti, Humaira Faiz (1998). Multan, a Province of the Mughal Empire, 1525-1751. Karachi: Royal Book. ISBN 9789694072265. OCLC 41452400.
- Davidson, Olga M. (1985). "The Crown-Bestower in the Iranian Book of Kings". In Bailey, Harold Walter (ed.). Papers in Honour of Professor Mary Boyce. Vol. 1. Leiden: Brill. pp. 61–148. ISBN 9789068310023. OCLC 489679254.
- Faruqui, Munis D. (2012). The Princes of the Mughal Empire, 1504-1719. Cambridge: Cambridge University Press. doi:10.1017/CBO9781139135474. ISBN 9781139135474. OCLC 939844650.
- Ghaffari Fard, Abbas Gholi (1997). روابط صفویه و ازبکان (913–1031 ه. ق) [Safavid and Uzbek Relations (913-1031 H.G)] (in Persian). Tehran: Ministry of Foreign Affairs, Printing and Publishing Institute. ISBN 9789646056534. OCLC 39632517.
- Geevers, Liesbeth (2015). "Safavid Cousins on the Verge of Extinction: Dynastic Centralization in Central Asia and the Bahrāmī Collateral Line (1517-1593)". Journal of the Economic and Social History of the Orient. 58 (3). Leiden: Brill: 293–326. doi:10.1163/15685209-12341376. ISSN 1568-5209. JSTOR 43919246. OCLC 46849781.
- Hejazi, Banafsheh (2002). ضعیفه: بررسی جایگاه زن ایرانی در عصر صفوی [The Weak Sex: A Study Concerning the Place of Iranian Woman in the Age of the Safavids] (in Persian). Tehran: Qasideh-sara. ISBN 9789649376912. OCLC 1311582538.
- Husain, Afzal (1999). The Nobility Under Akbar and Jahāngīr : A Study of Family Groups. New Delhi: Manohar Publisher and Distributors. ISBN 9788173043178.
- Ibáñez, Marc Morató-Aragonés (2024). "Welcoming the Future Safavid Sovereign: The Significance of Rustam Mirza's Exodus to the Mughal Empire (1593)". The Court Historian. 29 (1). London: The Society for Court Studies: 33–49. doi:10.1080/14629712.2024.2321783. ISSN 1462-9712. OCLC 43272438.
- Jahan Tab, Afsaneh (2001). "منصف سمرقندی" [Monsef Samarqandi]. دانشنامه ادب فارسى [Encyclopedia of Persian Literature] (in Persian). Vol. 3. Tehran: Muʼassasah-ʼi Farhangī va Intishārātī-i Dānishnāmah. ISBN 9789644220487. OCLC 50110998.
- Jeratha, Aśoka (2000). Forts and Palaces of the Western Himalaya. New Delhi: Indus Publishing Company. ISBN 9788173871047. OCLC 995163710.
- Joshi, P. M. (1968). "Asad Beg's Return From Bijapur and His Second Mission to the Deccan, 1604-1606". In Rao, V. D. (ed.). Studies in Indian History; Dr. A.G. Pawar Felicitation Volume. Bombay: Popular Prakashan. pp. 136–155. OCLC 47666.
- Karakaya-Stump, Ayfer (2021). "Who Really Were the Kizilbash? A Rethinking of the Kizilbash Movement in Light of New Sources and Research". In Matthee, Rudi (ed.). The Safavid World. New York: Taylor & Francis. pp. 37–56. ISBN 9781000392876. OCLC 1274244049.
- Khan, Mohammad Afzal (1998). Abbasi, Shahid Ali (ed.). "Safavis in Mughal Service: the Mirzas of Qandahar". Islamic Culture. 72 (1). Academic and Cultural Publications Charitable Trust: 59–81. ISSN 0021-1834. OCLC 880469373.
- Khan, Mohammad Afzal (1981). "The Ma'muris—An Unexplored Clan in the Mughal Nobility". Proceedings of the Indian History Congress. 42. New Delhi: Indian History Congress: 203–213. OCLC 880469373.
- Khan, Iqtidar Alam (1991). "The Nature of Handguns in Mughal India: 16th and 17th Centuries". Proceedings of the Indian History Congress. 52. New Delhi: Indian History Congress: 378–389. OCLC 880469373.
- Maeda, Hirotake (2021). "Against all odds: the Safavids and the Georgians". In Matthee, Rudi (ed.). The Safavid World. New York: Taylor & Francis. pp. 125–144. ISBN 9781000392876. OCLC 1274244049.
- Mansoori Mughadam, Mohamad; Gholizadeh, Mohammad Reza; Elahi, Mojtaba (2022). "اهمیت استراتژیک قندهار و تأثیر آن بر روابط صفویان با گورکانیان هند (دوره سلطنت شاه‌ عباس اول)" [Qandahar Strategic Position and Its Impact on Safavid-Indian Gurkanis (Reign of Shah Abbas I)]. Quarterly of Foreign Relations History (in Persian). 23 (89). Tehran: Department for Historical Studies and Oral History of the Foreign Ministry: 121–138. ISSN 1735-2010.
- Mitchell, Colin Paul (2006). "Timurids". In Josef W. Meri (ed.). Medieval Islamic Civilization: An Encyclopedia. Vol. 2, L–Z, index. New York: Taylor & Francis. p. 814. ISBN 978-0-415-96692-4. OCLC 59360024.
- Mir Jafari, Hossein (1977). "سیستان در عصر صفویه" [Sistan During the Age of Safavids]. Historical Research (in Persian). 12 (4). Tehran: Sitād-i Buzurg-i Artishtārān: 49–76. ISSN 1010-2825. OCLC 1519175.
- Morimoto, Kazuo (2010). "The Earliest ʿAlid Genealogy for the Safavids: New Evidence for the Pre-dynastic Claim to Sayyid Status". Iranian Studies. 43 (4). Cambridge University Press: 447–469. doi:10.1080/00210862.2010.495561. ISSN 0021-0862. JSTOR 23033219.
- Naz, Humera (2020). "Sindh under the Mughals: Some Glimpses from Tarikh-i-Masumi and Mazhar-i-Shahjahaniitle". Pakistan Perspectives. 24 (2). Karachi: University of Karachi: 11–23. doi:10.2139/ssrn.3652107.
- Paliwal, Amita (2000). "The Transition of Sindh to a Mughal Province-The Ghazi Beg Interlude, 1601-1612". Proceedings of the Indian History Congress. 61. New Delhi: Indian History Congress: 303–307. JSTOR 44148106.
- Potts, Daniel T. (2014). Nomadism in Iran : From Antiquity to the Modern Era. New York: Oxford University Press. ISBN 9780190600594. OCLC 927363758.
- Savory, Roger (2013). "Ebn Bazzāz". In Yarshater, Ehsan (ed.). Encyclopædia Iranica (Online ed.). Encyclopædia Iranica Foundation.
- Seyed Yazdi, Zahra; Bajlan, Jafar (March 2016). "شاه اسماعیل صفوی و شاهنامه صفوی" [Shah Ismail and Shahnameh in the Age of the Safavids]. Journal of Iranian Studies. 15 (30). Kerman: Shahid Bahonar University of Kerman: 101–116. ISSN 2980-8766. OCLC 1430478841.
- Singh, Nagendra Kr. (2001). "Rustam Safavi, Mirza (d. 1641-42)". Encyclopaedia of Muslim biography : India, Pakistan, Bangladesh. Vol. 4. Muh-R. New Delhi: APH Publishing Corporation. pp. 545–548. ISBN 9788176482301. OCLC 47174928.
- Sinha, Surendra Nath (1974). Subah of Allahabad under the great Mughals, 1580-1707. New Delhi: Jamia Millia Islamia. LCCN 74903761. OCLC 2387730.
- Sobers-Khan, Nur (2014). Building Our Collection: Mughal and Safavid Albums (in Arabic). Doha: Museum of Islamic Art. OCLC 1131782670.
- Soudavar, Abolala (1992). Art of the Persian Courts : Selections from the Art and History Trust Collection. New York: Rizzoli. ISBN 9780847816606. OCLC 26396207.
- Soudavar, Abolala (1999). "Between the Safavids and the Mughals: Art and Artists in Transition". Iran. London: Taylor & Francis, Ltd.: 49–66. doi:10.2307/4299994. ISSN 0578-6967. OCLC 5543699868.
