= Iltifat Khan =

Mughal nobleman

- Sultan
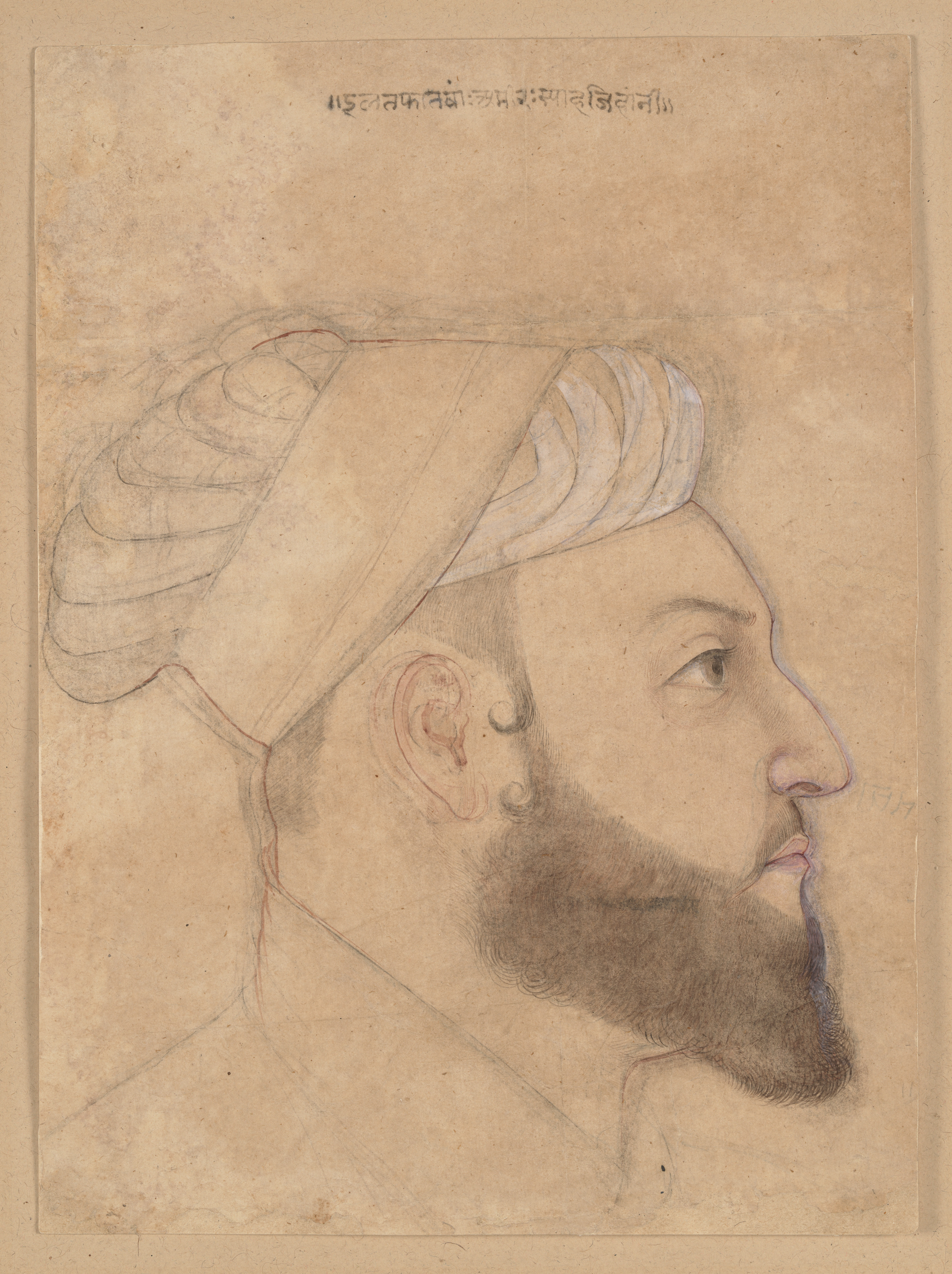
- Study of Iltifat Khan, c. 1640, anonymous, Metropolitan Museum of Art. (Note: The drawing was probably made in preparations for a larger durbar scene in which the subject would be standing in a court assembly looking upward at the emperor (as suggested by his raised gaze.) A Devanagari inscription above identifies the subject and indicates that the drawing was in a Rajput collection for some time in history.)
- Born: Murad Mirza
- Dynasty: Safavid
- Father: Rustam Mirza Safavi

Murad Khan, also Sultan Murad Mirza Iltifat Khan and Mirza Mukarram Khan Safavi, often simply Iltifat Khan, was a son of Rustam Mirza Safavi, a noble of Safavid ancestry at the court of the Mughal Empire. Rustam Mirza Safavi, at the age of sixteen, had married a noblewoman from the prominent Sheykhavand family in 1581.

Murad Khan received the title of "Iltifat Khan" from the Mughal Emperor Jahangir. He then received the title of "Mukarram Khan" in the 27th year of the reign of Shah Jahan, circa 1655. Iltifat Khan is said to have been well-connected at the Mughal court, through his marriage and the marriages of his daughters. He married the daughter of the Mughal notable 'Abdur-Rahim Khan-i Khanan.

His fine, realistic, portrait in the Metropolitan Museum of Art is the result of Akbar's insistence on the creation of life-like depictions, in contradiction with the precepts of religious orthodoxy.

Iltifat Khan took really retirement and died in Patna in 1657, or in 1669.

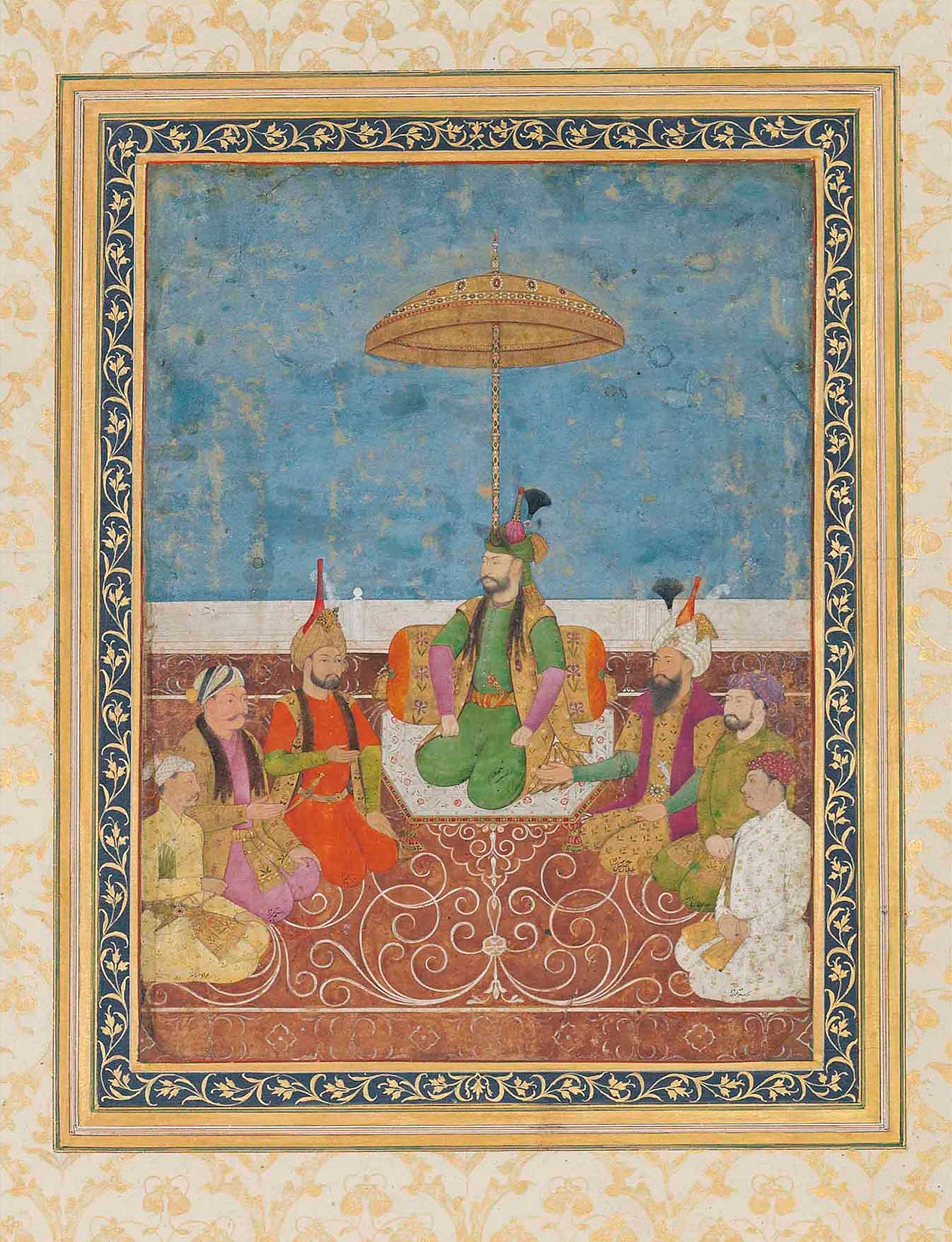
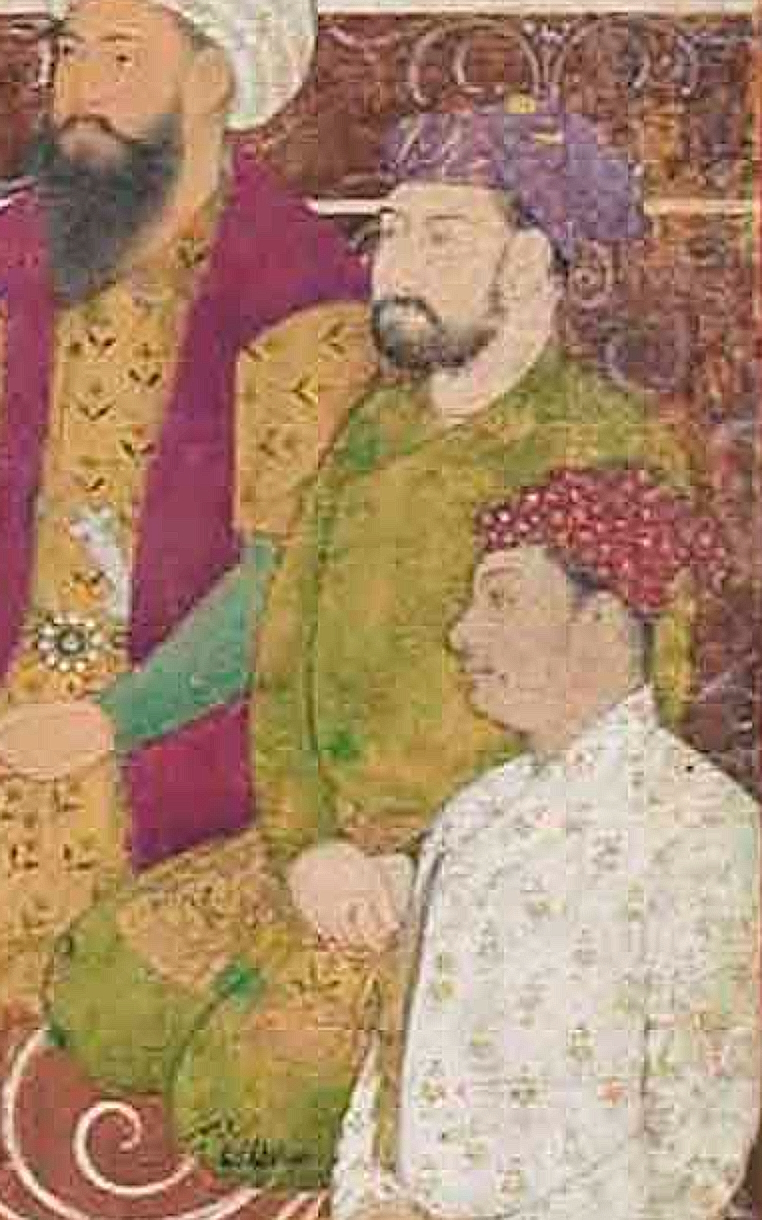
Another portrait of Iltafat Khan, in Shah Ismail Safavi and Six of His Descendants. Calligraphy signed Shah Qasim. Mughal India, circa 1650-60

== Bibliography ==
- Crill, Rosemary; Jariwala, Kapil (2010). The Indian Portrait, 1560-1860. Mapin Publishing Pvt Ltd. ISBN 978-81-89995-37-9.
- Guy, John; Haidar, Navina Najat (2024). Indian Skies: The Howard Hodgkin Collection of Indian Court Painting. New York: The Metropolitan Museum of Art. OCLC 1427175369.
- Hejazi, Banafsheh (2002). ضعیفه: بررسی جایگاه زن ایرانی در عصر صفوی [The Weak Sex: A Study Concerning the Place of Iranian Woman in the Age of the Safavids] (in Persian). Tehran: Qasideh-sara. ISBN 9789649376912. OCLC 1311582538.
