= Asma Afsaruddin =

American scholar of Islamic studies

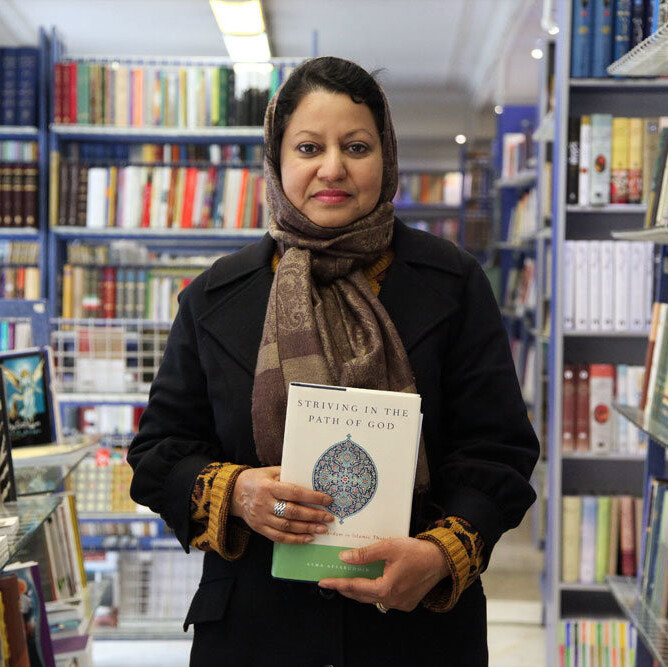
- Asma Afsaruddin in 2015
- Born: Asma Afsaruddin; 1958 (age 67–68)

Academic background
- Education: Johns Hopkins University

Academic work
- Institutions: Indiana University
- Notable works: Striving in the Path of God: Jihad and Martyrdom in Islamic Thought; The First Muslims: History and Memory

Asma Afsaruddin (born 1958) is an American scholar of Islamic studies and professor in the Department of Near Eastern Languages and Cultures at Indiana University in Bloomington.

== Biography ==
Afsaruddin was an associate professor in Arabic and Islamic studies at the University of Notre Dame, Indiana. She previously taught at Harvard University and Johns Hopkins University, from which she received her PhD in 1993. Her fields of specialization include the religious and political thought of Islam, study of the primary Islamic texts (Qur'an and hadith), as well as gender studies.

Afsaruddin has been an editorial board member for the bulletin of the Middle East Studies Association, published by Cambridge University Press. She was an editor of the Routledge Encyclopedia of Medieval Islamic Civilization and a consultant for The Oxford Dictionary of Islam (2002).

Afsaruddin chairs the Center for the Study of Islam and Democracy board of directors. She also sits on advisory committees for the Muslim World Initiative of the United States Institute of Peace and the human rights organization Karamah.

== Awards and honours ==
In 2015, she was presented the Jayezeh Jahani (World Book Prize) for the best new book in Islamic studies by the Iranian president Hassan Rouhani for her book Striving in the Path of God: Jihad and Martyrdom in Islamic Thought. The book was also a runner-up for the British-Kuwaiti Friendship Society Book Prize in 2014.

== Publications ==
- Jihad: What Everyone Needs to Know (Oxford University Press, 2022)
- Contemporary Issues in Islam (Edinburgh University Press, 2015)
- Striving in the Path of God: Jihad and Martyrdom in Islamic Thought (Oxford University Press, 2013)
- The First Muslims: History and Memory (Oxford: Oneworld Publications, 2008)
- Excellence and Precedence: Medieval Islamic Discourse on Legitimate Leadership (Leiden: E.J. Brill, 2002)
- Hermeneutics and Honor: Negotiation of Female "Public" Space in Islamic/ate Societies (Cambridge, Mass.: Harvard University, 1999)
- Culture, and Language in the Near East : Essays in Honor of Georg Krotkoff (Eisenbrauns: Winona Lake, Ind., 1997)
