= Jihad: What Everyone Needs to Know =

Book about jihad by Asma Afsaruddin

- Cover
- Author: Asma Afsaruddin
- Language: English
- Series: What Everyone Needs to Know
- Subject: Jihad, Islamic thought, contemporary issues in Islam
- Genre: Non-fiction
- Publisher: Oxford University Press
- Publication date: March 3, 2022
- Publication place: United States
- Media type: Print, digital
- Pages: 220
- ISBN: 9780190647315
- Preceded by: Contemporary Issues in Islam (2015)
- Followed by: The Oxford Handbook of Islam and Women (2023)

Jihad: What Everyone Needs to Know is a book by American Islamic studies scholar and author Asma Afsaruddin. It was published in 2022 by Oxford University Press and is part of its What Everyone Needs to Know series. The book studies the concept of jihad, contrasting popular, often violent representations of the term with its broader meaning within Islamic tradition. Afsaruddin delves into the scriptural, theological, moral, ethical, legal, and socio-political dimensions of jihad, offering readers a historically grounded understanding of its significance. In 2024, a Polish version was published by Wydawnictwo Naukowe PWN.

== Summary ==
The book is a scholarly exploration of the complex and often misunderstood concept of jihad in Islamic tradition. Presented in a question-and-answer format, answering 90 major questions concerning jihad, the book seeks to provide a nuanced understanding of jihad through historical, theological, legal, and ethical lenses and dispel common misconceptions.

Divided into eight chapters, the book begins by examining jihad in the Quran, covering both its militant and non-militant interpretations, and continues with a discussion of jihad in the hadith literature, focusing in part on the distinction between the "greater" (in Arabic: الجهاد الأكبر) and "lesser" (in Arabic: الجهاد الأصغر) jihads.

The third chapter delves into Islamic legal traditions that regulate warfare, emphasizing the moral principles of protecting noncombatants and limiting violence, akin to Western "just war" theories.

Afsaruddin also explores the spiritual and ethical dimensions of jihad, portraying it as a form of moral and spiritual perseverance. The book then transitions to modern times, examining how jihad has been reinterpreted by revolutionaries and militants, as well as mainstream Islamic scholars, some of whom advocate for non-violent interpretations. Afsaruddin also addresses the portrayal of jihad as non-violent struggle and peacemaking in contemporary discourse.

The final chapter discusses how military jihad is perceived in the West, often conflated with "holy war," and compares it with modern international legal conceptions of just warfare which may have been influenced by Islamic law.

== Background ==
Afsaruddin, a Professor of Middle Eastern languages and cultures and Class of 1950 Herman B Wells Endowed Professor at Indiana University, is a scholar in Islamic studies. Her work focuses on the concepts of jihad and martyrdom in Islam. The book is not her first published work about jihad. Her earlier work, Striving in the Path of God: Jihad and Martyrdom in Islamic Thought (2013), won the World Book Prize from Iran's Ministry of Culture and Islamic Guidance, awarded by President Hassan Rouhani. The work challenged exclusively militant interpretations of jihad by emphasizing its multifaceted meanings, drawn from multiple primary Arabic sources, that include social reform and personal spiritual struggle, and was praised for expanding the scholarly discourse beyond traditional legal perspectives. The book was also a runner-up for the British-Kuwait Friendship Society Book Prize (2014).

== Reception ==
Natana J. DeLong-Bas described the book as an excellent "one stop shop" for everything to know about jihad. DeLong-Bas praised the book for offering a well-balanced and much-needed corrective to common misconceptions about jihad, especially those fueled by media and extremist interpretations. She said that Afsaruddin "courageously meets the militants on their own claimed territory" by addressing the complexities of jihad and dismantling violent interpretations with historical context and scholarly rigor. DeLong-Bas also commended the book for being accessible to a broad audience and for providing clear, evidence-based responses to difficult questions about jihad.

Historian of Islam, Mohammad Amin Mansouri said the book is valuable, accessible, and comprehensive. Mansouri thought that the book’s question-and-answer format helped not only dispel common misconceptions about jihad, but also demystify the complex concept of jihad for both general readers and scholars. He highlighted the breadth in covering both historical and contemporary interpretations of jihad, and praised the author's research on both its military and nonmilitant dimensions. While Mansouri appreciated the book’s depth and clarity, he noted that it primarily focused on Sunni perspectives and suggested that a more inclusive approach incorporating Shiʿi views would have further enriched the understanding of jihad.
