= Mirza Badi-uz-Zaman Safavi =

Badi-uz-Zaman Safavi
- Shahzada of the Safavid Empire
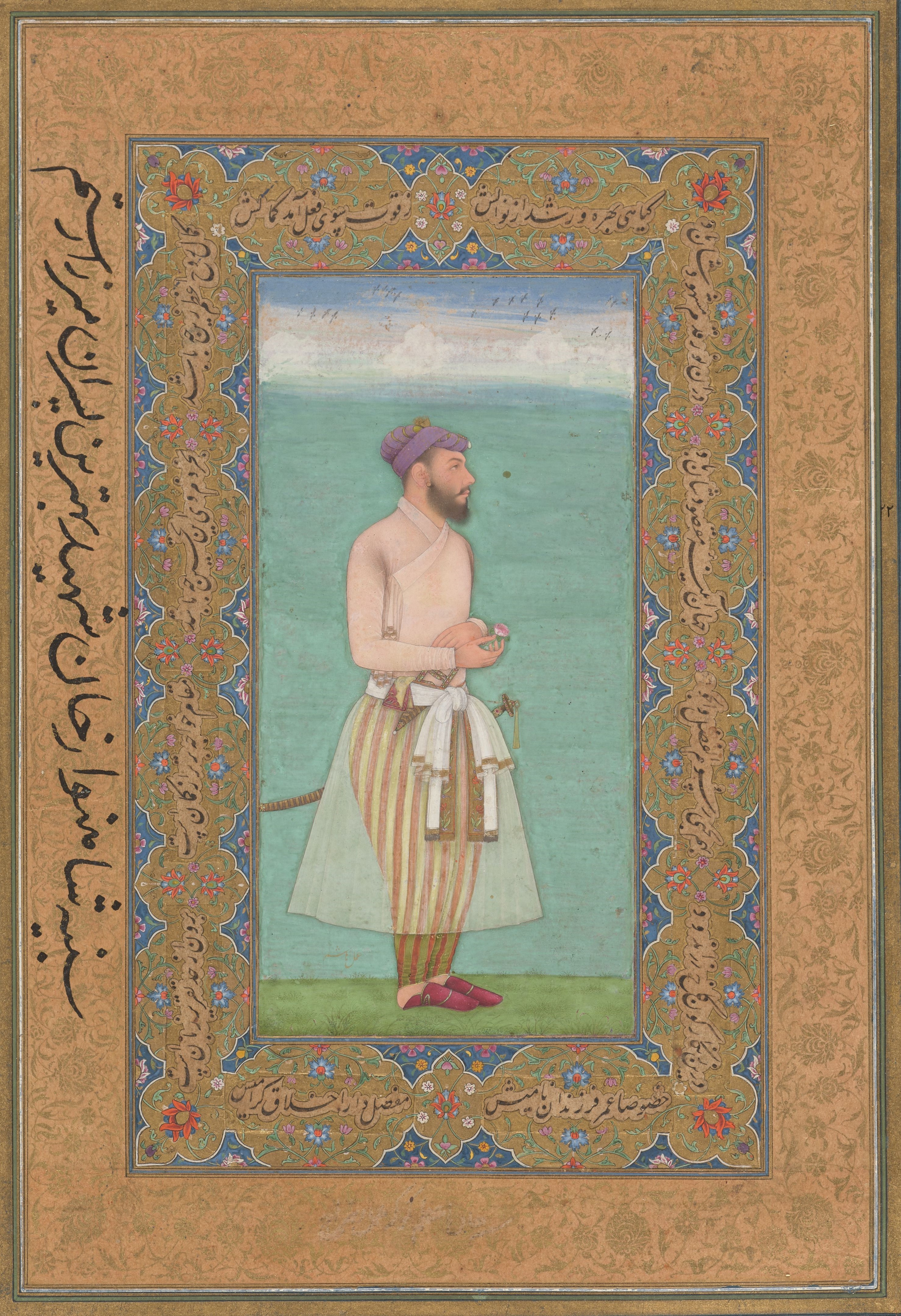
- Badi-uz-Zaman Safavid by Hashim

Subahdar of Gujarat
- Tenure: 1658 – 1659
- Emperor: Aurangzeb
- Predecessor: Murad Bakhsh
- Successor: Jaswant Singh
- Died: 14 March 1659; Ajmer, Rajasthan, India
- Burial: Ajmer Sharif, Ajmer
- Spouse: Nauras Banu Begum
- Issue: Dilras Banu Begum; Sakina Banu Begum; Mirza Muhammad Ahsan Safavi; Mirza Mu‘azzam Safavi Sahebe soltan khanom
- Badi-uz-Zaman Safavi
- Dynasty: Safavid
- Father: Rustam Mirza Safavi
- Religion: Shia Islam

Badi-uz-Zaman Safavi (Persian: بدیع‌الزمان صفوی; died 1659) was a prince of the Safavid dynasty of Persia and a powerful amir at the Mughal court during Emperor Shah Jahan's reign. He is better known by the title Shahnawaz Khan or Mirza Deccan. Shahnawaz Khan was the father-in-law of Mughal emperor Aurangzeb and his younger brother Prince Murad Baksh.

== Family and lineage ==
Shahnawaz Khan was the son of Rustam Mirza Safavi, who rose to eminence during Emperor Jahangir's reign. He belonged to the lineage of the old Mashad princes of Iran - his great-grandfather was a son of Shah Ismail I of the Safavid Empire.

He was married to Nauras Banu Begum, the daughter of Mirza Muhammad Sharif. The couple were the parents of two sons and five daughters, including Dilras Banu Begum, who married Prince Muhi-ud-din (later known as Aurangzeb upon his accession), the third son of Emperor Shah Jahan in 1637. Another daughter of his married Aurangzeb's youngest brother, Prince Murad Bakhsh in 1638.

== At the Mughal court ==
Shahnawaz Khan was made viceroy of Gujarat and ataliq to Shah Jahan's son, Prince Murad Baksh, at the time of his assignment to the Deccan. Shahnawaz Khan was imprisoned by his son-in-law, Aurangzeb, in the Burhanpur fort in 1658 for not supporting him in the war of succession. Khan, instead of supporting his son-in-law, chose to support Aurangzeb's oldest brother, Crown Prince Dara Shikoh, the heir-apparent chosen by Emperor Shah Jahan. This resulted in a conflict of interests between Aurangzeb and him. Aurangzeb released him seven months later, upon the intercession of his eldest daughter Princess Zeb-un-Nisa and appointed him the viceroy of Gujarat.

== Death ==
Shahnawaz Khan died in battle at Ajmer on 14 March 1659 and was buried in Ajmer Sharif, Rajasthan by the orders of Aurangzeb. French physician and traveller, François Bernier, records two different versions about the cause of his death: he was either killed by Dara Shikoh himself or by the members of Aurangzeb's army who were secretly Dara's supporters and feared that he might have some knowledge about the correspondence between them and him.

== See also ==
- Mir Jumla II
