= Princes of the House of Timur =

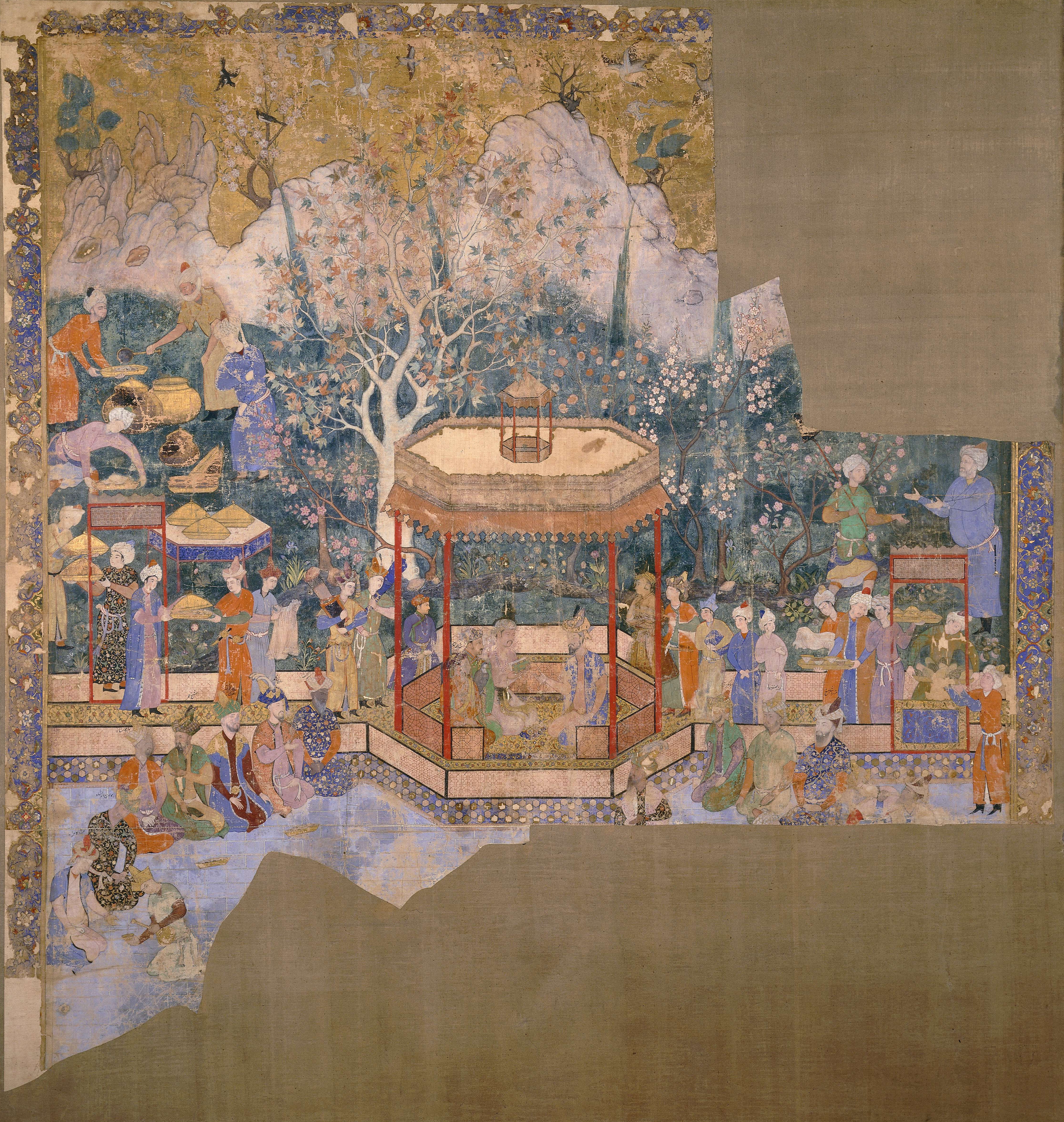
- Location: British Museum, London

Princes of the House of Timur is a painting located in the British Museum.

== History ==
The painting is generally dated to the reign of Humayun. In this view, upon his accession in 1605, Jahangir had the painting converted into a group portrait of the Timurid dynasty. He also had himself, his father and predecessor Akbar, and his two eldest sons Khusrau and Parviz, added to the painting. Upon succeeding to the throne in 1628, Shah Jahan had himself and his heir Dara Shikoh added.

Percy Brown ascribes the painting to the reign of Akbar (r. 1556-1605). He posits that Akbar and Humayun must have been the painting's original subjects, with the other figures added later, during the reigns of Jahangir and Shah Jahan.

== Iconography and interpretation ==
Scholars have interpreted the painting as an assertion of Timurid–Mughal dynastic continuity and legitimacy, expressed through the gathering of ancestors and descendants around Humayun in a formal garden setting. Each figure in the hierarchy is arranged so intricately around Humayun showing the painters intent of portraying dynastic hierarchy and legitimacy. This highlights the visual communication used by the Mughals to show political continuity and status. The Mughal charbagh garden has been interpreted as a symbol of paradise, political order, and dynastic unity. Showing that the Timurid–Mughal line makes it one of the most important documents of early Mughal political imagery.

== Identifications and inscriptions ==
Persian inscriptions identify each figure:

Standing to the left in the painting are Kamran Mirza, Babur Shah, Shaykh Omar, Sultan Abu Sa‘id, Sultan Muhammad, and Miran Shah.

On their robes and clothing are the names of artists and attendants, including “Bichitr” on Sultan Abu Sa‘id’s robe, “Govardhana” on Barbur’s, and “Dawlat,” “Mohan,” and “Nanha” on the robes of Shaykh Omar, Sultan Muhammad, and Miran Shah.

To the right of the pavilion stand Abu Bakr Mirza, Baisunghur Mirza, Khusrau Mirza, and Mirza Shah Rukh. Outside the pavilion and opposite stand Sultan Parviz and Shah Jahan with additional attendants labeled “Hiranand,” “Inayat,” and “Balchand.”

Humayun is seated in the center.

== Condition ==
Conservation and technical evidence reveal that the edges of the painting have been trimmed on all four sides, along with associated losses to the original border decoration and parts of the composition. The surface further exhibits abrasions, with small areas of pigment loss which was then subsequently retouched from restoration campaigns during examinations at the British Museum.However, despite the damages and alterations, this piece of work continues to be considered in the scholarship as a foundationally important early example of Mughal dynastic portraiture and political imagery, furthermore, encapsulating the adaption of Timurid illustrative models with the emerging imperial Mughal aesthetic and influencing subsequent developments in imperial pictorial production.

== Description ==
Princes of the House of Timur is painted using an opaque watercolor (gouache) on a cotton cloth. The dimensions of the painting are listed as 108.00 cm for width and 108.05 cm for height. The painting is damaged, with parts of it having been cut away and lost. Scholars have different interpretations on why the painting is damaged. One interpretation theorizes that the painting was damaged due to the necessary reshaping needed to accommodate the added figures. Another interpretation theorizes that the painting underwent pigment loss over time. It is unknown to scholars what the real reason behind the damage to the painting is. In the center of the painting is a pavilion, with slender crimson pillars. Humayun is seated in the pavilion. Opposite him, Akbar, Jahangir, and Shah Jahan are seated. The figures seated to the right of the pavilion are Abu Bakr Mirza, Baysunghur, and Shahrukh Mirza.

== Significance and purpose ==
Some historians indicate that Princes of the House of Timur was likely supposed to achieve something more than displaying members of the Timurid dynasty together. The Mughal Empire positioned their link to Timur as a part of their identity, and so that sort of image assisted in reminding viewers whence the dynasty had come and why its rule mattered. The Charbagh garden and pavilion are not just decoration either, since those settings were usually connected to ideas of proper leadership and a well-ordered court. Over time, rulers such as Jahangir and Shah Jahan added themselves into the scene, which shows that the painting continued to be reused for the same political message instead of being left unchanged.
