= Medieval Islamic Civilization: An Encyclopedia =

Encyclopedia about culture of the Islamic world edited by Josef W. Meri

Medieval Islamic Civilization: An Encyclopedia is a 2005 encyclopedia in the English language about Islamic culture in the Middle Ages. It was published by Routledge and edited by Josef W. Meri.
