= Sheykhavand family =

Branch of the Safavid dynasty, rulers of Iran 1501 – 1736

The Sheykhavand family was a cadet branch of the Safavid dynasty, the Twelver Shīʿa ruling dynasty of Iran from 1501 to 1736. They were considered a tribe of the Qizilbash, a coalition of predominantly Turkic-speaking tribal groups loyal to the Safavids.

The Sheykhavand were descended from Sheykh Ebrahim, father of Shaykh Junayd (d. 1460). Junayd was the hereditary leader of the Safavid order of Sufism and the grandfather of Shah Ismail I, founder of the Safavid Dynasty. They were established as a tribe by Shah Abbas I (r. 1588–1629), the fifth Safavid shah; this new tribal status was similar to that granted the Cossacks by the Russian Empire in the 1400s.

== Sources ==
- Karakaya-Stump, Ayfer (2021). "Who really were the Kizilbash? a rethinking of the Kizilbash movement in light of new sources and research". In Matthee, Rudi (ed.). The Safavid World. Routledge. pp. 37–55. ISBN 978-1138944060.
- Matthee, Rudi (2015). "Relations between the Center and the Periphery in Safavid Iran: The Western Borderlands v. the Eastern Frontier Zone". The Historian. 77 (3): 431–463. doi:10.1111/hisn.12068. S2CID 143393018.
- Newman, Andrew J. (2008). Safavid Iran: Rebirth of a Persian Empire. I.B.Tauris. ISBN 978-0857716613.
