= Mihr-un-nissa Begum =

Empress consort of the Mughal Empire (de facto)
- Born: c. 1605
- Died: Lahore, Mughal Empire
- Burial: Tomb of Nur Jahan, Lahore, Pakistan
- Spouse: Shahryar Mirza (m. 1621; died 1628)
- Issue: Arzani Begum
- House: Timurid (by marriage)
- Father: Sher Afgan
- Mother: Nur Jahan
- Religion: Shia Islam

Mihr-un-nissa Begum (Persian: مهرالنساء بیگم; born c. 1605), also known as Banu Begum (Persian: بانو بیگم) and Bahu Begum (Persian: بہو بیگم), and better known as Ladli Begum (Persian: لاڈلی بیگم), was the daughter of Empress Nur Jahan and her first husband Sher Afgan of the Mughal Empire. She was the wife of Prince Shahryar Mirza, son of Emperor Jahangir.

== Early life ==
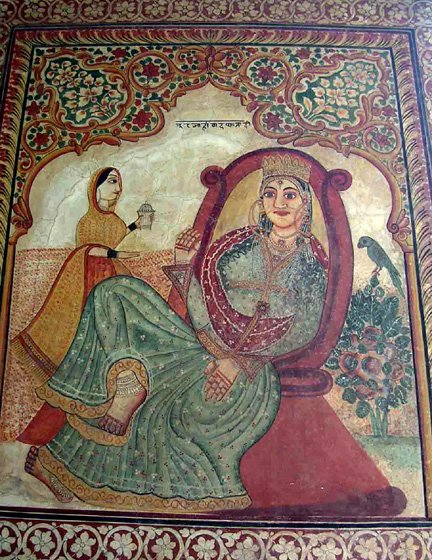
Mural of Nur Jahan and an unidentified companion.

Mehr-un-Nissa Khanum, daughter of Mirza Ghiyas Beg, also known as Itimad-ud-daula, was the mother of Mihr-un-nissa Begum. Mihr-un-nissa, better known as Ladli Begum, was the first cousin of Emperor Shah Jahan's wife, Empress Mumtaz Mahal, the daughter of Abu'l-Hasan Asaf Khan. After Sher Afgan's death in 1607, she and her mother were summoned to Agra by Jahangir for their protection and her mother served as lady-in-waiting to Ruqaiya Sultan Begum, the chief wife of the late Emperor Akbar, for almost two years. In 1611, her mother married Emperor Jahangir, and became known as Nur Jahan.

In 1617, Nur Jahan planned to marry Mihr-un-Nissa to Prince Khusrau Mirza, Jahangir's eldest son, and to re-create him as the heir apparent, in place of Prince Khurram Mirza (future Emperor Shah Jahan). However, Khusrau declined their offer, because he loved his wife, the daughter of Mirza Aziz Koka, who had been with him through the long years of imprisonment and blindness.

== Marriage ==
In 1617, Nur Jahan in order to secure her powers and influence in the Mughal court after the decline of her husband, Jahangir's health, offered the marriage proposal of her daughter to the Khusrau Mirza, the eldest son of Jahangir, with the affirmation of bringing him back to power. He was the first choice of Nur Jahan for the marriage of her daughter, Ladli Begum, as he was the favorite of common people who desperately wanted to see him on the throne. However, the Prince in an effort to uphold the fidelity to his chief wife refused the marriage proposal though his wife begged him to accept the proposal and subsequently, this proposal was passed onto Khurram Mirza who too refused this proposal having disliked the influence of Nur Jahan over his father and her powers in Mughal Court. The proposal of her marriage was finally passed to and accepted by Shahryar Mirza, the younger half-brother of Prince Khusrau and Prince Khurram.

Ladli was about sixteen when she was betrothed to Shahryar Mirza. On 22 December 1620, one lakh rupees in cash and goods as a sachaq to Mirza Ghiyas Beg's quarters, which were accompanied by most of the great Amirs. A large elaborate celebration was held at Ghiyas Beg's quarters. Jahangir, accompanied by the ladies of the imperial harem, also went to his quarters.

The marriage took place on 23 April 1621 and was performed at Ghiyas Beg's house. Here again, Jahangir, accompanied by the ladies of the imperial harem, joined in the celebrations. Several ceremonies were held, the putting on of henna took place at the home of Jahangir’s mother, Mariam-uz-Zamani, and the marriage feast itself took place at the home of Itimad-ud-daula. After eight gharis had elapsed of Thursday night, the wedding took place under favorable auspices.

Muhammad Sharif Mutamid Khan, who observed the events first hand, believed that Nur Jahan's manoeuvrings were jeopardising the security of the state. On 4 September 1623, Mihr-un-nissa gave birth to the couple's only child, a daughter named Arzani Begum, also known as Lardili Begum and Wali Begum.

When Jahangir died on 28 October 1627, her husband Shahryar ascended the throne at Lahore, as her mother Nur Jahan had desired. Shah Jahan ascended the throne on 19 January 1628, and on 23 January, he ordered the execution of Shahryar, Prince Daniyal Mirza's sons Tahmuras Mirza and Hoshang Mirza, and Prince Khusrau Mirza's sons Dawar Bakhsh Mirza, and Garshasp Mirza. By contrast, all of Nur Jahan's former power and authority at once drained away from the erstwhile queen, who now sank to a political nonentity. Coins stamped with her name were withdrawn from circulation. As a result, Nur Jahan, who created chaos with her intrigues in the last years of Jahangir's reign to protect her dominion and the future of her daughter, lost all her dominion and her desire to see her daughter as queen.

== Life as a widow and death ==
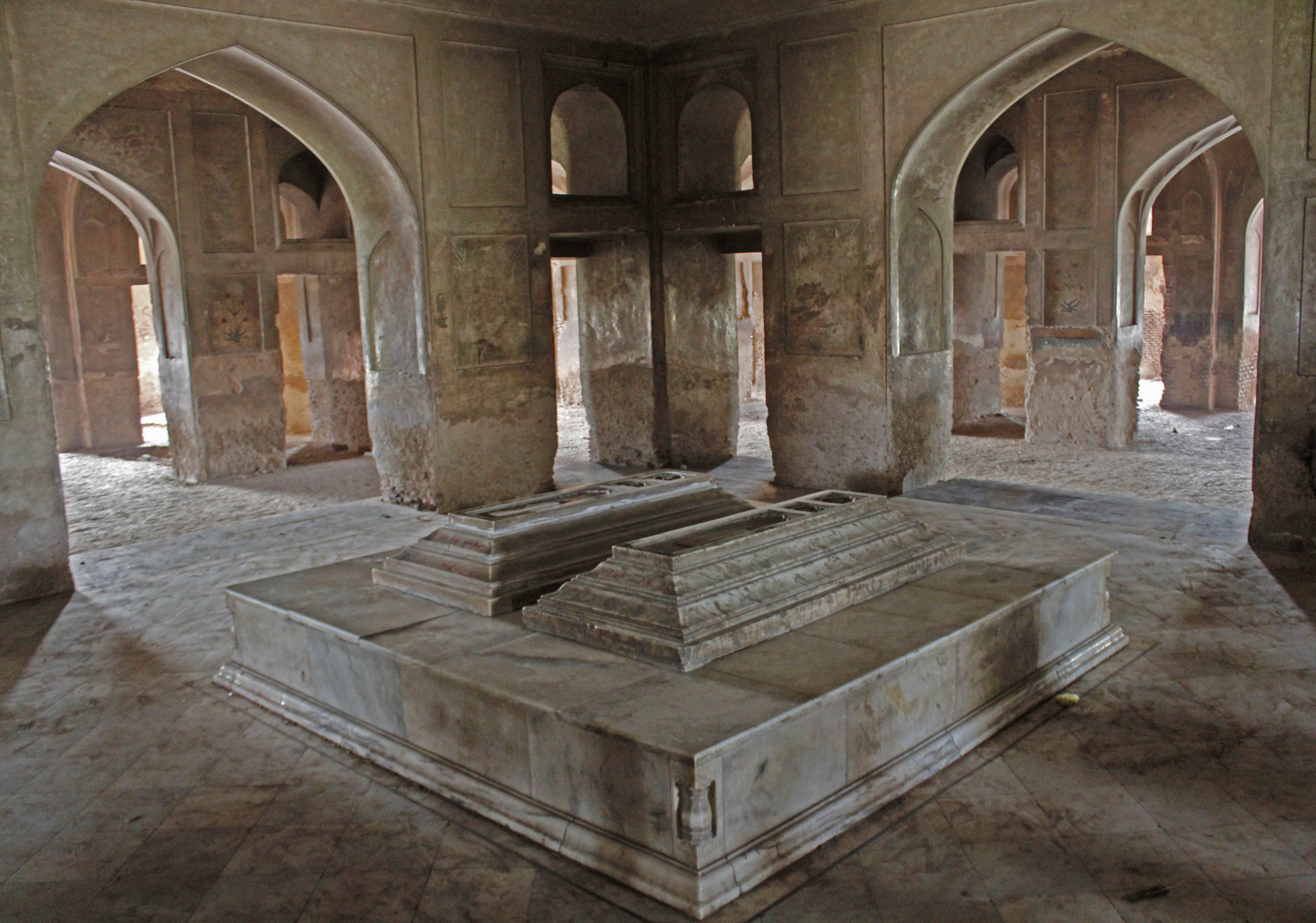
Marble cenotaphs of Ladli and her mother Nur Jahan

Ladli was a young widow of twenty-two when she along with her daughter settled with her mother at Lahore, who was put under house arrest. The three of them lived a simple and austere life. Nur Jahan died in 1645, and had herself buried close to her husband, Jahangir, in a separate mausoleum, which she had built from the funds she received from Emperor Shah Jahan. After her death, Ladli was buried beside her mother in her mausoleum.

== Popular culture ==
=== Films and television ===
- In the 2005 Hindi film Taj Mahal: An Eternal Love Story, she was portrayed by Kim Sharma.

=== In literature ===
- Eminent Bengali writer Narayan Sanyal wrote a historical novel Ladli Begum based on Mihr-un-nissa.
- Mihr-un-nissa is a character in Indu Sundaresan's historical novel The Feast of Roses: A Novel (2003).
- Mihr-un-nissa is a character in Indu Sundaresan's historical novel The Indu Sundaresan Collection: The Twentieth Wife, Feast of Roses, and Shadow Princess (2013).

== Bibliography ==
- Nicoll, Fergus (2009). Shah Jahan: The Rise and Fall of the Mughal Emperor. Penguin Books India. ISBN 978-0-670-08303-9.
- Jahangir, Emperor; Thackston, Wheeler McIntosh (1999). The Jahangirnama : memoirs of Jahangir, Emperor of India. Washington, D. C.: Freer Gallery of Art, Arthur M. Sackler Gallery, Smithsonian Institution; New York: Oxford University Press. ISBN 978-0-19-512718-8.
- Findly, E.B. (1993). Nur Jahan, Empress of Mughal India [128]. Oxford University Press E-Books. Oxford University Press. ISBN 978-0-1950-7488-8.
