= Shahryar Mirza =

De facto Mughal emperor from 1627 to 1628

Shahryar Mirza شهریار میرزا
- Shahzada of Mughal Empire; Mirza
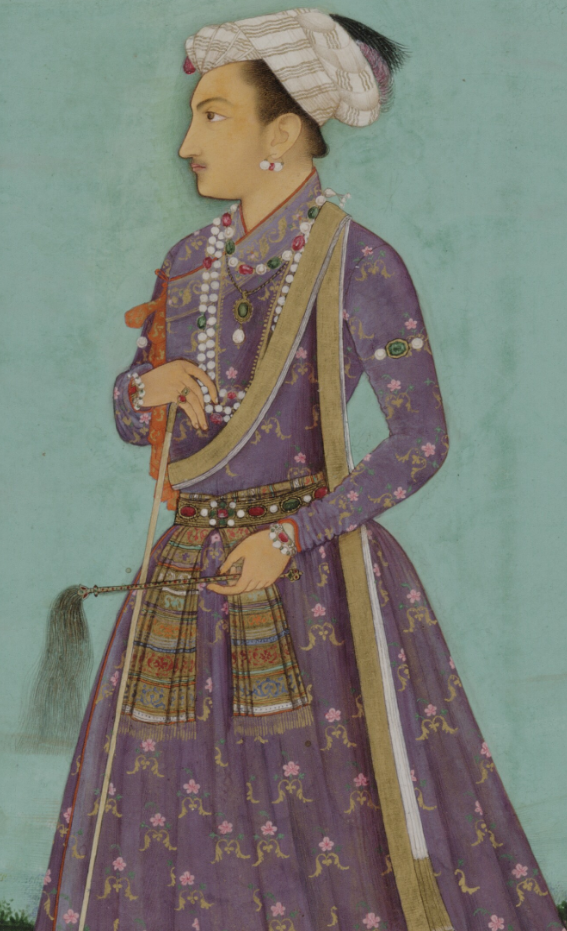
- Mirza Shahryar in his youth

Mughal Emperor (de facto)
- Reign: 7 November 1627 – 19 January 1628 (with Dawar Bakhsh)
- Predecessor: Jahangir
- Successor: Dawar Bakhsh (titular) Shah Jahan

Subahdar of Thatta
- Reign: 13 October 1625 – 1626
- Predecessor: Bayazid Bukhari
- Successor: Abu Saeed
- Born: 16 January 1605; Satna, Illahabad Subah, Mughal Empire
- Died: 23 January 1628 (aged 23); Lahore, Lahore Subah, Mughal Empire
- Burial: 23–24 January 1628; Lahore
- Spouse: Mihr-un-nissa Begum (m. 1621)
- Issue: Arzani Begum
Names
- Mirza Salaf-ud-Din Muhammad Shahryar
- House: Mughal
- Dynasty: Timurid
- Father: Jahangir
- Religion: Sunni Islam (Hanafi)

Shahryar Mirza (Persian: شهریار میرزا, born Salaf-ud-Din Muhammad Shahryar; 6 January 1605 – 23 January 1628) was the fifth and youngest son of the Mughal emperor Jahangir. Toward the end of Jahangir’s life, and after his death, Shahryar attempted to claim the throne with the support of his influential stepmother and mother-in-law, Nur Jahan. Although Shahryar briefly held power in Lahore from 7 November 1627 to 19 January 1628, he largely relied on Nur Jahan to govern on his behalf. However, their attempt to secure the throne failed. He was defeated and later executed by his brother Khurram Mirza, who became emperor under the name Shah Jahan. Although Shahryar briefly ruled, he is generally not included in the official list of Mughal emperors.

== Early years ==
Shahryar was born a few months before his grandfather, Emperor Akbar's death in 1605.

In 1621, Shahryar married Mihr-un-nissa Begum (also known as Banu, Bahu or Ladli Begum), the daughter of his potentate and domineering step-mother Nur Jahan by her first marriage to Sher Afghan. Shahryar and Mihr-un-nissa had a daughter Arzani Begum (also known as Lardili or Wali Begum), born on 4 September 1623.

At Nur Jahan's request, he was given the pargana of Dholpur and its fort from Jahangir which Prince Khurram wanted for himself. He appointed Daria Khan, an Afghan, as its in-charge. This led to a skirmish between Nur Jahan's appointed in-charge Sharifu-l-Mulk, who was a servant of both Shahryar and Daria Khan. Sharifu-l-Mulk arrived on the scene shortly, and tried to force himself into the fort.

On October 13, 1625, Jahangir appointed Shahryar as Governor of Thatta. Sharif-ul Mulk carried out the administration as the Deputy of the Prince.

== Reign (1627–1628) ==
After the death of his father Jahangir on 28 October 1627, Shahryar, as Nur Jahan desired, ascended to the Mughal throne, but for only three months. Since he was in Lahore at the time, he immediately took over the imperial treasury and distributed over 70 lakh rupees among old and new noblemen to secure his throne. Meanwhile, on the death of the Emperor, Mirza Baisinghar, son of the late Prince Daniyal, fled to Lahore and joined Shahryar.

Soon, near Lahore, Shahryar's forces met those of Asaf Khan, (father of Mumtaz Mahal), who wanted his son-in-law Shah Jahan to ascend the throne, and had already proclaimed Dawar Bakhsh as Emperor near Agra, as a stop-gap arrangement to save the throne for Shah Jahan. Shahryar lost the battle and fled into the fort, where the next morning he was presented in front of Dawar Baksh, who placed him in confinement and two to three days later had him blinded by Asaf Khan, thus bringing his short reign to a tragic end. It is said that Shahryar also had a form of leprosy due to which he had lost all his hair including his eyebrows and eyelashes.

== Poetry ==
Like all Mughal princes, Shahryar had training in poetry. Towards the end of his life, while blind, he wrote a poignant verse titled Bi Gu Kur Shud didah-i-Aftab.

== Death ==
On the 2nd Jumada-l awwal, 1037 AH (1628), Shah Jahan ascended to the throne at Lahore, and on the 26th Jumada-l awwal, January 23, 1628, upon his orders, Dawar, his brother Garshasp, Shahryar, and Tahmuras and Hoshang, sons of the deceased Prince Daniyal, were all put to death by Asaf Khan.

== Aftermath ==
After Shahryar's death, Shah Jahan ruled the empire for thirty years, until imprisoned by Aurangzeb and dying eight years later.

Asaf Khan, was made the prime minister of Mughal Empire, and Nur Jahan, with an annual pension of two lakh and spent the rest of her days, confined in her palace in Lahore, along with her daughter Mihr-un-nissa Begum, the widow of Shahryar. Nur Jahan died in 1645 at age 68.

== Popular culture ==
=== Films and television ===
- In the 2005 Hindi film Taj Mahal: An Eternal Love Story, he was portrayed by Rahil Azam.
