= Siyaasat =

Indian historical television series

- Genre: Historical fiction
- Based on: The Twentieth Wife by Indu Sundaresan
- Directed by: Siddharth Anand Kumar, Jay Dev Banerjee, Danish Aslam, Yogesh Bhati, Rishab Seth
- Starring: Charu Shankar; Sudhanshu Pandey; Uday Tikekar; Deepika Amin; Shaynam Ladakhi; Jannat Zubair Rahmani
- Country of origin: India
- Original language: Hindi
- No. of seasons: 1
- No. of episodes: 42

Production
- Producer: Jay Dev Banerjee
- Production location: Rajasthan
- Camera setup: Multi-camera
- Running time: 60 minutes
- Production company: Indigo Creation Productions

Original release
- Network: The EPIC Channel
- Release: 20 November 2014

Siyaasat (English: Politics) is a 2014 Indian fictional drama which aired on The EPIC Channel. The series is an adaptation of the popular 2002 award-winning fictional novel The Twentieth Wife by author Indu Sundaresan.

The series revolves around Mughal politics, inter-personal conflicts, sabotage, grandeur, power and the love between Prince Salim (the Mughal emperor Jahangir) and Mehrunissa also known as Nur Jahan, who was Salim's twentieth and final wife. It is now available on EPIC On, EPIC TV's streaming platform and on Prime Video as well.

== Plot ==
Siyaasat is mainly about the journey of Mehrunissa to become Nur Jahan. It is based in the era of Mughal rule where Akbar is the Emperor. The show focuses on the battle between the princes to become the heir to the throne and also on Salim - Mehrunissa's love story. The other prominent aspects of the show are the politics in the harem between Jagat Gosaini, Ruqaiya Sultan Begum and other women, the rivals of Akbar like Malik Amber, Chand Bibi and Rana Pratap and the political turmoil in Akbar's court between Abul Fazl, Mirza Ghias Beg and Abdul Rahim Khan-I-Khana

== Cast ==
- Uday Tikekar as Emperor Akbar
- Deepika Amin as Empress Ruqaiya Sultan Begum, Akbar's first wife and Padshah Begum.
- Karanvir Sharma/Sudhanshu Pandey as Prince Salim (Jahangir), Akbar's eldest son
- Charu Shankar as Mehrunissa (Empress Nur Jahan), wife of Sher Afghan Khan and illicit lover of Prince Salim. She eventually marries her lover, the emperor Jehangir.
- Neetha Shetty as Maan Bai, Salim's first wife and mother of Prince Khusrau Mirza.
- Shaynam Ladakhi as Mehmood, Nur Jahan's brother and Hoshiyar's lover.
- Nayani Dixit as Jagat Gosain, Salim's second wife and later Padshah Begum and the mother of Prince Khurram ( Shah Jahan).
- Jannat Zubair Rahmani as Young Mehrunissa
- KC Shankar as Sher Afghan Khan, a nobleman and husband of Mehrunnisa, who hates Prince Salim because the latter is Mehrunnisa's illicit lover
- Pawan Chopra as Mirza Ghiyas Beg, Mehrunnisa's father
- Suparna Marwah as Asmat Begum, Mehrunnisa's mother
- Gurpreet Saini as Prince Murad, second son of Akbar
- Mokshad Dodwani as Prince Daniyal, third son of Akbar
- Bikramjeet Kanwarpal as Abul Fazl, a beloved friend, advisor and courtier of Emperor Akbar
- Nagesh Salwan as Abdul Rahim Khan-i-Khanan, a courtier of Akbar and Salim who later supports prince Khusrau in his rebellion against his father Salim (Emperor Jehangir)
- Kavin Dave as Qutubuddin Koka, courtier loyal to Salim, appointed commander-in-chief after Salim becomes Emperor
- Omkar Kapoor as Mahabat Khan, courtier loyal to Salim, appointed Grand Vazir (Wazir) after Salim becomes Emperor
- Ravy Sharma as Abu'l-Hasan Asaf Khan, brother of Mehrunissa, father of Arjumand Banu Begum (Mumtaz Mahal)
- Ashraf Nagoo as Hoshiyar Khan, Mehmood's lover.
- Ashnoor Kaur as Arjumand Banu Begum (Mumtaz Mahal)
- Rupali Krishnarao as Sharif un-Nissa (Anarkali), a courtesan from Lahore
- Devansh Dixit as Shah Jahan

== Production ==
The series was shot over a period of six months in Bikaner, Rajasthan, with the Laxmi Niwas Palace acting as a substitute for Emperor Akbar's palace in Lahore. Costumes for the series have been designed by Pia Benegal, the daughter of director Shyam Benegal.

Charu Shankar made her Indian television debut with Siyaasat. She described how she bagged the lead role, "I had read all three books in the Taj Mahal trilogy and liked them. The producers called me and said that they were trying to make a Game of Thrones-style series out of it, to which I said, "Excellent. What role do you want me for?" And that is when I got to know that it was for Mehrunissa [Nur Jahan's birth name]. I was driving at that moment and I almost banged my car out of excitement." Shankar described how she prepared for the role of Nur Jahan. "I had a month to prepare for the role before we went to Bikaner, which is where we shot the series. I happened to be doing an art history course at the National Museum at that time and I spent it at the gallery studying Mughal miniatures and trying to imagine the world that Mehrunissa lived in."

The show has been shot across various scenic locales in Rajasthan and real palaces of Bikaner. Siyaasat brings alive the decadent lifestyle, architecture, art, and stories of the Mughal royalty.
