= Sher Afghan Khan =

Nobility of the Mughal Empire (?-1607)

Sherafghan Khan
- شيرافگن خان
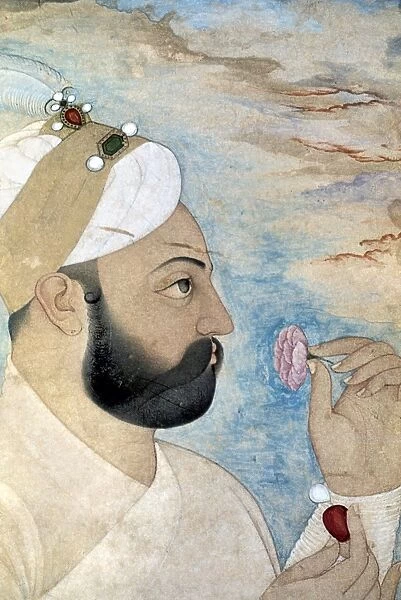
- Mughal painting of Sher Afghan Khan c.16th—17th century

Jagirdar of Badh-e-Dewan
- In office 1605 – 30 May 1607
- Monarch: Jahangir

Personal details
- Born: Ali Quli Istajlu Yasuj, Safavid Iran
- Died: 30 May 1607 Badh-e-Dewan, Bengal Subah, Mughal Empire
- Resting place: Raiganj, Bardhaman, West Bengal
- Spouse: Nur Jahan
- Children: Mihr-un-nissa Begum
- Relatives: Shahryar Mirza (son-in-law)

Ali Quli Istajlu (Persian: علی‌قلی استاجلو), commonly known as Sherafghan Khan (Persian: شيرافگن خان), initially served as the safarchi (lit. 'table-attendant') of the Safavids, and later became a Mughal courtier, becoming the jagirdar of Burdwan in West Bengal (1605–1607). He was also the first husband of Nur Jahan (Mehrunissa), who later married Jahangir after Ali Quli Khan's death and became Empress of India and the power behind the emperor.

He was given the title Sherafghan Khan (lit. 'tiger grappler') by Prince Salim, Jahangir after his meritorious actions during a war with the Rana of Mewar. Ali Quli Khan Istajlu was educated under the instructions of Shah Ismail II of the Safavid dynasty in Iran. Like his wife, Sher Afghan was also an immigrant from Persia, who fled from Iran to Kandahar, then in India.

He was the father of a daughter called Mihr-un-nissa Begum, after she married Prince Shahryar, the fifth and youngest son of Jahangir and rival to Shah Jahan.

== Biography ==
=== Life ===
Ali Quli Khan Istajlu was a member of the Turkoman Ustajlu tribe, and was the safarchi (table-attendant) of Ismail II, the third Safavid king (shah) of Iran (1576–78). After the Shah's death, Ali Quli came to Kandahar, and at Multan he met Abdul Rahim Khan-i-Khanan who made him a royal employee while in the field.

Later, on Khan-i-Khanan's recommendation, Ali Quli received a mansab, Thatta (in present-day Pakistan). During the following years he rendered distinguished services to Akbar, and moved to the royal courts at Lahore.

Soon after his arrival at the royal courts in 1594, Ain-e-Akbari suggests, Akbar ordered his marriage to the seventeen-year-old Mehrunissa (the future Empress Nur Jahan), daughter of Mirza Ghias Beg. Ghias’s wife had access to the royal harem, and on her visits there she was often accompanied by Mehrunissa. There Prince Salim reportedly saw her and fell in love with her, and to avoid scandal, Akbar quickly married her to Ali Quli. Some historians suggest that when Prince Salim saw her, she was already engaged to be married to Ali Quli, and thus the prince couldn't marry her on that account.

When Prince Salim revolted against Akbar, Ali Quli sided with Akbar against the prince, but when Salim finally ascended to the Mughal throne in 1605 and took the name Jahangir, he pardoned Ali Quli along with all those who favoured Akbar instead of him. Ali Quli was made a jagirdar and received the region of Bardhaman in West Bengal as his domain.

=== Death ===
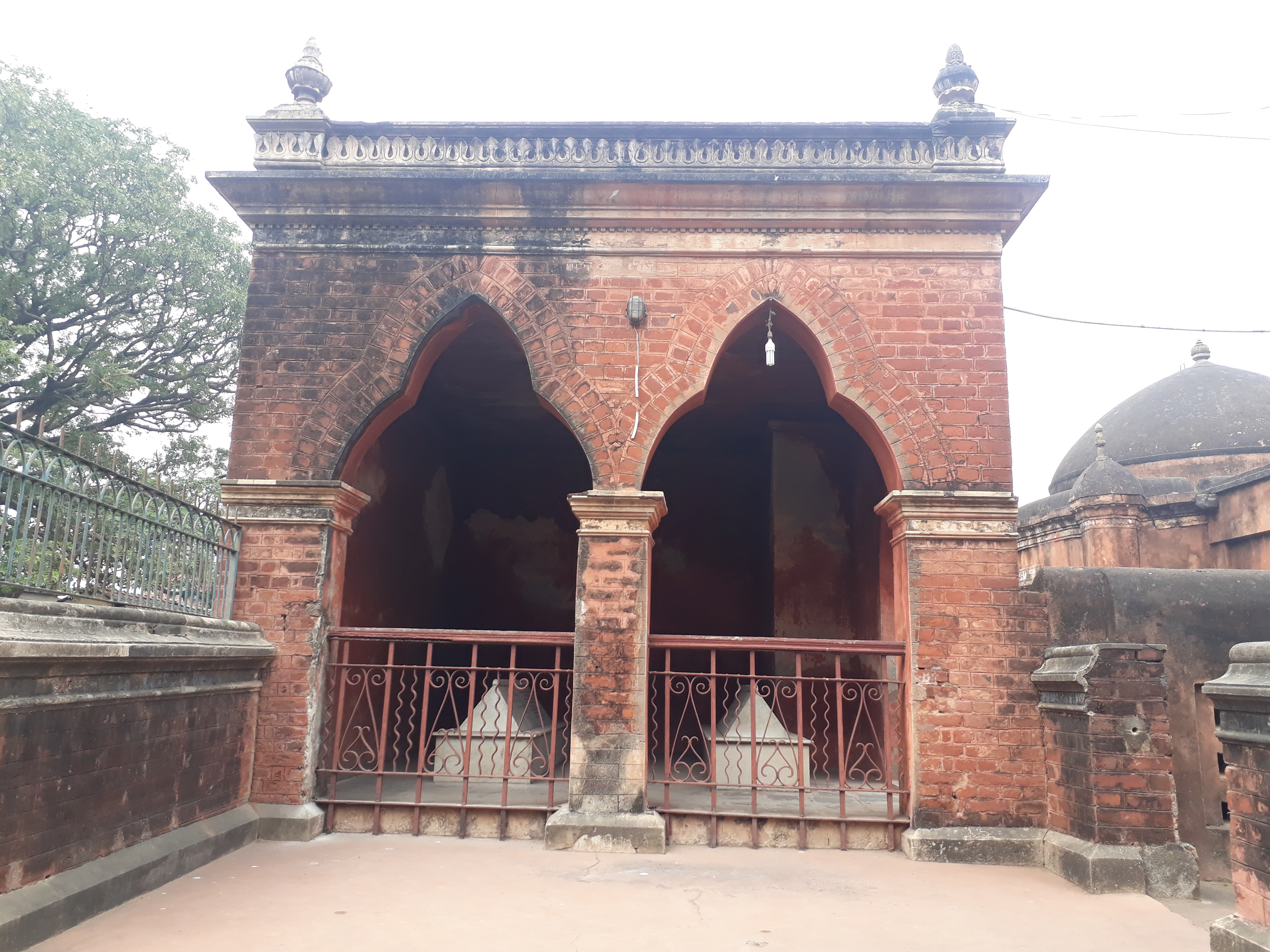
Tomb of Sher Afghan Khan and Qutbuddin in Bahram Saqqa mosque complex

Shaikh Khubu, Qutbuddin Khan Koka, (Khan-i-Chishti), was the foster-brother of Jahangir, as his mother was a daughter of Shaikh Salim. When Jahangir ascended the throne of Mughal Empire in 1605, Qutbuddin was made the subedar (Governor) of Bengal, by replacing Raja Man Singh. Meanwhile, Sher Afghan Ali Quli Istajlu was tahvildar of Bardhaman, also in the province of Bengal. Numerous Mansabs and titles were bestowed on his son Sheikh Farid who eventually became the Governor of Budaun. His descendants still live in a fort (now in ruins) in Sheikhupur, Budaun.

In 1607, Qutbuddin Khan Koka was instructed to send Sher Afghan Khan to the court as he was accused of negligence and siding with Afghan rebels and transferred. Sher Afghan Khan refused to obey. Seeing this, Qutbuddin started off for Bardhaman, while he sent Ghiasa, the son of his sister, in advance to pacify Sher Afghan and bring him to the court. So upon his arrival on 30 May 1607, Sher Afghan duly went to meet him, accompanied by two men. At that moment Qutb signalled his men to arrest Sher Afghan, who stepped forward in alarm and attacked Qutbuddin sensing treachery. Qutbuddin was fatally wounded, and seeing this, his men surrounded Sher Afghan and killed him instantly.

Qutbuddin, who was fatally wounded, died later in the night. This caused much grief to Jahangir as he mentions in his memoirs, Tuzk-e-Jahangiri, where he also mentions his elation at the death of Ali Quli and hopes that "the blackfaced wretch will forever remain in hell".

The claim that Ali Quli was killed because the emperor coveted his wife has been discounted by many later historians, who cite the fact that if Jahangir had had any such intentions, he wouldn't have bestowed upon Ali Quli the title Sher Afghan, or pardoned him after he ascended the throne, or given him Bardhaman.

Another historical writer, Khafi Khan, mentions another tale about Ali Quli's death, which is said to have been related by Nur Jahan's mother. According to her, Sher Afghan did not die immediately when he was attacked by Qutbuddin's men, but wounded as he was, he managed to get to the door of his house with the intention of killing his wife, whom he did not wish to fall into the emperor's hands. But her mother would not let him enter, and told him to mind his wounds, especially as Mehrunissa had committed suicide by throwing herself into a well. "Having heard the sad news, Sher Afghan went to the heavenly mansions." Historians do not credit this tale, however.

His tomb is situated within the shrine complex of the poet Bahram Saqqa, in the present day city of Bardhaman in West Bengal, next to the tomb of Qutbuddin.

== Nur Jahan's remarriage ==
After Ali Quli's death, his wife Mehrunissa, was sent to the royal harem, where she spent next four years as lady-in-waiting to Ruqaiya Sultan Begum. As the story progresses, in March 1611, during the New Year Day Nauroz celebrations, Prince Salim happened to see Mehrunissa at Meena Bazar Agra and immediately proposed her for marriage but actually their connection was even before the marriage of Nurjahan and Ali Quli. Mehrunissa and Prince Salim were married two months later, on 25 May 1611, which made her Jahangir's twentieth wife as Nur Mahal, 'Light of the castle', and in 1616, she was given the title Nur Jahan, 'the Light of the World'. After marrying Jahangir, Nur Jahan slowly gathered the all powers of the government in her hands and became the active and dominant force behind the Mughal throne.

Ali Quli's daughter, Mihr-un-nissa Begum, was married to Prince Shahryar, Jahangir's fifth son in 1620. Shahryar went on to briefly occupy the Mughal throne at Lahore, under the manoeuvring of Nur Jahan, after the death of Jahangir on 27 October 1627. He was later captured by Mughal forces led by Asaf Khan, and − first blinded by the orders of Prince Dawar − was later executed by Asaf Khan, at the order of Shah Jahan, who finally ascended the Mughal throne after executing all his remaining brothers. After Qutubuddin Koka's and Sher Afghan Khan's death, the next subedar of Bengal was Jahāngīr Qulī Beg or Jahāngīr Qulī Khān (1607–1608) and when he died, Islam Khan (June 1608–died August 1613) was made the subhadar of bengal.

== Popular culture ==
=== Films and television ===
- In the 1967 film Noor Jehan, he is portrayed by Sheikh Mukhtar.
- In the 2000–2001 Indian series Noorjahan produced by Cinevistaas, he is portrayed by Puneet Issar.
- In the 2014 historical drama series Siyaasat aired on The EPIC Channel, he is portrayed by KC Shankar.
- In the 2023 ZEE5's web series Taj: Divided by Blood, he is portrayed by Arman Khera.

== Sources ==
- Chandra, Satish (2005). Medieval India: From Sultanat to the Mughals Part – II. Har-Anand Publications. ISBN 978-8124110669.
- Eraly, Abraham (2000). Emperors of the Peacock Throne: The Saga of the Great Mughals. Penguin Books India. ISBN 9780141001432.
