= Sheikh Mukhtar =

Actor from India (1914-1980)

- Born: 24 December 1914; Delhi, British India
- Died: 12 May 1980 (aged 65); Karachi, Sindh, Pakistan
- Occupation: Actor
- Years active: 1939–1973
- Parent: Chaudhry Ashfaq Ahmed (father)

Sheikh Mukhtar (24 December 1914 – 12 May 1980) was a film actor active in India and later in Pakistan.

A tall and manly figure, who stood slightly under 6 ft 4 in (1.93 m), Sheikh Mukhtar played a variety of film roles, from leading roles in many of Mehboob Khan's productions to characters roles later on, mostly the roles of villains.

== Early life ==
Sheikh Mukhtar was the son of Chaudhry Ashfaq Ahmed, who was a railway police inspector and was born in Karachi, British India; now Pakistan. Chaudhary Ashfaq Ahmed intentionally got transferred and migrated to Delhi. Sheikh Mukhtar was born on 24 December 1914 in Delhi.

He had spent his childhood years in Choodi Waalan Gali (near Jama Mosque, Delhi) and received education at an Anglo-Arabic school, Ajmeri Gate, Delhi. His father wanted his son to join the Police or Army, but Sheikh Mukhtar was keenly interested in theatre. One of his neighbours from his area started working in a theatre company, so Sheikh Mukhtar also moved to Kolkata and joined the company.

== Career ==
=== India ===
Sheikh Mukhtar got his break with Mehboob Khan's Ek Hi Raasta (1939), earning a lead role in his first movie, and would play the lead in numerous later Mehboob Khan movies. He starred in several lead roles throughout the 1940s, and by the 1950s, he expanded his contributions to cinema by founding his own production company, Mukhtar Films; among his box-office successes was the film Mr. Lambu (1956).

=== Pakistan ===
Mukhtar had produced Noor Jehan (1967), a Hindi movie, with hopes for it to be a 'hit' like Mughal-e-Azam (1960), but his movie flopped badly in India, which in turn disappointed him and he was heartbroken and probably this made him leave India for Pakistan. And along with him, he took the original prints of film Noor Jehan, which was released in Pakistan twelve days after his death in 1980, and became a 'hit' film there, earning approximately Rs. 1 crore. In the movie he played the supporting role of Sher Afghan Quli Khan, the first husband of Queen Nur Jahan.

== Final years and death ==
After migrating from India to Pakistan in the late 1960s, he settled in Karachi, Pakistan. After some years there, he suffered a cardiac arrest on his flight from Lahore to Karachi and died in Karachi on 12 May 1980.

== Selected filmography ==
Year	Title	Role	Producer	Director	Note	Ref
1939	Ek Hi Raasta	Mangoo		Mehboob Khan	Lead role	
1941	Bahen	Amar		Mehboob Khan	Lead role	
1942	Roti	Balam		Mehboob Khan	Lead role	
1944	Shahenshah Babar	Babur		Wajahat Mirza	Lead role	
1947	Bhookh			Safdar Aah	Lead role	
1948	Anokha Pyar			M. I. Dharamsey	Supporting role	
1949	Dada			Harish	Lead role	
1954	Baadbaan			Phani Majumdar	Supporting role	
1956	Mr. Lambu		Yes	Nisar Ahmad Ansari	Lead role	
1957	Changez Khan	Gengis Khan		Kedar Kapoor	Lead role	
1957	Halaku			D. D. Kashyap	Supporting role	
1959	Do Ustad	Jagannath	Yes	Tara Harish	Supporting role	
1963	Ustadon Ke Ustad	Mangal Singh		Brij	Supporting role	
1965	Hum Sab Ustad Hai	Romi		Maruti Rao	Supporting role	
1967	Noor Jehan	Sher Afghan Quli Khan	Yes	M. Sadiq	Supporting role	
1968	Nadir Shah	Nadir Shah		S. N. Tripathi	Lead role	
1973	Hum Sub Chor Hain	Shaikh		Marutirao Parab	Lead role	
