= Nur Jahan =

Padshah Begum of the Mughal Empire

- Empress consort of the Mughal Empire
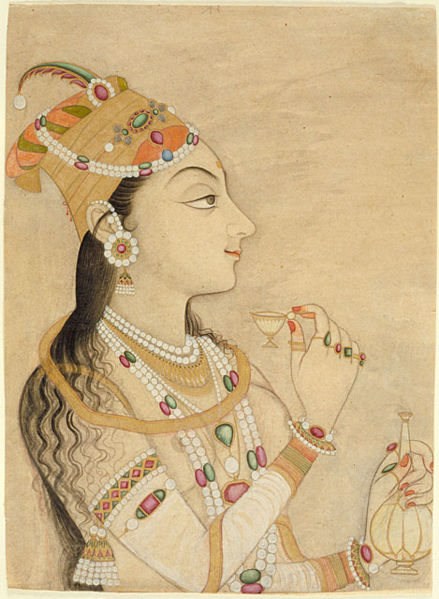
- Idealised portrait of the Mughal Empress Nur Jahan c. 1725-1750

Padshah Begum
- Tenure: 10 June 1620 – 28 October 1627
- Predecessor: Saliha Banu Begum
- Successor: Mumtaz Mahal
- Born: Mehr-un-Nissa; 31 May 1577; Kandahar, Kabul Subah, Mughal Empire (present-day Afghanistan)
- Died: 17 December 1645 (aged 68); Lahore, Lahore Subah, Mughal Empire (present-day Punjab, Pakistan)
- Burial: Tomb of Nur Jahan, Lahore
- Spouse: Sher Afgan Khan (m. 1594; d. 1607); Jahangir (m. 1611; d. 1627)
- Issue: Ladli Begum
- House: Muhammad Sharif (by birth); Timurid (by marriage)
- Father: Mirza Ghiyas Beg
- Mother: Asmat Begum
- Religion: Shia Islam

Nur Jahan (Persian: نورجهان, lit. 'Light of the World'; 31 May 1577 – 18 December 1645), born Mehr-un-Nissa, was the twentieth wife and chief consort of the Mughal emperor Jahangir.

More decisive and proactive than her husband, Nur Jahan is considered by certain historians to have been the real power behind the throne for more than a decade. Wielding a level of power and influence unprecedented for a Mughal empress, she was granted honours and privileges never enjoyed by any of her predecessors or successors, such as having coinage struck in her name. Jahangir had severe addictions to hunting, alcohol, and opium and he also had to contend with his frequent ill-health. Nur Jahan rose to power due to her intellect, political skill, and ability to forge strategic alliances in the imperial court in her husband’s negligence.

== Birth and early life (1577–1594) ==
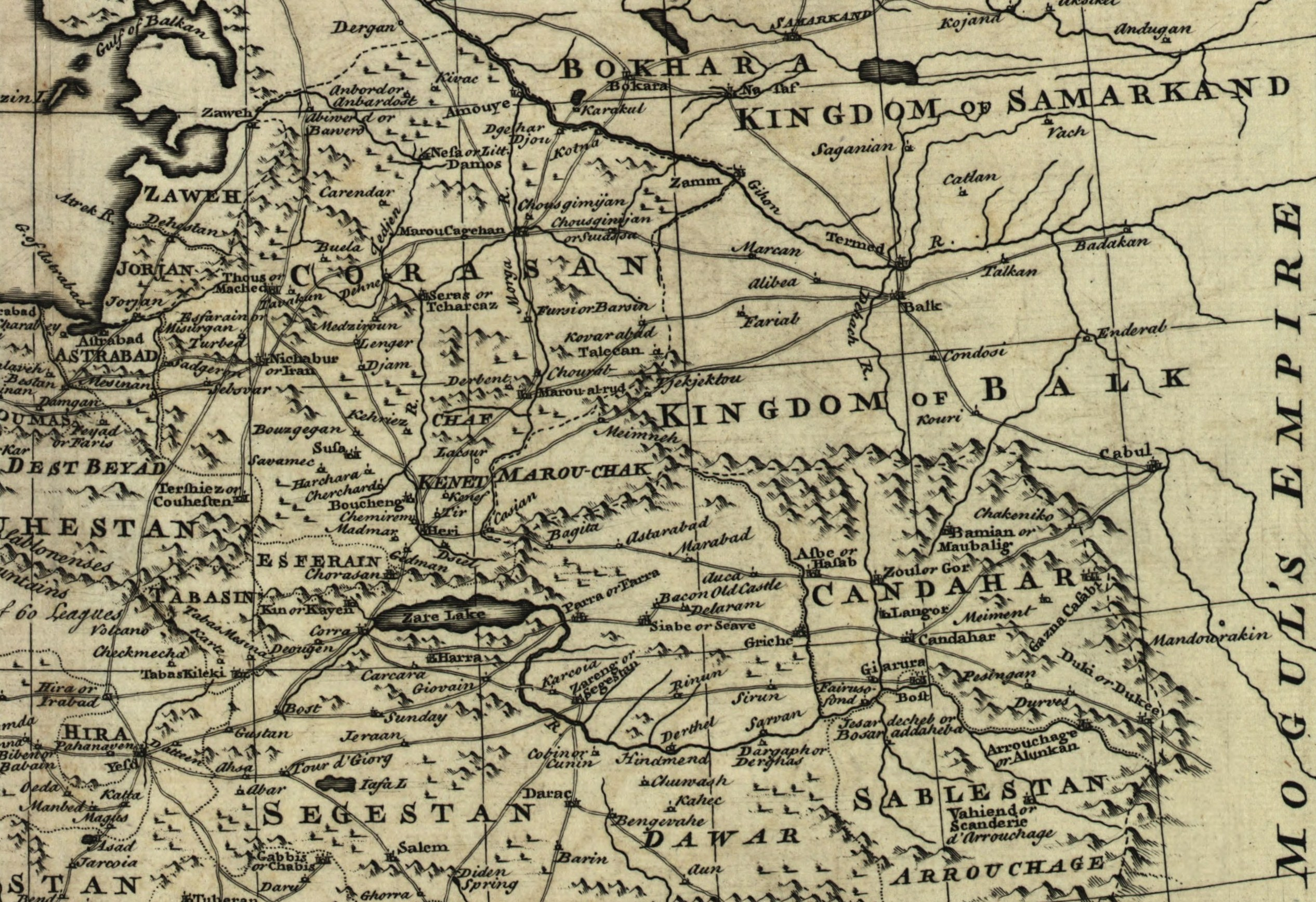
Kandahar (Kandahar), Nur Jahan's place of birth, is now southern Afghanistan

Nur Jahan was born as Mehr-un-Nissa (1577) in Kandahar, present-day Afghanistan, into a family of Persian nobility and was the second daughter and fourth child of the Persian aristocrat Mirza Ghiyas Beg and his wife Asmat Begum. Both of Nur Jahan's parents were descendants of illustrious families – Ghiyas Beg from Muhammad Sharif and Asmat Begum from the Aqa Mulla clan. Her paternal grandfather, Khwaja Muhammad Sharif, was first a wazir to Tatar Sultan the governor of Khurasan, and later was in the service of Shah Tahmasp, who made him the wazir of Isfahan, in recognition of his excellent service. For unknown reasons, Ghiyas Beg's family suffered a reversal in fortunes in 1577 and soon found circumstances in their homeland intolerable. Hoping to improve his family's fortunes, Ghiyas Beg chose to relocate to Mughal India where the Emperor Akbar's court was said to be at the centre of the growing trade industry and cultural scene.

Halfway along their route the family was attacked by robbers who took from them their remaining meager possessions. Left with only two mules, Ghiyas Beg, his pregnant wife, and their two children (Muhammad Sharif, Asaf Khan) were forced to take turns riding on the backs of the animals for the remainder of their journey. When the family arrived in Kandahar, Asmat Begum gave birth to their second daughter. The family was so impoverished they feared they would be unable to take care of the newborn baby. Fortunately, the family was taken in by a caravan led by the merchant noble Malik Masud, who would later assist Ghiyas Beg in finding a position in the service of Emperor Akbar. Believing that the child had signaled a change in the family's fate, she was named Mehr-un-Nissa or 'Sun among Women'. Her father Ghiyas Beg began his career in India, after being given a mansab of 300 in 1577. Thereafter he was appointed diwan (treasurer) for the province of Kabul. Due to his astute skills at conducting business, he quickly rose through the ranks of the high administrative officials. For his excellent work he was awarded the title of Itimad-ud-Daula or 'Pillar of the State' by the emperor.

As a result of his work and promotions, Ghiyas Beg was able to ensure that Mehr-un-Nissa (the future Nur Jahan) had the best possible education. She became well-versed in Arabic and Persian languages, art, literature, music and dance. The poet and author Vidya Dhar Mahajan later praised Nur Jahan as having a piercing intelligence, a volatile temper and sound common sense.

== Marriage to Sher Afgan Khan (1594–1607) ==
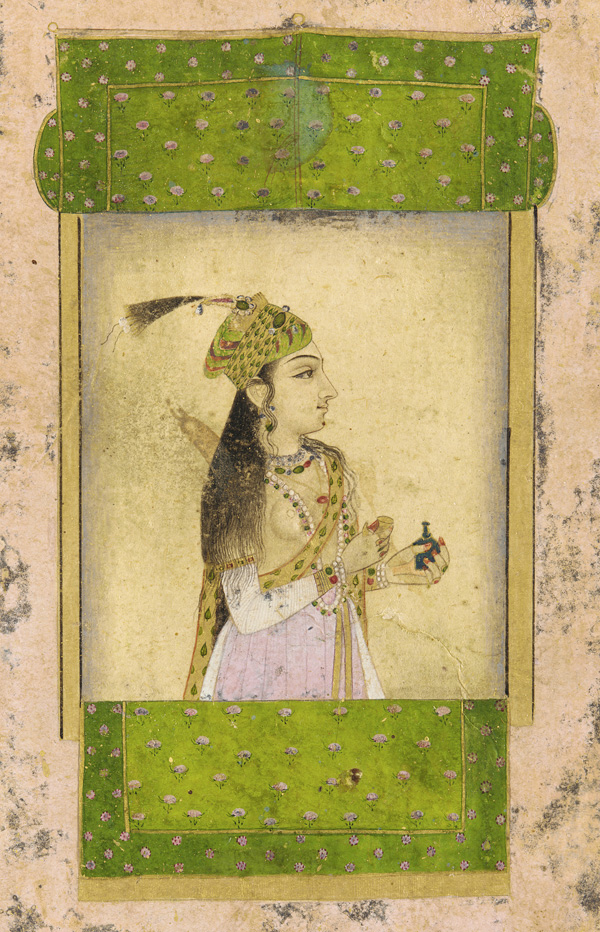
A noble lady, Mughal dynasty, India. 17th century, most likely Nur Jahan

In 1594, when Nur Jahan was seventeen years old, she married her first husband Ali Quli Istajlu (also known as Sher Afgan Khan). Sher Afgan was an adventurous Persian who had been forced to flee his home in Persia after the demise of his first master Shah Ismail II. He later joined the Mughal army and served under the Emperors Akbar and Jahangir. As a reward for his loyal service, Akbar arranged Nur Jahan's marriage with Sher Afgan. Their only child together, a daughter, Mihr-un-Nissa Begum, popularly known as Ladli Begum, was born in 1605. While participating in a military campaign in Mewar under Prince Salim, Ali Quli Istajlu was bestowed the title of Sher Afgan or "Tiger Tosser". Sher Afgan's role in the rout of the Rana of Udaipur inspired this reward, but contemporaries did not record his exact actions. A popular explanation is that Sher Afgan saved Salim from an angry tigress.

In 1607, Sher Afgan Khan was killed after it was rumoured he had refused to obey a summons from the Governor of Bengal, took part in anti-state activities, and attacked the governor when he came to escort Sher Afgan to court. Some have suspected Jahangir of arranging Sher Afgan's death because the latter was said to have fallen in love with Nur Jahan and had been denied the right to add her to his harem. The validity of this rumour is uncertain as Jahangir only married Nur Jahan in 1611, four years after she came to his court. Furthermore, contemporary accounts offer few details as to whether or not a love affair existed prior to 1611 and historians have questioned Jahangir's logic in bestowing honours upon Sher Afgan if he wished to see him removed from the picture.

== As Mughal Empress ==
=== Lady-in-waiting to Ruqaiya Sultan Begum (1607–1611) ===
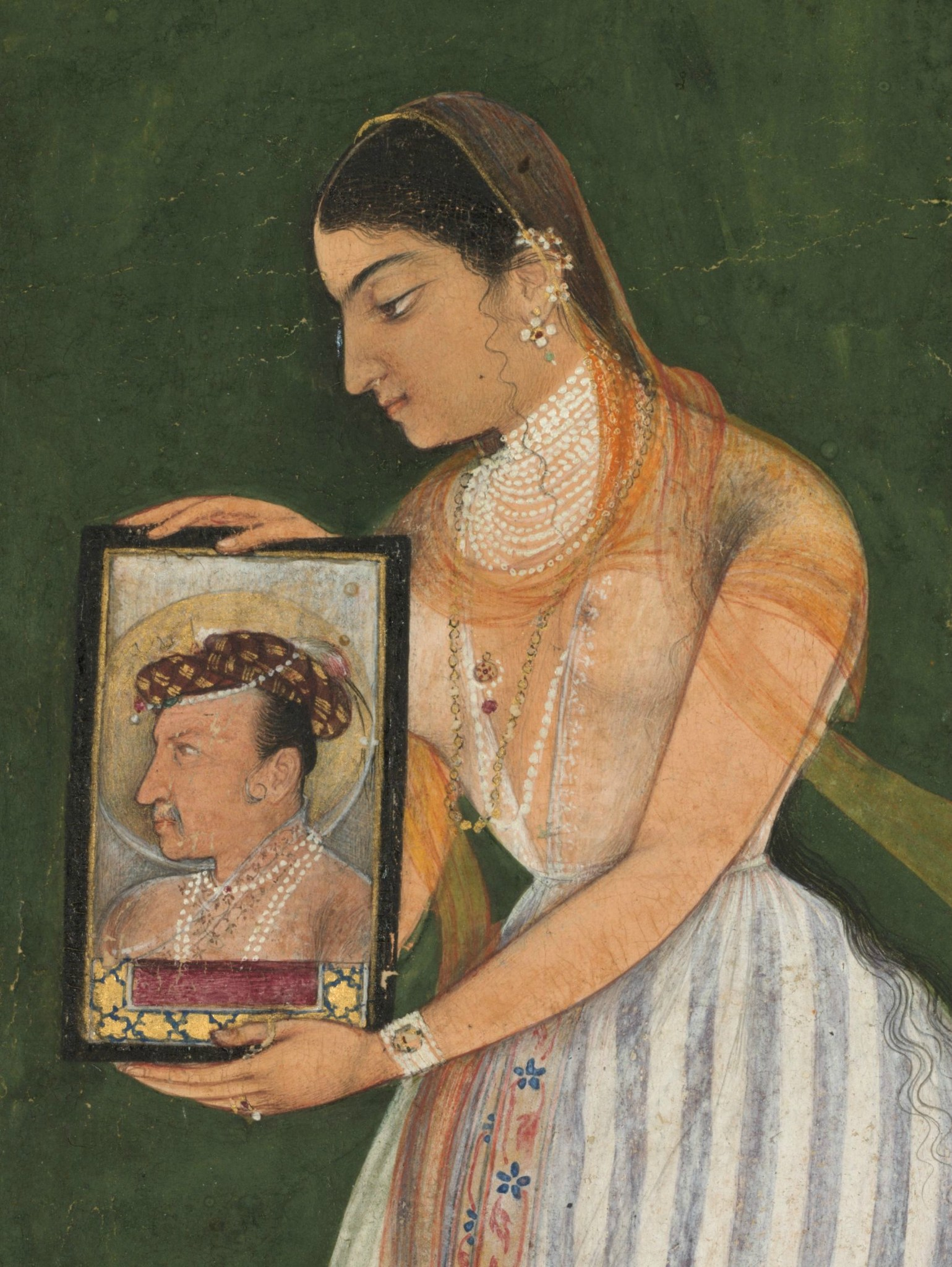
Nur Jahan holding a portrait of Jahangir by Bishandas c.1627

After her husband Sher Afgan was killed in 1607, Nur Jahan and her daughter, Ladli Begum, were summoned to Agra by Jahangir for their protection and acted as lady-in-waiting to the Ruqaiya Sultan Begum, who had been one of the chief wives of the late Emperor Akbar. Given the precarious political connections of Sher Afgan before his death, his family would be in certain danger with him gone from those seeking to avenge Qutbuddin's murder. For her protection, then, Nur Jahan needed to be at the Mughal court in Agra, she was brought back in honour (presumably because of her father's position at court) was clear from her new post with Ruqaiya Sultan Begum.

Nur Jahan served as lady-in-waiting to the Dowager Empress for four years. The Dutch merchant and travel writer Pieter van den Broecke, described their relationship in his Hindustan Chronicle, "This Begum [Ruqaiya] conceived a great affection for Mehr-un-Nissa [Nur Jahan]; she loved her more than others and always kept her in her company."

=== Marriage to Jahangir (1611–1627) ===
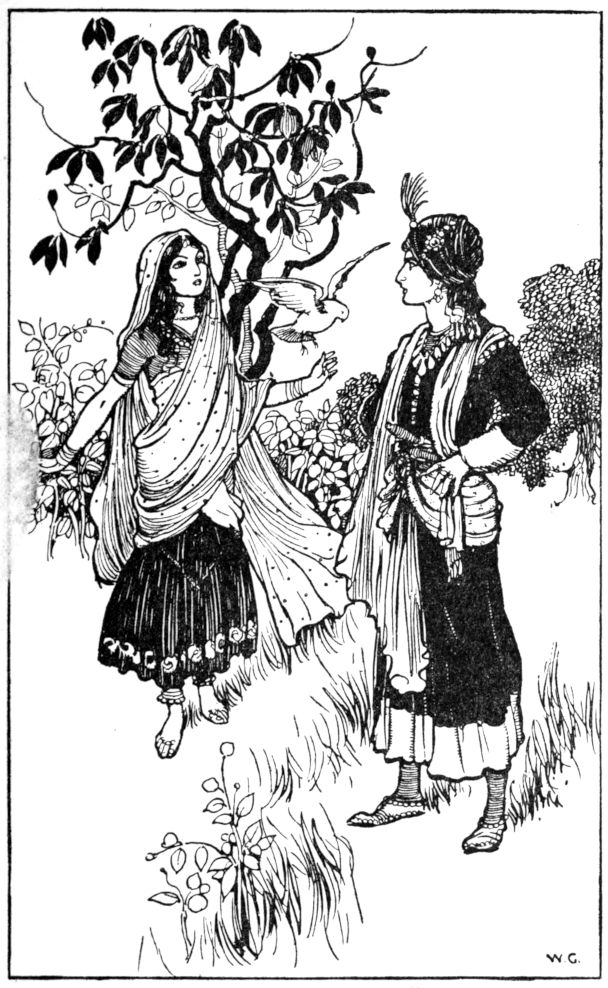
First Meeting of Nur Mahal and Prince Salim

Nur Jahan and Jahangir have been the subject of much interest over the centuries and there are innumerable legends and stories about their relationship. Many stories allege an early affection between Nur Jahan and Emperor Jahangir before Nur Jahan's first marriage in 1594. One variation recounts that they were in love when Nur Jahan was seventeen years old, but their relationship was blocked by Emperor Akbar. However more modern scholarship has led to doubts about the existence of a prior relationship between Nur Jahan and Jahangir.

=== Jahangir's proposal and marriage ===
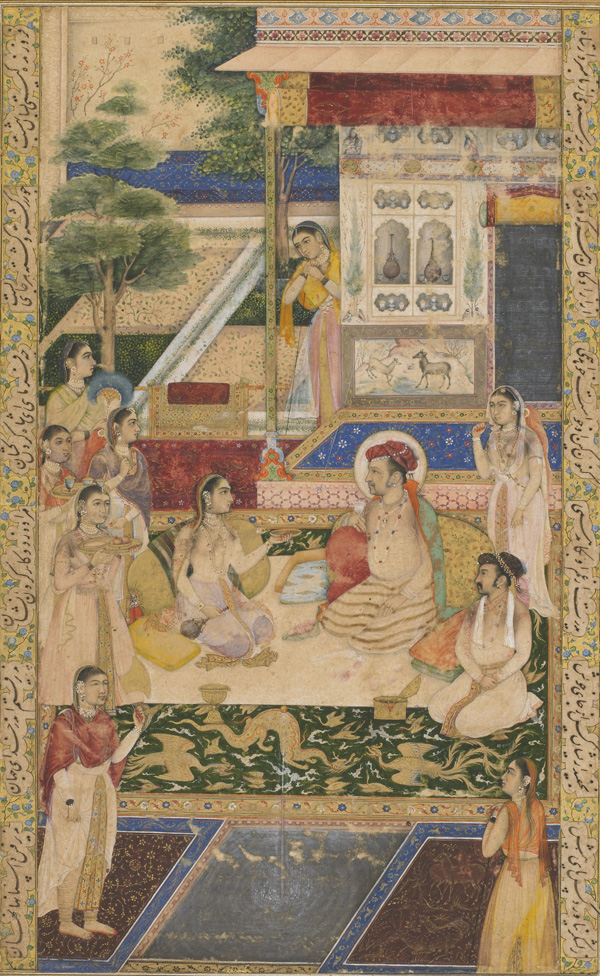
Jahangir and Prince Khurram with Nur Jahan, c. 1624. This scene is probably set in the Aram Bagh, Agra, which the empress Nur Jahan, a great patron of gardens, had re-modeled in 1621.

In 1611, Nur Jahan met Emperor Jahangir at the palace's Meena Bazaar during the spring festival of Nowruz which was celebrated at the coming of the new year, Jahangir fell in love with her and proposed, and they were married on 25 May of the same year (Wednesday, 12th Rabi-ul-Awwal, 1020 AH/ 25 May 1611 AD). Nur Jahan was thirty-four years old at the time of her second marriage and she would be Jahangir's twentieth and last legal wife. According to some accounts they had two children, while others report the couple remained childless. Incomplete records and Jahangir's abundant number of children, obscure efforts to distinguish individual identities and maternity. This confusion is shown by later sources mistakenly identifying Nur Jahan as the mother of Shah Jahan. Jahangir's wife, Jagat Gosain was in reality, Shah Jahan's mother.

Jahangir gave her the title of Nur Mahal (lit. 'Light of the Palace') upon their marriage in 1611 and Nur Jahan (lit. 'Light of the World'). Jahangir's affection and trust in Nur Jahan led to her wielding a great deal of power in affairs of state. Jahangir's addiction to opium and alcohol made it easier for Nur Jahan to exert her influence. His trust in her was so great that he gave her the highest symbol of power and determination of the decrees of the empire – his imperial seal, implying that her perusal and consent were necessary before any document or order received legal validity. So for many years, she wielded imperial power and was recognized as the real force behind the Mughal throne.

Jahangir entrusted her with Shah Jahan and Mumtaz Mahal's second son, Prince Shah Shuja, upon his birth in 1616. This new responsibility was given to her due to her high rank, political clout and Jahangir's affection for her. It was also an honour for the empress as Shuja was a special favourite of his grandfather.

=== Family advancements and consolidating power ===
After Sher Afgan's death, Nur Jahan's family was again in a low position. Her father was at that time, a diwan to an Amir-ul-Umra, not a very high post. In addition, both her father and one of her brothers were surrounded by scandal as the former was accused of embezzlement and the latter of treason. Her fortunes took a turn for the better when she married Jahangir. The Mughal state gave absolute power to the emperor, and those who exercised influence over the emperor gained immense influence and prestige. Nur Jahan was able to convince her husband to pardon her father and appoint him Prime Minister. To consolidate her position and power within the Empire, Nur Jahan placed various members of her family in high positions throughout the court and administrative offices. Her brother Asaf Khan was appointed grand Wazir (minister) to Jahangir.

Furthermore, to ensure her continued connections to the throne and the influence which she could obtain from it, Nur Jahan arranged for her daughter Ladli to marry Jahangir's youngest son, Shahryar. This wedding ensured that one way or another, the influence of Nur Jahan's family would extend over the Mughal Empire for at least another generation.

=== Administration of the Mughal Empire ===
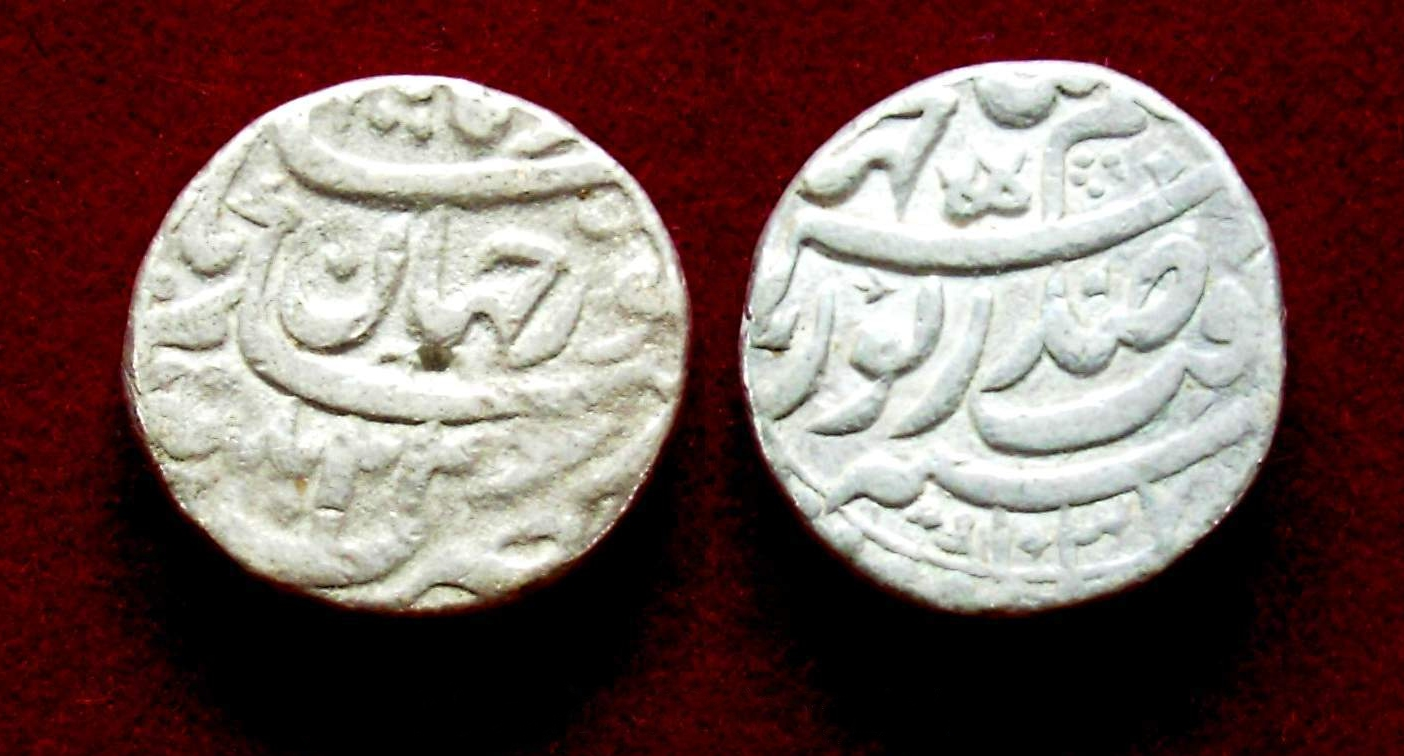
Silver rupee coin minted under Jahangir, bearing the name of Nur Jahan. Dated AH 1037, regnal year 22 (1627/1628 CE), minted at Patna.

Nur Jahan was fond of hunting and often went on hunting tours with her husband and was known for her boldness in hunting ferocious tigers. She is reported to have slain four tigers with six bullets during one hunt. According to Sir Syed Ahmad Khan this feat, inspired a poet to declaim a spontaneous couplet in her honor:

"Though Nur Jahan be in form a woman,
In the ranks of men she's a tiger-slayer"

— Unknown Poet

Nur Jahan's administrative skills proved invaluable during her regency as she defended the Empire's borders in her husband's absence and navigated family feuds, rebel uprisings, and a war of succession brought on by the failure of Jahangir to name an heir before he died on 28 October 1627.

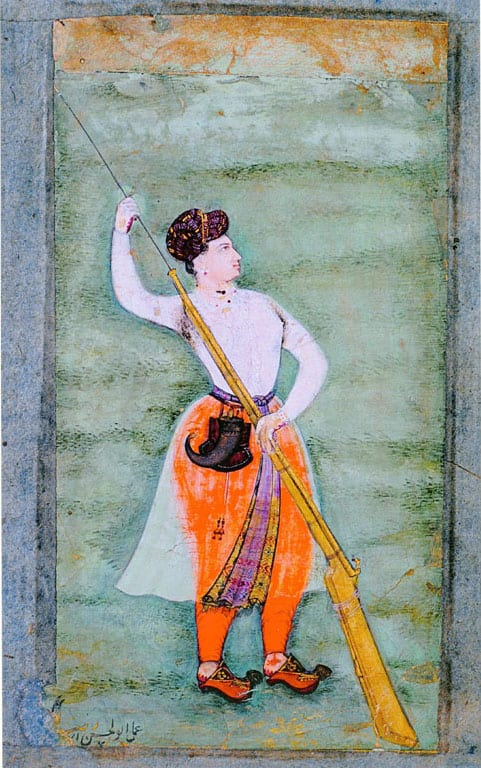
Portrait of Nur Jahan holding a gun by Abu'l-Hasan.

In 1626, Emperor Jahangir was captured by rebels while on his way to Kashmir. The rebel leader Mahabat Khan had hoped to stage a coup against Jahangir. Riding into battle atop a war elephant, Nur Jahan intervened herself to get her husband released. She ordered the ministers to organize an attack on the enemy in order to rescue the Emperor; she would lead one of the units by administering commands from on top of a war elephant. During the battle Nur Jahan's mount was hit and the soldiers of the imperial army fell at her feet. Realizing her plan had failed Nur Jahan surrendered to Mahabat Khan and was placed in captivity with her husband. Unfortunately for the rebels, Mahabat Khan failed to recognize the creativity and intellect of Nur Jahan as she soon was able to organize an escape and raise an army right under his very nose. Shortly after being rescued, Jahangir died on 28 October 1627.

=== Quest for retention of Power ===
In 1620, Nur Jahan, in order to secure her power in the Mughal court after the decline of her husband Jahangir's health, offered the marriage proposal of her daughter to the charismatic Khusrau Mirza with the affirmation of bringing him back to power. He was the first choice of Nur Jahan for the marriage of her daughter, Ladli Begum as he was the favorite of common people who desperately wanted to see him on the throne and was highly backed by the revered people of the Mughal Court owing to his exceptional capabilities and talent. However, the Prince in an effort to uphold the fidelity to his chief wife refused the marriage proposal though his wife begged him to accept the proposal and subsequently, this proposal was passed on to Prince Khurram upon whose refusal it was finally passed to and accepted by Shahryar Mirza.

Tensions between Nur Jahan and Jahangir's third son, the crowned Prince Khurram and future Shah Jahan, had been uneasy from the start. Prince Khurram resented the influence Nur Jahan held over his father and was angered at having to play second fiddle to her favourite Shahryar, his half-brother and her son-in-law. When the Persians besieged Kandahar, Nur Jahan was at the helm of the affairs. She corresponded with Kösem Sultan, the most powerful Valide Sultan and regent of the Ottoman Empire. Nur Jahan attempted, with the support of the Ottomans and the Uzbeks, to form a coalition against the Safavids. However, her efforts did not succeed. She ordered Prince Khurram to march for Kandahar, but he refused. As a result of Prince Khurram's refusal to obey Nur Jahan's orders, Kandahar was lost to the Persians after a forty-five-day siege. Prince Khurram feared that in his absence Nur Jahan would attempt to poison his father against him and convince Jahangir to name Shahryar the heir in his place. This fear brought Prince Khurram to rebel against his father rather than fight against the Persians. In 1622 Prince Khurram raised an army and marched against his father and Nur Jahan. The rebellion was quelled by Jahangir's forces and the prince was forced to surrender unconditionally. Although he was forgiven for his errors in 1626, tensions between Nur Jahan and her stepson would continue to grow underneath the surface.

Jahangir died on 28 October 1627 and his death sparked a war of succession between his remaining sons, Prince Khurram who was proclaimed as Shah Jahan by Jahangir and Prince Shahryar who was backed by Nur Jahan being her son-in-law. Jahangir's eldest son Khusrau had rebelled against the Emperor, was partially blinded as a result and was later killed by Prince Khurram during an uprising in Deccan. Jahangir's second son, Parviz, was weak and addicted to alcohol. Afraid to lose her powers and influence in the Mughal court if Shah Jahan would succeed her husband, she backed her son-in-law, Shahryar Mirza, who she believed could be easily manipulated thus retaining influence in the Mughal court. She wished for her daughter, Ladli Begum, to become Empress after her. During the first half of the war it appeared as though Shahryar and Nur Jahan might turn out to be the victors; however, the two were thwarted by Nur Jahan's brother, Asaf Khan. Asaf Khan, who was also the father of Mumtaz Mahal, sided with Shah Jahan. While Asaf Khan forced Nur Jahan into confinement, Shah Jahan defeated Shahryar's troops and ordered his execution. In 1628, Shah Jahan became the new Mughal emperor.

== Later years and death (1628–1645) ==
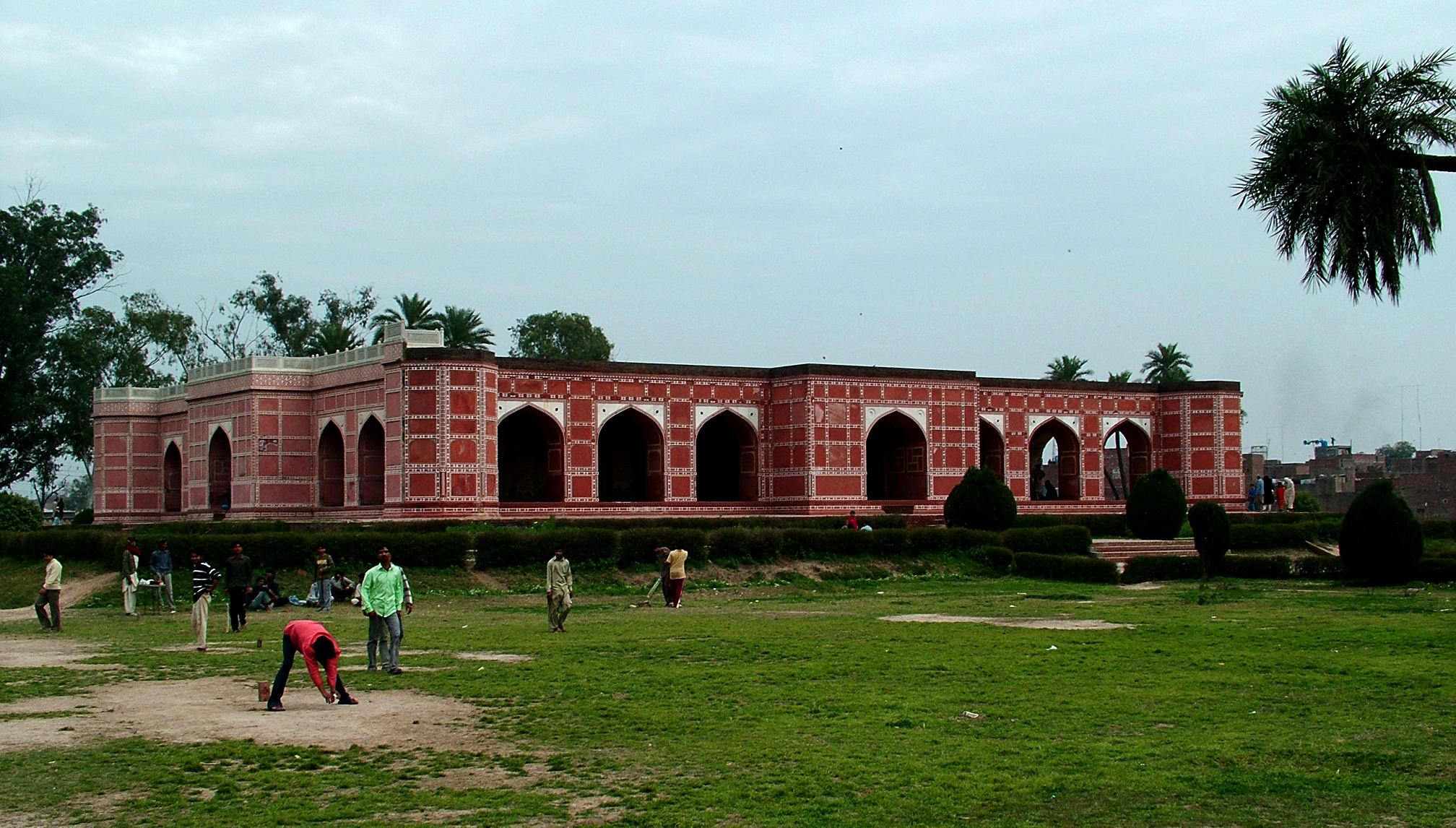
Tomb of Nur Jahan in Shahdara Bagh

Nur Jahan was put under house arrest by her brother on the orders of new Emperor Shah Jahan and spent the remainder of her life confined in Lahore with her young widowed daughter, Ladli Begum, and her granddaughter. The three of them lived a simple and austere life.

She was granted an annual amount of 200,000 rupees by Shah Jahan. During this period she oversaw the completion of her father's mausoleum in Agra, which she started in 1622 and is now known as Itmad-ud-daulah's tomb. The tomb served as the inspiration for the Taj Mahal, unarguably the zenith of Mughal architecture, the construction of which began in 1632 and which Nur Jahan must have heard about before she died. Nur Jahan died on 17 December 1645 at age 68. She is buried at her Tomb of Nur Jahan in Shahdara Bagh in Lahore, which she had built herself. Upon her tomb is inscribed the epitaph "On the grave of this poor stranger, let there be neither lamp nor rose. Let neither butterfly's wing burn nor nightingale sing". Her brother Asaf Khan's tomb is also located nearby. Her daughter, Ladli Begum was buried beside her in her mausoleum after her death.

== Patron of the arts and architecture ==
According to the Dutch traveller Pelaert her patronage of architecture was extensive, as he notes, "She erects very expensive buildings in all directions- "sarais", or halting places for travellers and merchants, and pleasure gardens and palaces such that no one has seen before" (Pelsaert, pp 50). In 1620, Nur Jahan commissioned a large "sarai" in Jalandhar district twenty-five miles southeast of Sultanpur. It was such an important "sarai" that, according to Shujauddin, "'Serai Noor Mahal' in local idiom meant some spacious and important edifice."

=== Tomb of I'timād-ud-Daulah ===
I'timād-ud-Daulah died in January 1622, and his Tomb of I'timād-ud-Daulah has been generally attributed to Nur Jahan. The tomb took six years to finish (1622-1628), and was built at an enormous cost. It was built in I'timād-ud-Daulah's own garden, on the eastern bank of the Yamuna across from Agra. The building is square measuring sixty nine feet on each side, with four octagonal towers rising up one at each corner. The central Vault inside the tomb contain the cenotaphs of I'timād-ud-Daulah and his wife, Nur Jahan's mother Asmat Begum. The walls in the central chamber are decorated with paintings set in deep niches. According to Vincent Smith the pietra dura of I'timād-ud-Daulah's tomb was one of the earliest true examples of the technique in India. Nur Jahan also built the Pattar Masjid at Srinagar, and her own tomb at Lahore.

=== Textiles ===
According to legend, Nur Jahan is purported to have made contributions to almost every type of fine and practical art. In many cases the attributions can be traced back to Khafi Khan, who according to Ellison Banks Findly, "seems to have been in the business of re-creating Nur Jahan's talents and accomplishments beyond all realistic possibility."

Nur Jahan was very creative and had a good fashion sense, and she is credited for many textile materials and dresses like nurmahali dress and fine cloths like Panchtoliya badla (silver-threaded brocade), kinari (silver-threaded lace), etc. Nur Jahan is also credited with popularizing farsh-i-chandani, a style of sandalwood colored carpeting.

== In popular culture ==
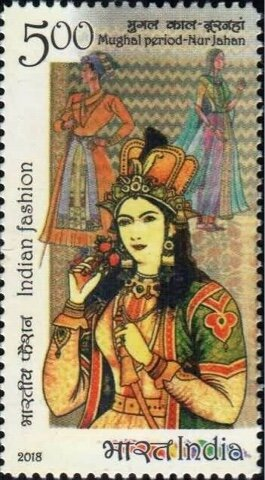
Stamp of India, 2018, depicting Nur Jahan from the "Indian Fashion Through the Centuries" commemorative series.

Literature

- Nur Jahan is The Light of the Haram. in what is termed as a light rhapsody in Thomas Moore's Lalla Rookh (1817).
- Nur Jahan is the subject of Letitia Elizabeth Landon's short sketch A Scene in the Life of Nourmahal. with an illustration by H. Meadows in Heath's Book of Beauty, 1837.
- Nur Jahan is a prominent character in Alex Rutherford's novel The Tainted Throne which is the fourth book of the Empire of the Moghul series.
- Novelist Indu Sundaresan has written three books revolving around the life of Nur Jahan. The Taj Mahal trilogy includes The Twentieth Wife (2002), The Feast of Roses (2003) and Shadow Princess (2010).
- Harold Lamb's historical novel Nur Mahal (1935) is based on the life of Nur Jahan.
- Nur Jahan's Daughter (2005) written by Tanushree Poddar, provides an insight into the life and journey of Nur Jahan from being a widow to the Empress and after, as seen from the perspective of her daughter.
- Nur Jahan is a character in Ruchir Gupta's historical novel Mistress of the Throne (2014, ISBN 978-1-4952-1491-2).
- Nur Jahan is a major character in 1636: Mission to the Mughals, by Eric Flint and Griffin Barber, (2017, ISBN 978-1-4814-8301-8) a volume of the Ring of Fire alternate history hypernovel.
- Nur Jahan is a character in the novel Taj, a Story of Mughal India by Timeri Murari.

Films and Television

- Patience Cooper essayed the role of the empress in the biographical drama film Nurjehan (1923) by J.J. Madan.
- Jillo Bai portrayed Nur Jahan in the 1931 silent movie Noor Jahan.
- Nur Jahan was portrayed by Naseem Banu in Sohrab Modi's film Pukar (1939).
- Nur Jahan was portrayed by Kajjanbai in Kidar Nath Sharma's film Mumtaz Mahal (1944).
- Actress Noor portrayed Empress Nur Jahan in Nandlal Jaswantlal's film Anarkali (1953).
- Mehrunnissa/Nur Jahan was portrayed by actress Veena in M. Sadiq's film Taj Mahal (1963).
- Meena Kumari portrayed Noor Jahan / Meharunnisa in the 1967 movie Noor Jahan, a dream project of Sheikh Mukhtar, directed by M. Sadiq.
- Pooja Batra portrayed Empress Nur Jahan in the 2005 historical film Taj Mahal: An Eternal Love story.
- Gauri Pradhan played the title role of Nur Jahan in the television series Noorjahan which aired on DD National during 2000–2001.
- Siyaasat (2015), a historical drama which aired on The EPIC Channel, depicted the love story of Nur Jahan and Jahangir. It was based on the novel The Twentieth Wife by Indu Sundaresan. Jannat Zubair Rahmani and Charu Shankar portrayed Mehrunnissa/Nur Jahan.
- Sauraseni Maitra portrays the role of Mehrunnisa in the second season of ZEE5's web series Taj: Divided by Blood, while Sauyma Setia portrayed the younger version in the previous season.

== See also ==
- Achabal Gardens
- Serai Nurmahal
- List of Iranian women royalty

== Bibliography ==
- Banks Findly, Ellison (1993). Nur Jahan: Empress of Mughal India. Oxford University Press. ISBN 978-0-19-507488-8.
- Gold, Claudia (2008). Queen, Empress, Concubine: Fifty Women Rulers from Cleopatra to Catherine the Great. London: Quercus. ISBN 978-1-84724-542-7.
- Mahajan, Vidya Dhar (1970). "Jahangir". Muslim Rule in India (5th ed.). Delhi: S. Chand. OCLC 33267592.
- Nath, Renuka (1990). Notable Mughal and Hindu women in the 16th and 17th centuries A.D. New Delhi: Inter-India Publ. ISBN 978-81-210-0241-7.
- Pant, Chandra (1978). Nur Jahan and Her Family. Dandewal Publishing House. OCLC 4638848.
