= Farmaan =

- Based on: Alam Panah by Rafia Manzurul Amin
- Directed by: Lekh Tandon
- Starring: Kanwaljeet Singh, Deepika Deshpande, Navin Nischol, Vineeta Malik, Azam Parwana.
- Country of origin: India
- Original language: Urdu
- No. of episodes: 14

Production
- Producer: Gul Anand

Original release
- Network: DD National

Farmaan (also spelled Farman) is an Indian television show broadcast on DD National in 1994. The show was directed by Lekh Tandon and based on Rafia Amin's novel Alam Panah, set in Hyderabad.

The show's stars included Kanwaljit Singh, Navin Nischol, Raja Bundela, Vineeta Malik, Kalpana Iyer, Neha Sharad and it was the debut serial of Deepika Deshpande Amin & Hyderabadi Actor Azam Parwana (As Nawab Tamkeen Yar Jung).

Faman had 14 episodes, and was re-run on DD National in June 2016, and DD Urdu in June 2014.

== Plot ==
In a former royal family in Hyderabad, India, the elder heir, Azar Nawab (Kanwaljit Singh) was the son of Badi Sarkar (Vineeta Malik), a widow and matriarch. Navin Nischol played painter Waqar Chand, who was the younger brother of Azar's late father (Bade Nawab) but had withdrawn from his family over his career as an artist. Deepika played Aiman Shahab, who joins Badi Sarkar as a general assistant. Aiman lost her mother when she was young, and her father around her graduation. She lived with an aunt in Bangalore and joined Badi Sarkar's mansion named Farmaan, in Hyderabad, for work.

Badi Sarkar's step sister was Tasneem Pasha (Kalpana Iyer), a widow with two children: Shahana (Neha Sharad) and Basharat Nawab (Raja Bundela). They lived with Badi Sarkar and had a carefree lifestyle earlier in the show. Both Tasneem Pasha and Shahana were being taken for a ride by a dubious character, Mukhtar Nawab. Badi Sarkar disliked Mukhtar, because he had gotten her late husband addicted to gambling, as a result of which he had lost much of fortune. Waqar Chand also lived in a cottage on mansion grounds, but never entered the mansion as a result of a promise made to Bade Nawab.

The story progresses in Hyderabad as well as Dandeli (where Badi Sarkar's family had a timber factory), and shows the changes that take place as the family adapts, adjusts to its lifestyle. It also shows how Aiman finds her footing from a novice assistant to an assured person and finds love.

== Cast ==
- Vineeta Malik as Badi Sarkar
- Kanwaljit Singh as Azar Nawab / Chhote Sarkar
- Deepika Deshpande Amin as Aiman Shahab (credited as Deepika Deshpande)
- Navin Nischol as Waqar Chand
- Kalpana Iyer as Tasneem Pasha
- Raja Bundela as Basharat Nawab
- Neha Sharad as Shahana
