= Nurmahali dress =

Dress designed by Nur Jahan

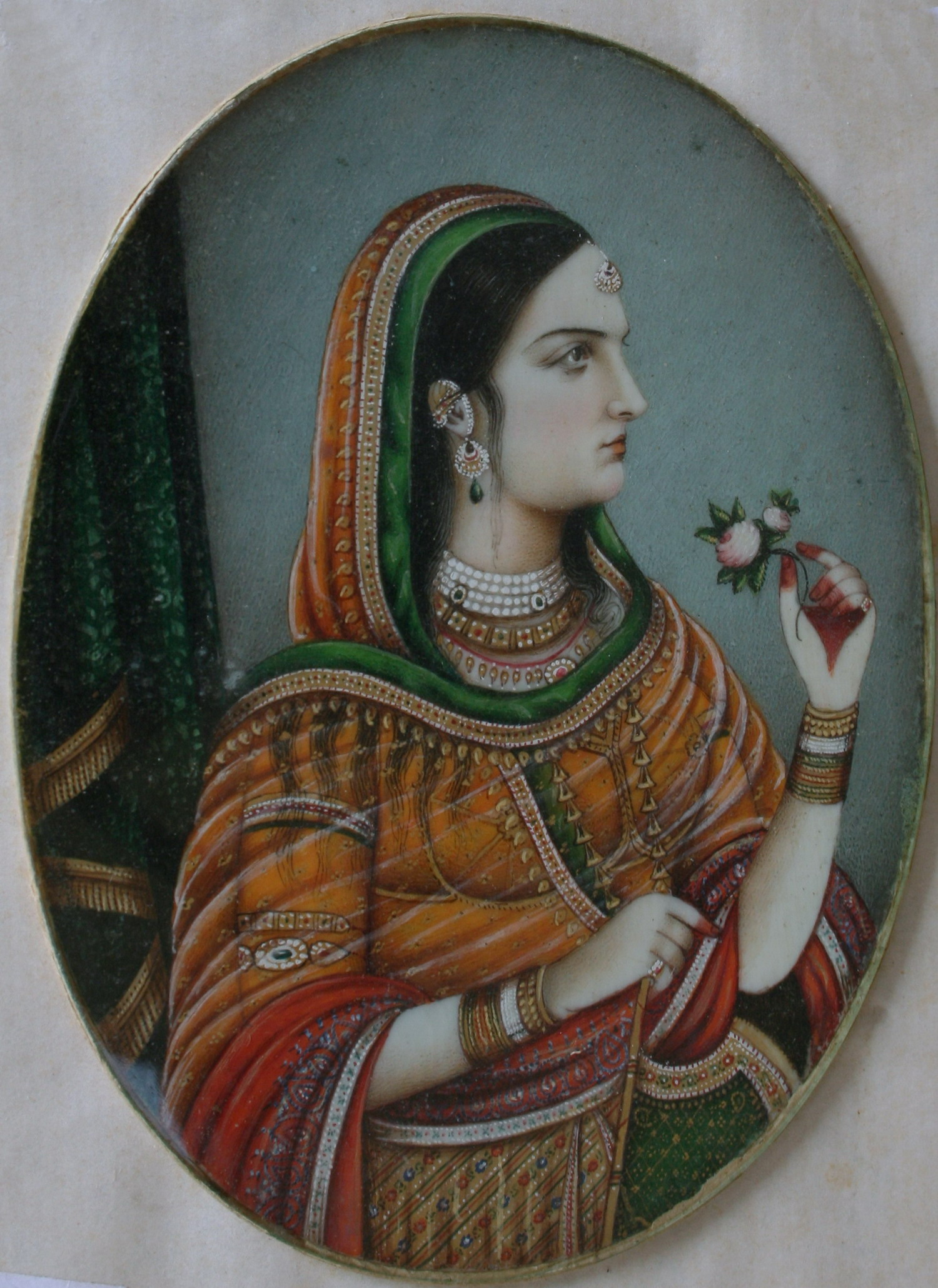
Nur Jahan

Nurmahali dress is an inexpensive wedding dress with brocade, the introduction of which has been attributed to Nur Jahan (1577–1645). She designed many dresses; the Noormahali marriage dress was one of them. The dress was for poor people, a set for bride and brides groom was priced at only 25 rupees. The dress is still in use.

== See also ==
- Mughal clothing
- Farsh-i-chandani
