= Taj Mahal: An Eternal Love Story =

Taj Mahal: An Eternal Love Story!
- Film poster
- Directed by: Akbar Khan
- Written by: Mohafiz Hyder; Akbar Khan; Fatima Meer; Rajeev Mirza
- Produced by: Akbar Khan
- Starring: Kabir Bedi; Zulfi Syed; Sonya Jehan; Manisha Koirala; Arbaaz Khan; Rahil Azam
- Cinematography: R. M. Rao
- Music by: Naushad Ali
- Distributed by: Mashreq Communications Ltd.
- Release date: 18 November 2005
- Running time: 166 minutes
- Country: India
- Language: Hindustani
- Budget: ₹500 million
- Box office: ₹311 million

Taj Mahal: An Eternal Love Story is a 2005 Indian historical drama film directed by Akbar Khan. The film stars Kabir Bedi, Sonya Jehan, Manisha Koirala, Arbaaz Khan, Vaquar Shaikh, Rahil Azam and Pooja Batra in the title roles. The film was released on 18 November in India.

The soundtrack was composed by film composer Naushad Ali, his last work before his death on 5 May 2006.

It was considered the most expensive Indian film at the time, surpassing the budget of Devdas (2002) and costing more than ₹500 million ($11.34 million). The film was released in Pakistan by Eveready Pictures and did record business at the box office. However, the film was a financial failure in India, where it grossed only ₹210 million, bringing its worldwide gross to ₹311 million ($7.1 million).

== Cast ==
- Kabir Bedi as Emperor Shah Jahan (or Prince Khurram)
- Zulfi Syed as Young Prince Khurram (Voiced by Viraj Adhav)
- Sonya Jehan as Arjumand Bano (or Empress Mumtaz Mahal)
- Manisha Koirala as Jahan Ara
- Pooja Batra as Empress Nur Jahan
- Rahil Azam as Prince Shahryar
- Arbaaz Ali Khan as Emperor Jahangir
- Kim Sharma as Ladli Begum
- Vaquar Sheikh as Dara Shikoh
- Arbaaz Khan as Aurangzeb
- Milind Gunaji as Mahabat Khan
- Negar Khan as Princess Kandahari

== Music ==
Taj Mahal: An Eternal Love Story

Soundtrack album by Naushad Ali
- Released: 16 March 2005
- Genre: Feature film soundtrack
- Labels: Times Music; Mashreq Music
- Producer: Akbar Khan

Naushad Ali chronology
Guddu (1995)	Taj Mahal: An Eternal Love Story (2005)

Soundtrack
Review scores
Source	Rating
Smashhits	not rated

Taj Mahal: An Eternal Love Story was the last work of renowned musician Naushad Ali, who died on 5 May 2006. The audio was formally released at a gala in Mumbai at ITC Grand Central Sheraton & Towers, Parel on 16 March 2005 by Times Music in tandem with the home label Mashreq Music. The soundtrack album consists of 8 songs, featuring vocals by Hariharan, Kavita Krishnamurthy, Preeti Uttam and Ajoy Chakraborty, and an instrumental theme. A special edition Double CD, consisting of the soundtrack album and 9 instrumental pieces used as the background score, was also released. This was the first time in India that the background score of a film was released simultaneously with the music release. The lyrics were penned by Naqsh Lyallpuri and Syed Gulrez Rashid.

Disc 1

1. Apni Zulfein Mere – Hariharan
2. Dilruba Dilruba – Hariharan, Preeti Uttam
3. Ishq Ki Daastaan – Kavita Krishnamurthy, Preeti Uttam
4. Mumtaz Tujhe Dekha – Hariharan, Preeti Uttam
5. Taj Mahal – Hariharan, Preeti Uttam
6. Tareefe Meena Bazaar – Instrumental
7. Yeh Kaun Mujhe Yaad Aaya – Ajoy Chakraborty
8. Taj Mahal (Crescendo) – Hariharan, Preeti Uttam

Disc 2

1. Mumtaz's Theme (Part 1) – Instrumental
2. Jehanara's Karavan – Instrumental
3. Khushamdid – Instrumental
4. The Birth & The Death – Instrumental
5. Meena Bazaar – Instrumental
6. The Siege – Instrumental
7. Shah Jehan's Theme – Instrumental
8. Mughal Intrigue – Instrumental
9. Mumtaz's Theme (Part 2) – Instrumental

== Awards and nominations ==
Date of ceremony	Award	Category	Recipient(s) and nominee(s)	Result	Ref.
National Film Awards	14 September 2007	Best Art Direction	C. B. More	Won	
National Film Awards	14 September 2007	Best Costume Design	Anna Singh	Won	

== See also ==
- Taj Mahal (1963 film)
