= Deepika Amin =

Indian film actress

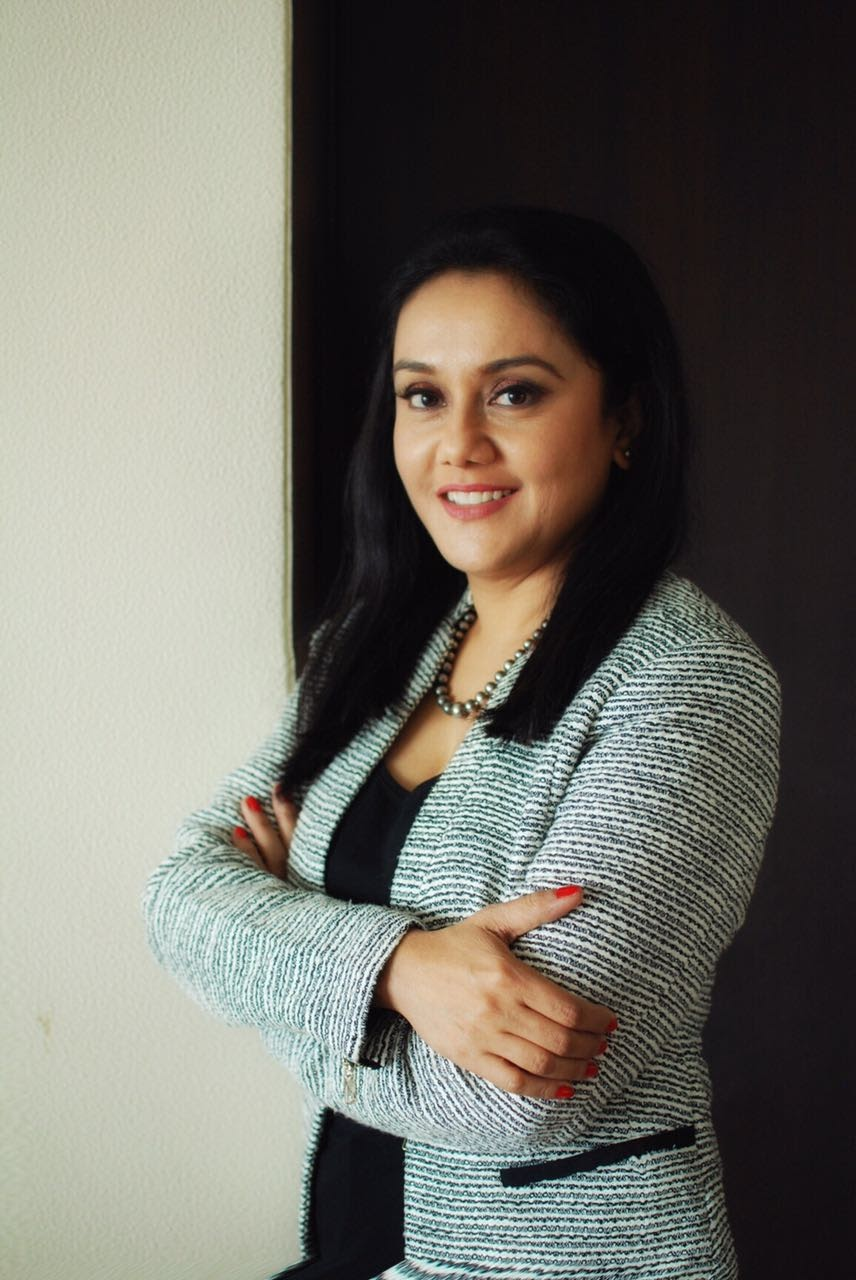
- Amin in 2018
- Born: Deepika Deshpande; 13 September 1967 (age 59); Mumbai, India
- Occupation: Actress
- Years active: 1993-present

Deepika Amin (born Deepika Deshpande) is an Indian actress who appears in Hindi films. She is known for her roles in the films Fan, Raanjhanaa and Humpty Sharma Ki Dulhania. She has also worked in the TV shows Farmaan and Tashn-e-Ishq.

== Early life and education ==
Deepika Amin was born Deepika Deshpande in Mumbai in a Maharashtrian family. Her paternal grandfather was the Sahitya Akademi Award-winning Marathi poet Atmaram Ravaji Deshpande. Her paternal grandmother Kusumavati Deshpande, was a writer of Marathi literature and also a professor of English Literature in Nagpur University.

Her father Ulhas Deshpande was an Air Vice Marshal in Indian Air Force. Her mother Kshama Deshpande is a Kathak dancer and disciple of the Kathak maestro Gopi Krishna.

She grew up in Delhi, attending school in Loreto Convent and studying economics (Hons) in Lady Shri Ram College for Women, Delhi University.

== Personal life ==
She lives with her husband and daughter in Mumbai. She is trained singer in Indian Classical music and also plays the guitar.

== Career ==
=== Television & Web series ===
She got her first break with Lekh Tandon's and Gul Anand's serial Farmaan where she played the lead opposite Kanwaljit. Some of her noted serials are Tashan-e-Ishq and 9 Malabar Hill on Zee TV, Junoon on Doordarshan, Siyasat on Epic.

She was in Shyam Benegal's serial Amravati Ki Kathayein and his 10 part historic series Samvidhaan. She played the role of Empress Ruqaiya Sultan Begum in the critically acclaimed series Siyaasat on Epic channel.

=== Theatre ===
Deepika Amin began her theatre career with plays directed by noted theatre director Barry John - Theatre Action Group. Her other co actors were Shah Rukh Khan and Manoj Bajpayee. She has been a member of Prime Time Theatre Company for many years working in plays directed by Lillete Dubey.

She has acted in plays like Girish Karnad's Boiled Beans on Toast and Wedding Album (directed by Lillete Dubey), Partap Sharma's Sammy, and in musicals like Annie Get Your Gun and South Pacific.

== Filmography ==
=== Films ===
| Year | Film | Role | Notes |
|---|---|---|---|
| 1989 | In Which Annie Gives It Those Ones | Lover Girl | |
| 1995 | Ab Insaf Hoga | Khushboo Prasad | |
| 2009 | Well Done Abba | Lata, Inspector's Wife | |
| 2011 | Padduram | Principal, Mrs Engineer | |
| 2013 | Raanjhanaa | Zoya's Mother | |
| 2013 | Rajjo | Kamladevi | |
| 2014 | Bewakoofiyaan | Rupali Wadhwa (Mohit's Boss) | |
| 2014 | Humpty Sharma Ki Dulhania | Kavya's Mother | |
| 2016 | Fan | Gaurav's mother | |
| 2016 | Rough Book | Bina | |
| 2017 | Dil Jo Na Keh Saka | Karuna Kapoor | |
| 2018 | Sonu Ke Titu Ki Sweety | Mrs. Sharma (Sweety's mother) | |
| 2019 | Gone Kesh | Debashree Dasgupta, Enakshi's mother | |
| 2019 | Mardaani 2 | Dr. Harni Kapur | |
| 2020 | Ghoomketu | Mrs. Badlani | Released on ZEE5 |
| 2021 | Ramprasad Ki Tehrvi | Ramprasad's daughter in law | Released on Netflix |
| 2022 | Tara vs Bilal | Shanno, Bilal Khan's phuphi (Aunt) | Released on Netflix |
| 2023 | Ishq-e-Nadaan | Rekha | Released on JioCinema |
| 2026 | Pati Patni Aur Woh Do | Bhavna Trivedi | |

| Year | Title | Role | Notes |
|---|---|---|---|
| 1993 | Filmi Chakkar | Episode No 21- Sapna | TV series |
| 1993 | Farmaan | Aiman Bibi | TV series |
| 1995 | Amaravati ki Kathayein | Episode 3 – "Saree" – Sitalu | TV series |
| 1996 | Junoon | Vibha, Bobby's girlfriend | TV series |
| 1997 | 9 Malabar Hill | | TV series |
| 2007 | Left Right Left | Mrs. Sahani, Yudi's mother | TV series |
| 2014 | Siyaasat | Empress Ruqaiya Sultan Begum, Akbar's wife | TV series |
| 2014 | Samvidhaan | Smt Renuka Ray | TV Mini-series |
| 2015 | Tashan-E-Ishq | Usha Sarna | TV series |
| 2017-2022 | What the Folks (S1-S4) | Sudha Sharma | Web series |
| 2018 | The Family Vacation | Mrs. Chopra (Rohini's mother) | |
| 2021 | Murder Meri Jaan | Mrs. Mrishra (Aditya's Mother) | Hotstar Quix Show |
| 2023 | The Family Vacation (Season-3) | Mrs. Chopra (Rohini's mother) | |
| 2023 | Jaanbaaz Hindustan Ke | Sumithra (Kavya's mother) | ZEE5 Web Series |
| 2025 | Bada Naam Karenge | Madhu Gupta (Surbhi's mother) | SonyLIV |
