= Noor Jehan (film) =

1967 film

- Poster
- Directed by: M. Sadiq
- Produced by: Sheikh Mukhtar
- Starring: Meena Kumari; Pradeep Kumar
- Cinematography: V. Avdhut
- Edited by: Waman Rao
- Music by: Roshan
- Release date: 1967
- Running time: 140 mins
- Language: Hindustani

Noor Jehan is a 1967 Bollywood film produced by Sheikh Mukhtar and directed by Mohammed Sadiq.

It features Meena Kumari, Pradeep Kumar, Helen and Lalita Pawar. The film depicts the life of Nur Jahan, the twentieth (and final) wife of the Mughal emperor Jahangir.

Roshan was the film's music director, with the soundtrack featuring songs such as "Aap Jabse Qareeb Aaye Hain," sung by Mohammed Rafi and Asha Bhosle, and "Sharaabi Sharaabi," sung by Suman Kalyanpur.

== Plot ==
When Akbar the Great learned that his beloved son Prince Salim had turned a rebel, he was shocked. Akbar decided to crush the rebellion and the whole nation grieved. Emotion & duty crossed swords. Akbar's prestige, mother's love and grandmother's affection battled with the sublime love of Salim. Love blossomed stealthily between Salim and Meherunissa. And as the time passed on, it knew no bounds. For Salim and Meherunissa, love was a many pleasured thing. But the world is more cruel than one can think of. And the cruel hands of courtiers created a wide gap between the lovers. Salim was sent to Gujarat to suppress the rebellion of Pathans. Meherunissa was married to Sher Afghan. But it did not end there, Sher Afghan had dreams of a grand empire for himself. Prince Salim became emperor Jahangir after his father's death. Jahangir ruled wisely but was madly in love with Meherunissa. Sher Afghan met the fate of many over-ambitious generals. He was killed. Mehrunissa accused Jehangir, the apostle of justice, for this ghastly deed. The apostle of justice had to face the trail. And the justice was done! It was the justice of Jehangir, it was the justice of God!

== Cast ==
- Meena Kumari as Noor Jehan
- Pradeep Kumar as Prince Salim
- Rehman as Emperor Akbar
- Lalita Pawar
- Nigar Sultana
- Johnny Walker
- Mukri
- Helen
- Veena
- Tun Tun
- Murad
- Sheikh Mukhtar as Ali Quli Khan/Sher Afghan Khan
- Sohrab Modi

== Awards ==
- 1968 - Won Filmfare award for Best Art Direction - A. A. Majid

== Soundtrack ==
Noor Jehan

Soundtrack album by Roshan
- Recorded: Unknown
- Genre: Film soundtrack
- Producer: Sheikh Mukhtar

Roshan chronology
Bahu Begum (1967)	Noor Jehan (1967)	Anokhi Raat (1968)

All lyrics are written by Shakeel Badayuni; all music is composed by Roshan

No.	Title	Singer(s)	Length
1.	"Raat Ki Mehfil Sooni Sooni"	Lata Mangeshkar	3:06
2.	"Sharaabi Sharaabi"	Suman Kalyanpur	4:11
3.	"Aayi Waade Bahaarein Le Ke"	Suman Kalyanpur	4:46
4.	"Aap Jabse Qareeb Aaye Hain"	Mohammed Rafi, Asha Bhosle	3:39
5.	"Kisi Se Na Kehna"	Asha Bhosle	3:29
6.	"Wo Mohabbat Wo Wafaein"	Mohammed Rafi	3:27
7.	"Mohabbat Ho Gayi Hai Meray Meherban Ko"	Asha Bhosle	3:12
8.	"Aa Gaya Lab Pe Afsana"	Asha Bhosle, Usha Mangeshkar	5:40
Total length:			31:30
