= Taj: Divided by Blood =

Indian period drama web series

- Genre: Drama; Historical fiction
- Created by: Abhimanyu Singh
- Written by: Dialogues; Ajay Singh
- Screenplay by: William Borthwick; Simon Fantauzzo
- Story by: Christopher Butera, Anand Neelakantan
- Directed by: Ron Scalpello; Vibhu Puri
- Starring: Dharmendra; Naseeruddin Shah; Aditi Rao Hydari; Sandhya Mridul; Rahul Bose; Zarina Wahab; Aashim Gulati; Taaha Shah
- Composers: Music; Ian Arber
- Country of origin: India
- Original languages: Hindi; Urdu
- No. of seasons: 2
- No. of episodes: 18

Production
- Producers: Abhimanyu Singh; Roopali Kadyan
- Cinematography: Simon Temple; Tejal Shetye
- Editors: Irfan Ishak; Ben King; Ruchi Barar
- Production company: Contiloe Pictures

Original release
- Network: ZEE5
- Release: 3 March – 2 June 2023

Taj: Divided by Blood is an Indian period drama streaming television series produced by Contiloe Pictures for ZEE5. The series stars Dharmendra, Naseeruddin Shah, Rahul Bose, Aditi Rao Hydari, Zarina Wahab, Sandhya Mridul, Aashim Gulati and Taaha Shah in primary roles. It is produced by Abhimanyu Singh, Roopali Singh and William Borthwick. The first season premiered on ZEE5 on 3 March 2023. The second season, titled Taj: Reign of Revenge, premiered on 12 May 2023.

== Premise ==
=== Taj: Divided by Blood ===
Set in the 16th century, the story follows Akbar and the war of succession amongst his 3 sons: Salim, Murad, and Daniyal. It is a twisted tale of the struggle for power filled with dangerous politics, poetic beauty, torrid romances, cold treachery, and bloodshed. The show unravels multiple layers of each character in the Mughal dynasty. The series dramatizes the rise and fall of the various generations of the Mughal Empire, showcasing the brutality of the dynasty.

=== Taj Season 2: Reign of Revenge ===
The season charters Salim's journey from being the exiled enemy of the Mughal empire to seeking blood and revenge in an attempt to become the next Emperor. On this dark, dangerous, and destructive path, he is surrounded by enemies from all sides with few allies like his new love interest - Meherunnissa.

== Cast ==
- Dharmendra as Sheikh Salim Chisti
- Naseeruddin Shah as Akbar
  - Aaryama Salim as young Akbar
- Aashim Gulati as Salim/Jahangir
- Aditi Rao Hydari as Anarkali
- Sauraseni Maitra as Mehrunnisa/Nur Jahan
  - Sauyma Setia as young Mehrunnisa
- Rahul Bose as Mirza Muhammad Hakim
- Zarina Wahab as Salima Sultan Begum
- Sandhya Mridul as Jodha Bai
- Taha Shah Badussha as Murad
- Shubham Kumar Mehra as Daniyal Mirza
- Pankaj Saraswat as Abu'l-Fazl ibn Mubarak
- Digambar Prasad as Man Singh I
- Mitansh Lulla as Khurram/Shah Jahan (season-2)
- Jiansh Agarwal as Khusrau Mirza (season-2)
- Suhani Juneja as Arjumand Banu Begum/Mumtaz Mahal
- Rajat Kaul as Abu'l-Hasan Asaf Khan (season-2)
- Akshay Agarwal as Amar Singh I (season-2)
- Rouhallah Quazim as Sher Afgan Khan (season-2)
- Arman Khera as Mahabat Khan (season-2)
- Anushka Luhar as Man Bai/Sha Begum
- Mir Sarwar as Bairam Khan
- Tanvi Negi as Jagat Gossain
- ActorsFirdaush as Hakim Hasan (season-2)
- Janam Raj as Sahib Jamal
- Subodh Bhave as Birbal
- Akshat Mishra as Durjan
- Pawan Chopra as Ghiyas Beg
- Padma Damodaran as Ruqaiya Sultan Begum
- Shivani Tanksale as Bakht-un-Nissa Begum
- Aayam Mehta as Badayuni
- Deepraj Rana as Maharana Pratap
- Zachary Coffin as Father Monserrate
- Saurabh Selwal as young Asaf Khan

== Series overview ==
Series	Title	Episodes	Originally released
1	Taj: Divided by Blood	10	3 March 2023
2	Taj Season 2: Reign of Revenge	8	12 May 2023

=== Episodes ===
==== Taj: Divided by Blood ====
No.	Title	Directed by	Written by	Original release date
1	"Succession"	Ronald Scalpello	William Borthwick; Simon Fantauzzo	3 March 2023
After a few decades of conquering Chittorgarh and witnessing the prophecy of saint Salim Chisti almost coming true, Akbar decides to change the rules of succession to the Mughal throne. Who among his sons will prove worthy of the crown?
2	"The Battle of Kabul"	Ronald Scalpello	William Borthwick; Simon Fantauzzo	3 March 2023
Ready to teach his brother a lesson, Akbar decides to wage a war in Kabul. He arranges a horse-taming competition to choose the right heir to lead his army, and hopes Salim will win.
3	"A Message from God"	Ronald Scalpello	William Borthwick; Simon Fantauzzo	3 March 2023
The celebrations of winning the Kabul war turn into a brawl among the three brothers, and Akbar is infuriated. He visualises himself as a messenger of God in a dream and announces a new religion, Din-I-Ilahi.
4	"May His Glory Be Glorified"	Ronald Scalpello	William Borthwick; Simon Fantauzzo	3 March 2023
The announcement of the new religion disrupts the balance in the state. After Akbar escapes a vicious attack, every prince and queen is questioned. Salim's concubines put him in a spot.
5	"Qubool Hai"	Ronald Scalpello	William Borthwick; Simon Fantauzzo	3 March 2023
Akbar sends Murad and Daniyal to strengthen alliances in the North and orders Salim to get married. Salim agrees to exchange vows under pressure but does something that shocks the court.
6	"Birth of A King"	Ronald Scalpello	William Borthwick; Simon Fantauzzo	3 March 2023
While the princes are battling, Agra gets a new prince - Khusrow - Salim's firstborn son. Murad gets a whiff of Hakim, who has been on the run since the Kabul war. Will the discovery of Hakim's whereabouts expose Daniyal?
7	"Sins of The Father"	Ronald Scalpello	William Borthwick; Simon Fantauzzo	3 March 2023
Murad is chastised by Akbar for getting Hakim in chains. While more brides are arranged to ensure Salim's focus on the matters of the palace, his love for Anarkali makes him walk into Abul Fazl's trap.
8	"How They Sing"	Ronald Scalpello	William Borthwick; Simon Fantauzzo	3 March 2023
The entire palace learns about the secret. The favourite prince is no more a favourite as Abul Fazl wins the game. Salim is forced to go into exile, and Daniyal is left broken.
9	"The Lies They Tell"	Ronald Scalpello	William Borthwick; Simon Fantauzzo	3 March 2023
Anarkali escapes the death sentence. While Akbar wants to go easy on Salim, he ends up making rogue decisions. Salim wants to meet Anarkali, but Daniyal's men capture her.
10	"All That Remains"	Ronald Scalpello	William Borthwick; Simon Fantauzzo	3 March 2023
Daniyal's allies attack Salim. Murad's mysterious death breaks Akbar, who now wants to make the most of what is left.

==== Taj Season 2: Reign of Revenge ====
No.	Title	Directed by	Written by	Original release date
1	"Return of The Bandit Prince"	Vibhu Puri	William Borthwick; Simon Fantauzzo	12 May 2023
It has been 15 years since the war. The Mughal Empire is at peace, yet Akbar is not. He visits Sheikh Salim Chsti for advice. As Daniyal waits for the throne, Prince Salim returns to the court.
2	"A Kingdom of Snakes"	Vibhu Puri	William Borthwick; Simon Fantauzzo	12 May 2023
All camps swing into action to take down the Bandit Prince. Mehrunnisa sets her eyes on Salim and wins Jodha’s favour. Abul Fazl plots against them. Daniyal’s insecurities come to the fore..
3	"The Hunt"	Vibhu Puri	William Borthwick; Simon Fantauzzo	12 May 2023
Akbar organises a hunt in the hopes of reuniting the family. Salim wins favour in the kingdom with the help of Mehrunissa. A surprise visitor poses a threat to Salim.
4	"Rise of the Sultan"	Vibhu Puri	William Borthwick; Simon Fantauzzo	12 May 2023
Mehrunissa finds her way into Akbar’s harem while she plans on becoming Salim’s greatest strength. Daniyal summons his allies for a clandestine meeting, and Salim becomes a threat to Akbar’s empire.
5	"Blood Brothers"	Vibhu Puri	William Borthwick; Simon Fantauzzo	2 June 2023
Salim and Akbar are haunted by their past. The kingdom is rife with anticipation about the future as Akbar’s health worsens. Ruqaiya and Abul Fazl plot against Salim, while Daniyal has a surprise visitor.
6	"The Queen Regent"	Vibhu Puri	William Borthwick; Simon Fantauzzo	2 June 2023
Ruqaiya, under the guise of the Queen Regent, devises a scheme to eliminate Salim’s claim to the throne. Mehrunissa manipulates her niece to get close to Khurram, while Abul Fazl's arrogance leads to his downfall.
7	"The Whisper of Death"	Vibhu Puri	William Borthwick; Simon Fantauzzo	2 June 2023
Amidst Akbar’s ailing health, the uncertainty about the heir to the throne looms large over the kingdom. Paying heed to his mother and son's requests, Salim returns to the kingdom and marries Mehrunissa. Khurram helps Akbar and Salim unite.
8	"The Crown of Thorns"	Vibhu Puri	William Borthwick; Simon Fantauzzo	2 June 2023
Salim is declared the rightful heir to the throne. Akbar’s last rites are marred by bloodshed and chaos. As he ascends the throne, Salim transforms into the self-centred Jehangir. Khurram and Arjumand elope marking the beginning of a new era.

== Production ==
The show was first announced in 2018.

== Release ==
The first season premiered on ZEE5 on 3 March 2023. The second season premiered on 12 May 2023.

== Promotion ==
The peek into the show was released by Dharmendra, when he shared that he is playing Sheikh Salim Chisti in this show. The logo was unveiled at a ceremony in Mumbai on 14 February. Subsequently, the trailer was launched on 17 February. The second season was announced with a trailer on 23 April 2023.

== Reception ==
It received mostly positive reviews with praise for its performances (especially Shah's), screenplay, dialogues and criticism for its visual effects.

Shubhra Gupta of The Indian Express wrote "From the fifth episode on, you can see the series lose steam. The writing, which had kept us engaged till then, starts getting repetitive, which leads to the flaws which we had managed to ignore demanding our attention." Syed Firdaus Ashraf of Rediff.com rated 1.5/5 stars and wrote "Naseeruddin Shah, who plays Akbar, looks thoroughly disinterested as if he is only playing the part for a hefty fee. Rahul Bose is a complete misfit playing the jihadi Mirza Muhammad Hakim South Mumbai style. Aditi Rao Hydari as Anarkali looks lost and is unconvincing in her love for Salim."

Saibal Chatterjee of NDTV rated the series 2.5 stars out of 5 and wrote "Taj: Divided by Blood is crafted with diligence. Parts of the show are informed with enough drama and intrigue to perk things up. It, however, frequently feels a touch strained and repetitive. It is neither Mughal-e-Azam nor Game of Thrones."

Shilajit Mitra for The Hindu wrote "We get a mammoth battle sequence in Kabul near the start. Though immensely staged, it bored me to bits with its obvious choreography (first the archers come on, then the infantry, then the cannonballs...). Far more memorable, then, is this exchange between Akbar and his ministers, after he announces his plans for ‘Din-I-Illahi’. They look crestfallen until one of them calls for a change in conventional thinking."

Suchandra Bose for The Quint rated 3.5 stars out of 5 and wrote "One of the major pitfalls of the show is its incapacity to dig a little deeper into the characters – Salim is an opium lover with a heart of gold, Jodha (Sandhya Mridul) is a concerned mother, Akbar is a ruthless ruler – their characterization can be condensed in three to four adjectives."
