= Ruqaiya Sultan Begum =

Empress Consort of Akbar (1542–1626)

- Shahzadi of the Mughal Empire; Empress consort of the Mughal Empire
- Born: c. 1542
- Died: January 1626 (aged 84); Agra, Mughal Empire
- Burial: Gardens of Babur (Bagh-e-Babur); Kabul, Afghanistan
- Spouse: Akbar (m. 1556; died 1605)
- House: Timurid dynasty
- Dynasty: Mughal dynasty
- Father: Hindal Mirza
- Mother: Sultanam Begum
- Religion: Sunni Islam

Ruqaiya Sultan Begum (alternatively spelled Ruqayya or Ruqayyah; c. 1542 – January 1626) was the first and chief wife of the third Mughal emperor, Akbar. She was one of the longest-serving Mughal empress consorts for nearly fifty years. However, she never held the title of Padshah Begum. During Akbar's reign, the title was instead held by his mother, Hamida Banu Begum (titled Mariam Makani), until her death in 1604.

Ruqaiya was a first cousin of her husband and was a Mughal princess by birth. Her father, Hindal Mirza, was the youngest brother of Akbar's father, Humayun. She was betrothed to Akbar at the age of nine and married him at 14, but remained childless throughout her marriage. In later years, she raised Akbar and Mariam-uz-Zamani’s grandson, Khurram (the future emperor Shah Jahan).

== Family ==
Family of Akbar and Ruqaiya Sultan Begum

Maham Begum	Babur	Dildar Begum
Hamida Banu Begum	Humayun	Hindal Mirza	Sultanam Begum
Akbar	Ruqaiya Sultan Begum

== Early life ==
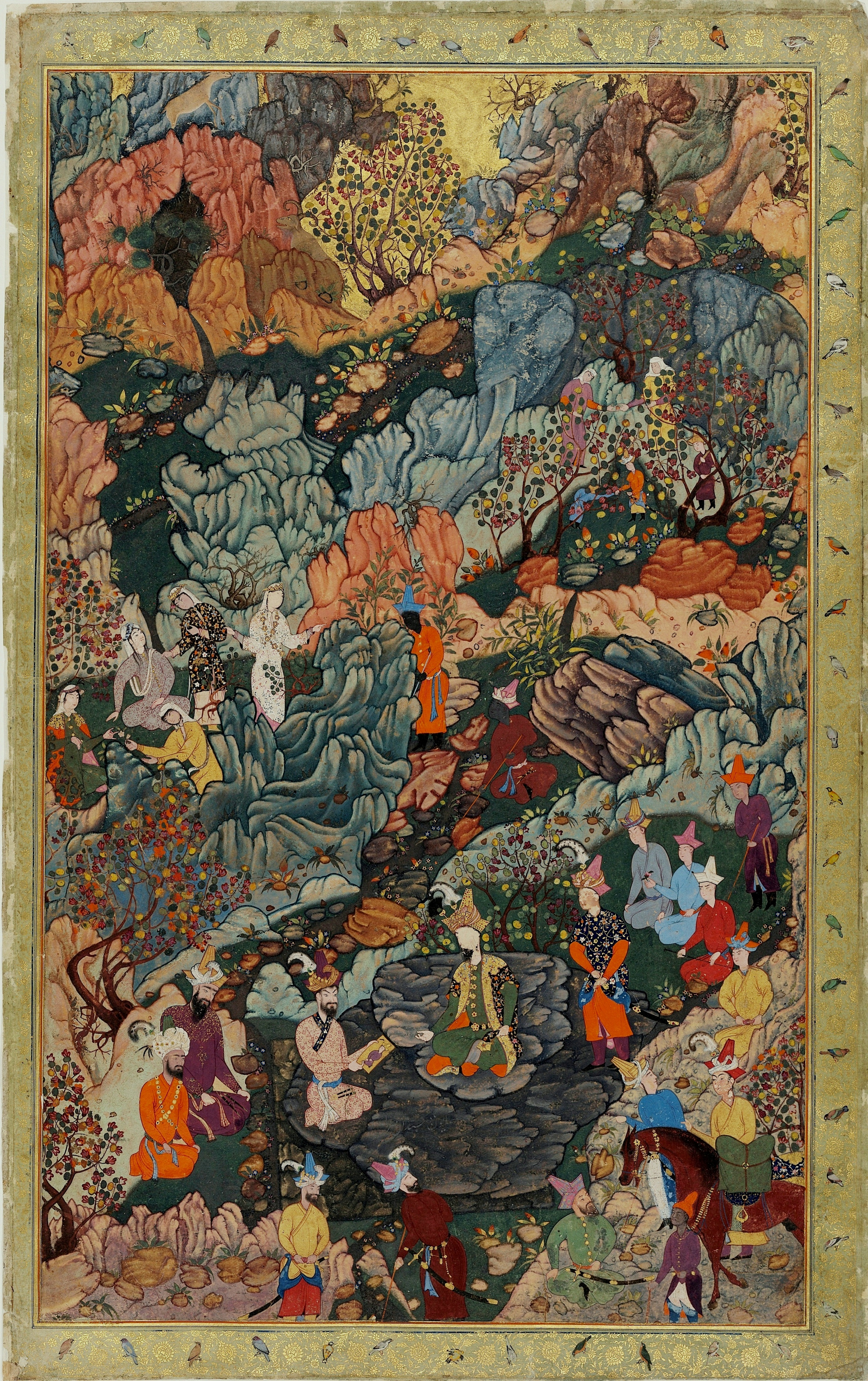
Hindal Mirza presents young Akbar's portrait to Humayun, during Akbar's circumcision celebrations in Kabul, c. 1546 AD.

Ruqaiya Sultan Begum was born into the Timurid dynasty as a Mughal princess, and was the only daughter of Mughal prince Hindal Mirza, the youngest son of the first Mughal emperor Babur from his wife Dildar Begum. Ruqaiya's mother, Sultanam Begum, was the daughter of Muhammad Musa Khwaja and the younger sister of Mahdi Khwaja, who was the brother-in-law of Emperor Babur, being the husband of his sister, Khanzada Begum. Ruqaiya was named after the Islamic prophet Muhammad's daughter, Ruqayyah bint Muhammad.

Ruqaiya's oldest paternal uncle was the second Mughal emperor Humayun (who later became her father-in-law as well), while her most notable paternal aunt was the imperial princess, Gulbadan Begum, the author of Humayun-nama ("Book of Humayun").

Like her husband Akbar, Ruqaiya was a descendant of Timur or Tamerlane the Great through his son Miran Shah.

== Marriage to Akbar ==
On 20 November 1551, Hindal Mirza died fighting valorously for Humayun in a battle against their half-brother, Kamran Mirza's forces. Humayun was overwhelmed with grief upon the death of his youngest brother, who had expiated for his former disobedience by his blood, but his amirs consoled him by saying that his brother was blessed in having thus fallen a martyr in the service of the Emperor.

Following the period of mourning for Hindal Mirza in 1551, Humayun appointed the nine-year-old Akbar as viceroy of Ghazni and transferred to him the followers, estates, military command, and the province of Ghazni that had previously belonged to his late brother. Around the same time, out of affection for the memory of his brother, Humayun arranged a betrothal between Hindal's nine-year-old daughter, Ruqaiya, to his son Akbar. Their marriage was solemnized several years later near Jalandhar, Punjab, when both Akbar and Ruqaiya were about fourteen years old.

During the period of political uncertainty following Humayun's death in 1556, Ruqaiya and the other female members of the imperial family were staying in Kabul. In 1557, Ruqaiya came to the Punjab and joined Akbar, shortly after Sikandar Shah was defeated and had submitted to the Mughals. She was accompanied by her mother-in-law Hamida Banu Begum, her aunt Gulbadan Begum, and many other female members of the imperial family. Ruqaiya's marriage with Akbar was solemnized near Jalandhar, Punjab, when both of them were 14 years old. After resting for about four months in Punjab, the imperial family set out for Delhi. The Mughals were at last ready to settle down in India.

== Life ==
Ruqaiya became Empress of the Mughal Empire at the age of fourteen years following her husband's accession to the throne in 1556. She remained childless throughout her marriage but was entrusted the upbringing of Akbar and Mariam-uz-Zamani's grandson, Prince Khurram (the future emperor Shah Jahan). Jagat Gosain's son Khurram, considered to be auspicious as per his astrological signs was insisted by Akbar to be raised under his care than at Salim's palace and therefore was raised in Akbar's palace. He was placed under the care of Ruqaiya Sultan who resided in Akbar's harem and she is stated to have raised Khurram affectionately.

Jahangir noted in his memoirs that Ruqaiya had loved his son, Khurram, "a thousand times more than if he had been her own [son]." Khurram remained with her until he had turned almost 14. After Akbar died in 1605, the young prince was then, finally, allowed to return to his father's household, and thus, returned to the care of his mother, Jagat Gosain whom he cared for and loved immensely. Khurram in his biography and court chronicles referred to his mother Bilqis Makani with the epithet 'Hazrat'. She also raised Shah Jahan's first daughter, Parhez Banu Begum.

She was one of Akbar's consorts from the time of their marriage in 1557 until his death in 1605. She was Akbar's first wife and a Timurid princess, being the daughter of Mirza Hindal.

Once, Ruqaiya and her mother-in-law, Hamida Banu Begum, by their joint effort could not secure a pardon for a Sunni Muslim who had murdered a Shia in Lahore purely out of religious fanaticism.

In 1607, Jahangir organized a hunting trip to Kabul accompanied by his harem. Ruqaiya during this trip, for the first time paid homage to her father's mausoleum, Hindal Mirza, and later was also buried alongside him at the Gardens of Babur in Kabul. In the same year, Sher Afghan Khan, the jagirdar of Burdwan died and his widowed wife, Mehr-un-Nissa (later Empress Nur Jahan) was summoned to Agra by Jahangir for providing her protection and was a lady in waiting to Ruqaiya Sultan Begum. Given the precarious political connections of Sher Afghan before his death, his family was in great danger and therefore for her protection, Mehr-un-Nissa needed to be at the Mughal court in Agra. As her husband had gone down in ignominy and she could have rightly expected only the worst. Mehr-un-Nissa served as lady-in-waiting to the Ruqaiya Begum for over four years. The relationship that grew up between Ruqaiya and Mehr-un-Nissa appears to have been a tender one. The Dutch merchant and travel writer, Pieter van den Broecke, described their relationship in his Hindustan Chronicle: "This Begum [Ruqaiya] conceived a great affection for Mehr-un-Nissa [Nur Jahan]; she loved her more than others and always kept her in her company."

== Death ==
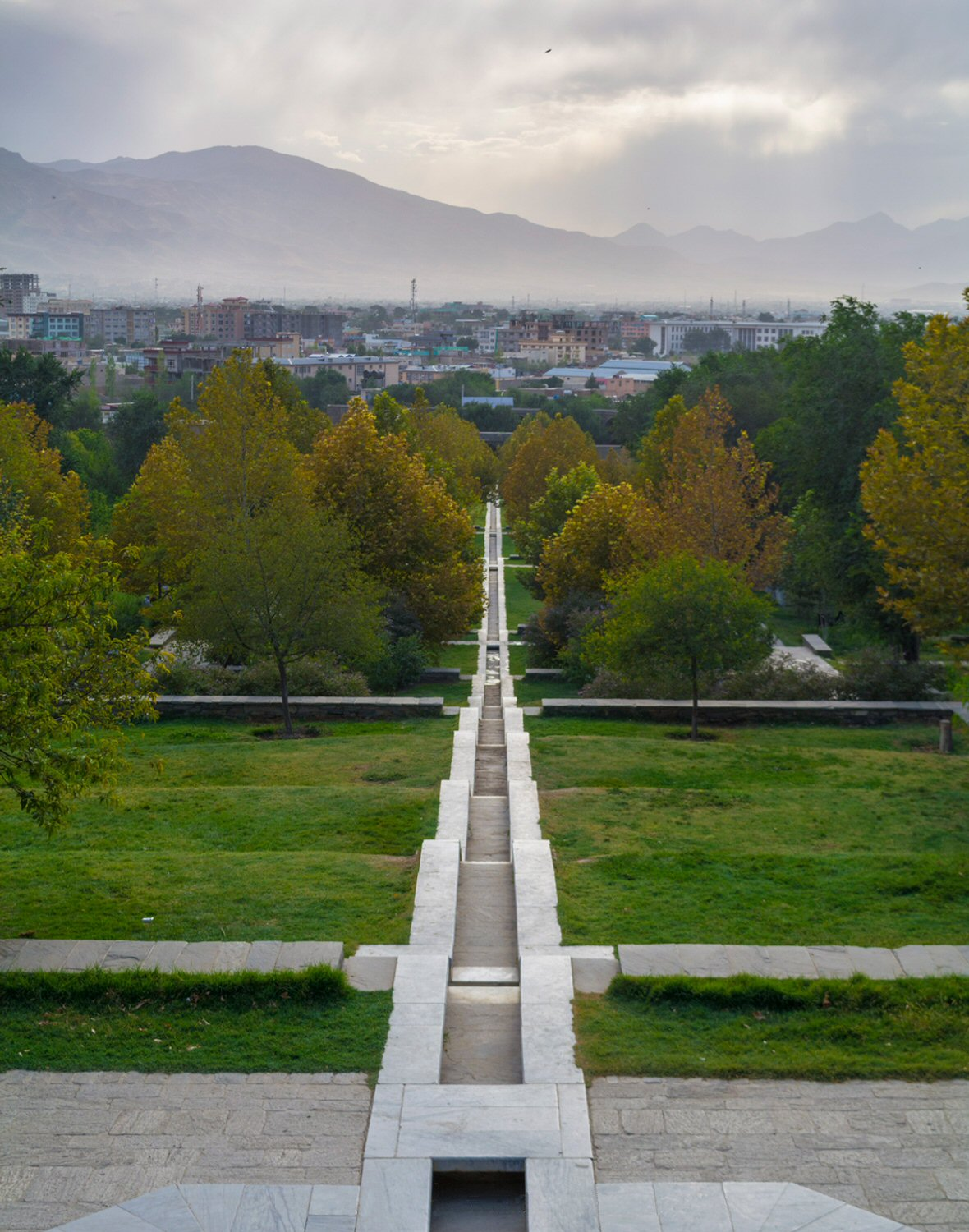
Inside the Gardens of Babur, located in Kabul, Afghanistan

Ruqaiya died in January 1626 in Agra, at the age of eighty-four. She was buried on the fifteenth level in the Gardens of Babur (Bagh-e-Babur) in Kabul, Afghanistan beside the grave of her father Hindal Mirza as per her wish. The Gardens of Babur is the final resting place of her grandfather, Emperor Babur, as well as that of her father, Hindal Mirza.

== In popular culture ==
- Ruqaiya plays an important role in Harold Lamb's historical novel, Nur Mahal (1935).
- Ruqaiya is a principal character in Indu Sundaresan's fictional novel, The Twentieth Wife (2002), as well as in its sequel, The Feast of Roses (2003).
- Ruqaiya is a pivotal character in Tanushree Podder's historical novel, Nur Jahan's Daughter, 2005.
- Ruqaiya was portrayed by Lavina Tandon/Smiley Suri in critically acclaimed Zee TV's fictional drama Jodha Akbar.
- Deepika Amin portrayed Ruqaiya in EPIC channel's fictional drama Siyaasat (based on The Twentieth Wife).
- In Sony TV's historical drama Bharat Ka Veer Putra – Maharana Pratap, Ruqaiya was portrayed by Poorti Agarwal as a teenager and Falaq Naaz as an adult.
- Vaishnavi Rao portrayed Ruqaiya in BIG Magic's historical drama Akbar — Rakht Se Takht Tak Ka Safar.
- Tasneem Sheikh portrayed Ruqaiya in Viacom 18's Colors' fictionalised historical drama, Dastaan-E-Mohabbat: Salim Anarkali.
- Padma Damodaran portrayed Ruqaiya in ZEE5's web series Taj: Divided by Blood.
