= Indu Sundaresan =

Indian-American historical fiction writer

- Born: India
- Education: University of Delaware (MS, MA)
- Occupation: Writer
- Known for: The Taj Trilogy

Indu Sundaresan is an Indian-American author of historical fiction.

== Personal life ==
She was born and raised in India as the daughter of an Indian Air Force pilot, Group Captain R. Sundaresan, who died in a crash while on duty. Her mother's name is Madhuram Sundaresan. The family then moved to Bangalore, where she collected books eagerly. She then migrated to the United States for graduate studies at the University of Delaware. She has an MS in operations research and an MA in economics. She is married and lives in Seattle, Washington with her husband and daughter.

== Career ==
Her first novel The Twentieth Wife is about how a young widow named Mehrunissa, daughter of Persian refugees and wife of an Afghan commander, becomes Empress of the Mughal Empire under the name of Nur Jahan after marrying jahangir.

Her second novel The Feast of Roses is the sequel to The Twentieth Wife and focuses on Nur Jahan exerting authority granted by her husband Jahangir during the sixteen years of her marriage to the emperor.

Shadow Princess is the third novel in the Taj trilogy set after the succession of Shahjahan (Prince Khurram) whose chief queen Mumtaz Mahal dies in childbirth and then their daughter, Jahanara takes centre stage in the politics of the court.

She is also the author of The Splendor of Silence, historical fiction set in a fictional Indian princely state just before Indian independence in 1947. Her work has been translated into some 23 languages worldwide.. Her 2013 novel The Mountain of Light follows the journey of the 186-carat Koh-i-Noor diamond from the Punjab Empire to the British Crown, spanning the period from 1817 to the diamond's transfer to Queen Victoria following the British annexation of Punjab. The novel traces the gem through the hands of Shah Shuja of Afghanistan, Maharajah Ranjit Singh, and the young Maharajah Dalip Singh, and was published by Washington Square Press/Simon & Schuster.

Her short fiction has appeared in The Vincent Brothers Review and on iVillage.com.

== Awards ==
- Washington State Book Award for The Twentieth Wife in 2003.
- Light of India award for Excellence in Literature

== Works ==
Taj Mahal trilogy

- Twentieth Wife (2002)
- The Feast of Roses (2003)
- Shadow Princess (2010)

Other

- The Splendour of Silence (2006)
- In the Convent of Little Flowers (2008)
- The Mountain of Light (2013)
