= Abu'l-Hasan Asaf Khan =

Grand Vizier of the Mughal Empire from 1628 to 1641

Abu'l-Hasan Khan
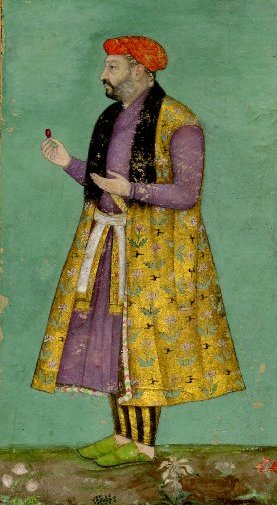
- Portrait of Asaf Khan, c. 1630

Grand Vizier
- In office 1622–1627/1628
- Monarch: Jahangir
- Preceded by: Mirza Ghiyas Beg
- Succeeded by: Wazir Khan

Vakil of the Mughal Empire
- In office 12 May 1611 – 1641
- Monarch: Jahangir

Personal details
- Born: Abu'l-Hasan c. 1569 Safavid Iran
- Died: 12 June 1641 (aged 71–72) Bundi, Ajmer Subah, Mughal India
- Resting place: Tomb of Asif Khan, Lahore
- Spouse: Diwanji Begum
- Children: Shaista Khan; Mirza Bahmanyar; Farrukh Fal; Mumtaz Mahal; Malika Banu Begum; Farzana Begum; Saliha Banu Begum; Malja Banu Begum; Mihr-un-Nissa Begum; Najiba Banu Begum
- Parents: Mirza Ghiyas Beg (father); Asmat Begam (mother)
- Relatives: Muhammad Sharif (brother); Shapur Itiqad Khan (brother); Ibrahim Khan Fath-i-Jang (brother); Nur Jahan (sister); Jahangir (brother-in-law); Shah Jahan (son-in-law); Aurangzeb (Grandson)

Abu'l-Hasan (c. 1569 – 12 June 1641) entitled by the Mughal emperor Jahangir as Itiqad Khan in 1611 and Asaf Khan in 1614, was the Grand Vizier (Prime Minister) of the fourth Mughal emperor Jahangir, a position he held from the time of death of Mirza Ghiyas Beg till the accession of Shah Jahan. He previously served as the vakil (the highest Mughal administrative office) of Jahangir. Asaf Khan is perhaps best known for being the father of Arjumand Banu Begum (better known by her title Mumtaz Mahal), the chief consort of Shah Jahan and the older brother of Empress Nur Jahan, and the maternal grandfather of Emperor Aurangzeb and Dara Shikoh.

== Family ==
Asaf Khan was the son of the Persian noble Mirza Ghias Beg (popularly known by his title of Itimad-ud-Daulah), who served as the Prime minister of the Mughal emperor Jahangir. Ghiyas Beg was a native of Tehran, and was the youngest son of Khvajeh Mohammad-Sharif, a poet and vizier of Mohammad Khan Tekkelu and his son Tatar Soltan, who was the governor of the Safavid province of Khorasan. Asaf Khan's mother, Asmat Begam, was the daughter of Mirza Ala-ud-Daula Aqa Mulla.

Both of Asaf Khan's parents were descendants of illustrious families – Ghias Beg from Muhammad Sharif and Asmat Begam from the Aqa Mulla clan. Asaf Khan's family had come to India impoverished in 1577, when his father, Mirza Ghias Beg, was taken into the service of Emperor Akbar in Agra.

== Marriage ==
In his prime youth, Asaf Khan was married to Diwanji Begum, the daughter of a Persian noble, Khwaja Ghias-ud-din of Qazvin, also entitled Asaf Khan (II). The couple had at least ten children together: three sons, Shaista Khan, Mirza Bahmanyar, and Farrukh Fal, and seven daughters, Arjumand Banu Begum (married to Emperor Shah Jahan and later known as Mumtaz Mahal), Malika Banu Begum (married to Saif Khan Mirza Safi, son of Amanat Khan), Farzana Begum (married to Ja'far Khan Umda-ul-Mulk, son of Sadiq Khan Mir Bakhshi), Saliha Banu Begum (married to Nawazish Khan Mirza Abdul Kafi, son of Khalilullah Khan Yazdi), Malja Banu Begum, Mihr-un-Nissa Begum (married to grand vizier Asad Khan, son of Zufiqar Khan), and Najiba Banu Begum.

== Vakil of state and Governor of Lahore ==
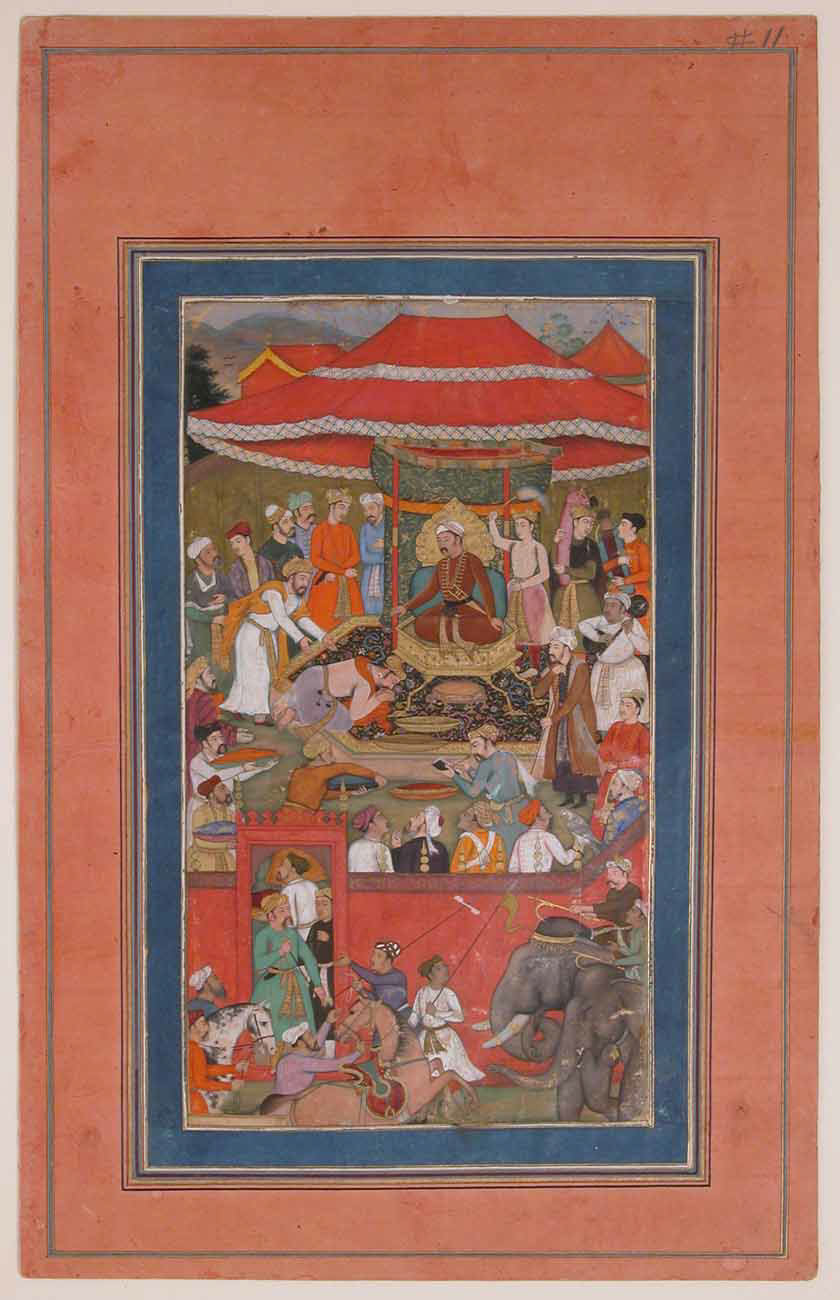
Asif Khan presents offerings

Mirza Abul Hasan Asaf Khan with the influence of his powerful sister Nur Jahan, the wife of Emperor Jahangir, who she at that time held all the power, was appointed as Vakil (highest administrative post) in 1611 and then Governor of Lahore (the temporary capital of that time) by Emperor Jahangir in 1625. After the demise of Jahangir in 1627, he was instrumental in securing the accession of his son-in-law Shah Jahan by colluding with Dawar Bakht (Jahangir's grandson) and defeating the acting emperor Prince Shahryar (Nur Jahan's son-in-law, married to her daughter by her previous marriage to Sher Afgan) in a battle near Lahore. Asaf Khan enjoyed a position even more elevated than in the preceding reign and retained it until 1632, when he failed in the siege of Bijapur, from which time he seems to have lost favour.

== Positions ==
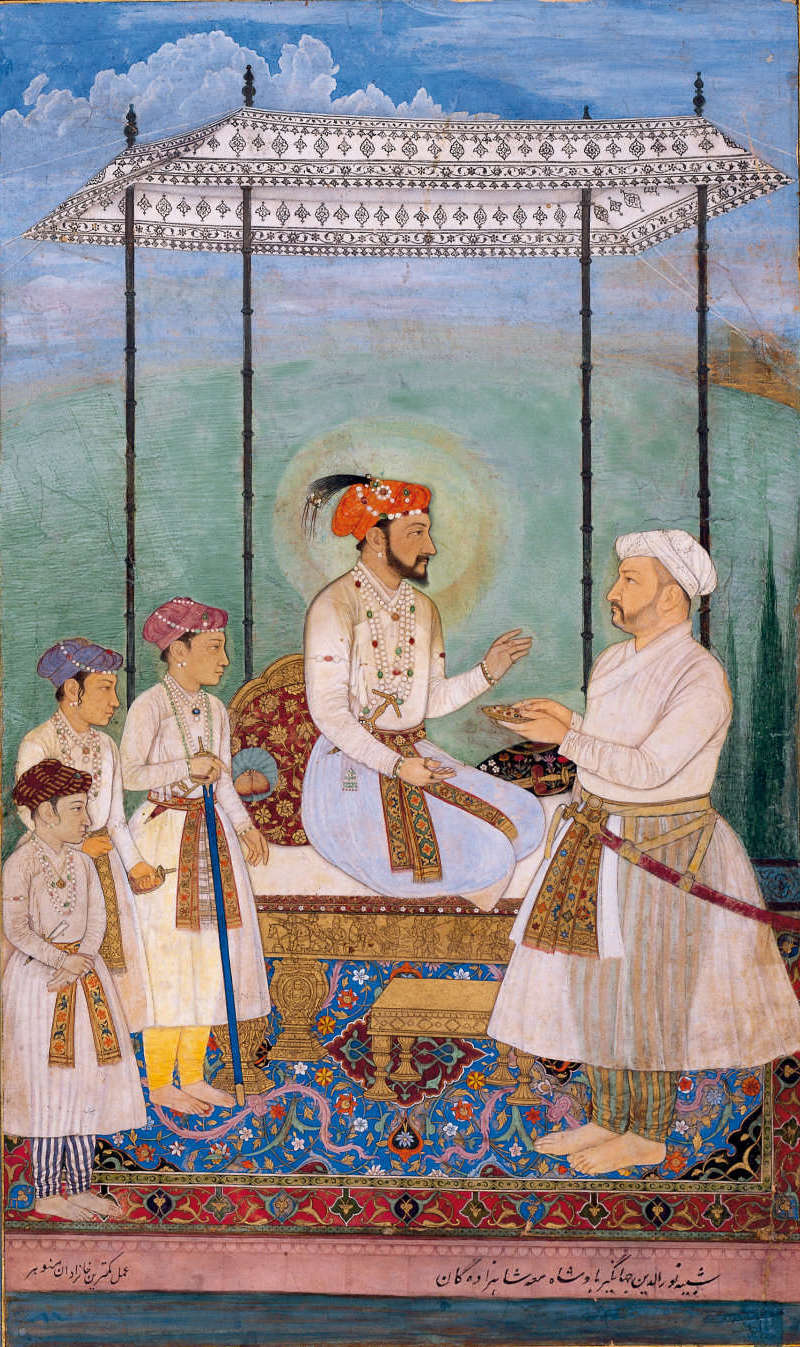
Asaf Khan with Shah Jahan and his sons

- Grand Vizier (Wazir-e-Azam of the Mughal Empire) – (1628–41)
- Subehdar of Lahore (1625–27)
- Subehdar of Gujrat Subah (1630–39)
- Faujdar of Gagron (Malwa Subah) – (1635–41)

== Death and burial place ==
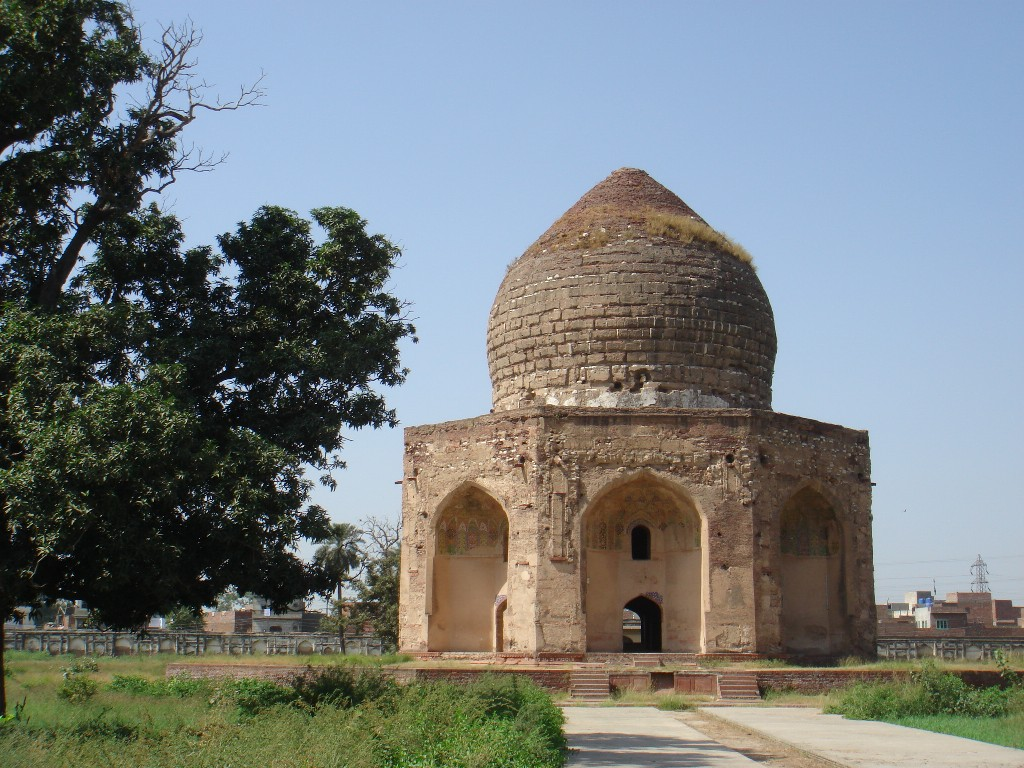
Tomb of Asif Khan in Lahore

Asaf Khan died on 12 June 1641 while engaged in fighting against the forces of rebel Raja Jagat Singh Pathania. Asaf Khan left an immense fortune, in spite of the quarter of a million sterling that his palace at Lahore cost him. His tomb was built in Shahdara Bagh, Lahore, as per Shah Jahan's orders. It lies west of the Tomb of Nur Jahan and adjacent to the Tomb of Jahangir.

== Popular culture ==
=== Films and television ===
- In the 2014 historical drama series Siyaasat aired on The EPIC Channel, he is portrayed by Ravy Sharma.
- In the 2023 ZEE5's web series Taj: Divided by Blood, he is portrayed by Saurabh Selwal.

== See also ==
- Safdarjung

== Sources ==
- Banks Findly, Ellison (11 February 1993). Nur Jahan: Empress of Mughal India. Oxford: Oxford University Press. ISBN 9780195074888.
- Tillotson, Giles (2012). Taj Mahal. Harvard University Press. ISBN 978-0-674-06365-5.
