= Mariam-uz-Zamani =

Empress Consort of Mughal Emperor Akbar

- Empress consort of the Mughal Empire; Empress mother of the Mughal Empire; Rajkumari of Amer
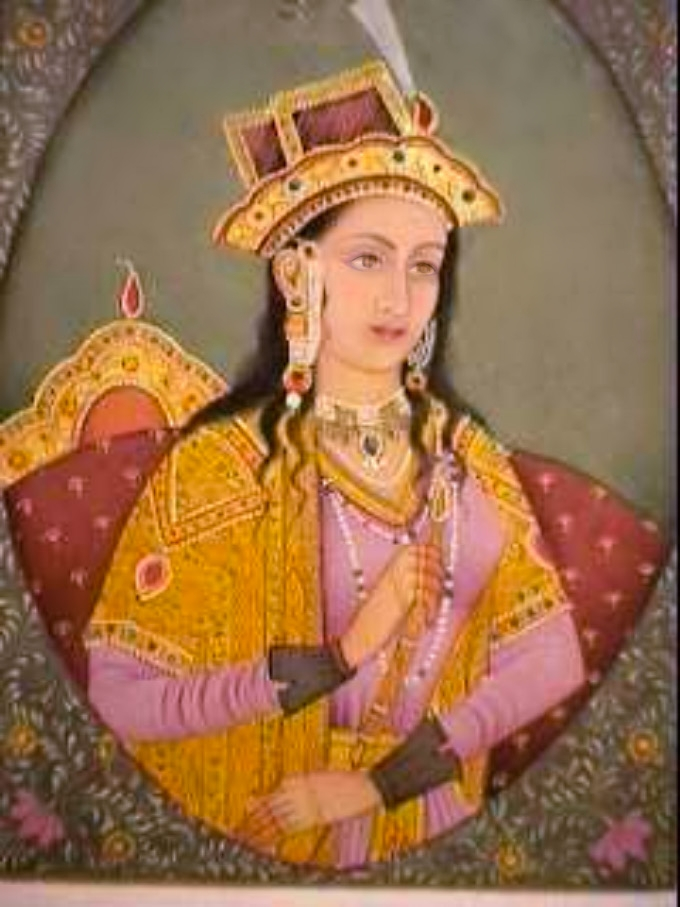
- Artistic depiction of Mariam-uz-Zamani aka Jodha bai
- Born: 1543; Amer, Kingdom of Amber
- Died: 19 May 1623 (aged 80–81); Agra, Agra Subah, Mughal Empire
- Burial: Tomb of Mariam-uz-Zamani, Sikandra, Agra
- Spouse: Akbar (m. 1562; died 1605)
- Issue: Fatima Banu Begum; Hassan Mirza; Hussain Mirza; Jahangir
Names
- Wali Nimat Mariam-uz-Zamani Shahi Begum
- Dynasty: Kachwaha (by birth); Timurid/Moghul (by marriage)
- Father: Raja Bharmal of Amer
- Mother: Rani Champavati Solanki
- Religion: Hinduism

Mariam-uz-Zamani (lit. 'Mary/Compassionate of the Age'; 1543 – 19 May 1623) was the Chief consort and favourite wife of the third Mughal emperor, Akbar, and the mother of his successor, Jahangir. She was Akbar's most influential wife and the longest-serving Hindu empress in the Mughal Empire, for forty-three years.

Born a Rajput princess of the Kachhwaha dynasty, she was the eldest daughter of Raja Bharmal of Amer and married Akbar in 1562 as part of a political alliance between the Mughal Empire and the Amer. Although widely known in popular culture as Jodha Bai, the name is regarded by modern historians as a historical misnomer and does not appear in contemporary Mughal chronicles.

As Akbar's chief consort and later Queen Mother, Mariam-uz-Zamani occupied one of the highest positions in the imperial harem and exercised considerable influence during the reigns of both Akbar and Jahangir. She was among the few Mughal women granted the exceptional privilege of issuing imperial farmans (royal decrees) in her own name, and was the first recorded Mughal woman to engage in overseas trade through her merchant fleets, which also transported Hajj pilgrims to Mecca.

== Early life ==
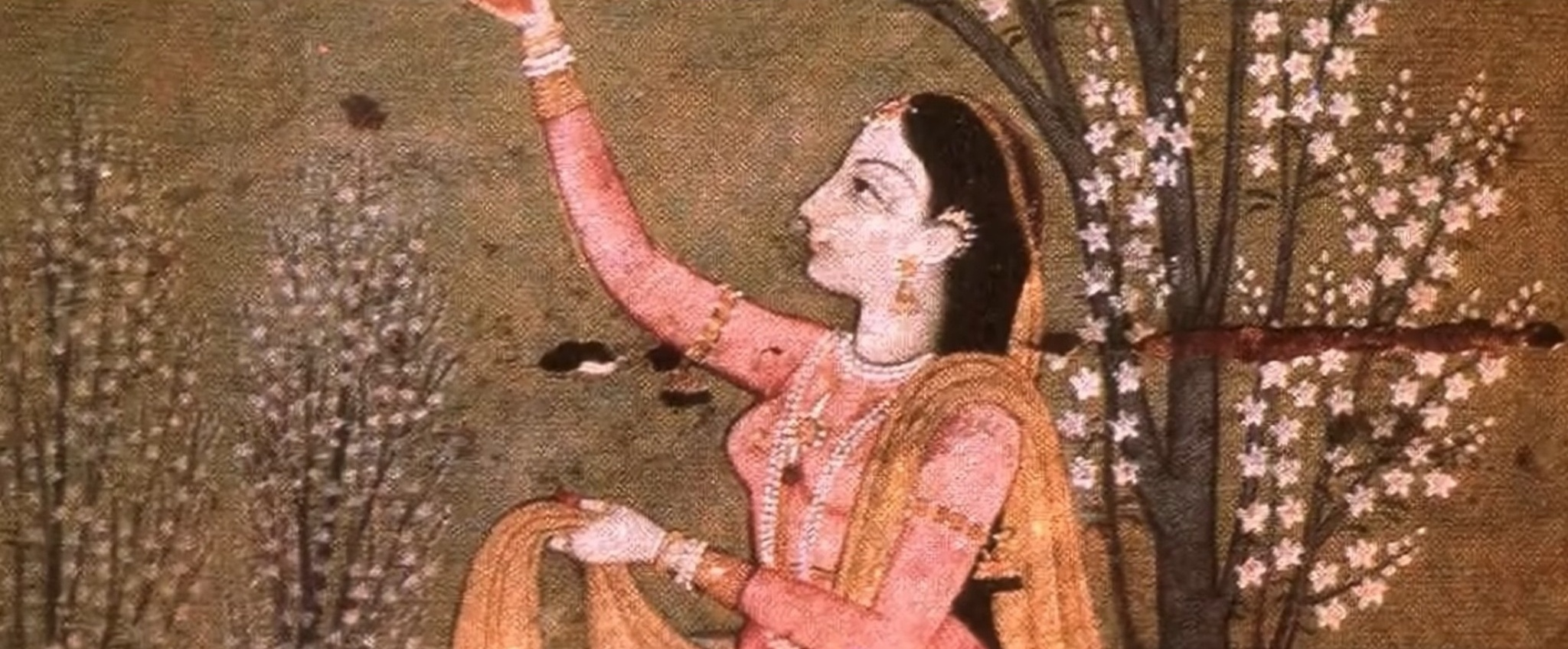
Mariam-uz-Zamani's artistic illustration

Mariam-uz-Zamani was born in 1545 as the eldest daughter of Raja Bharmal of Amer and his chief consort, Rani Champavati, daughter of Rao Ganga of the Solanki clan. Her paternal grandparents were Raja Prithviraj Singh I and Apurva Devi, a daughter of Rao Lunkaran of Bikaner. She belonged to the Kachawa Rajput clan of Amer.

Her personal name is not recorded in contemporary Mughal sources. Later historical traditions and regional genealogies preserve several different names that have been attributed to her. An eighteenth-century genealogy of the Kachwaha clan refers to her as Harkhan Champavati. Other names appearing in later sources include Harkha Bai, Jiya Rani, Maanmati Bai, Harika Bai, Hira Kunwari, Heer Kunwari, Shahi Bai and Shahi Begum.

== Family ==
Family Ancestors of Mariam-uz-Zamani

Prithviraj Singh I	Apurva Devi
Raja Bharmal	Rani Champavati Solanki
Mariam-uz-Zamani

== Marriage and relationship with Akbar ==
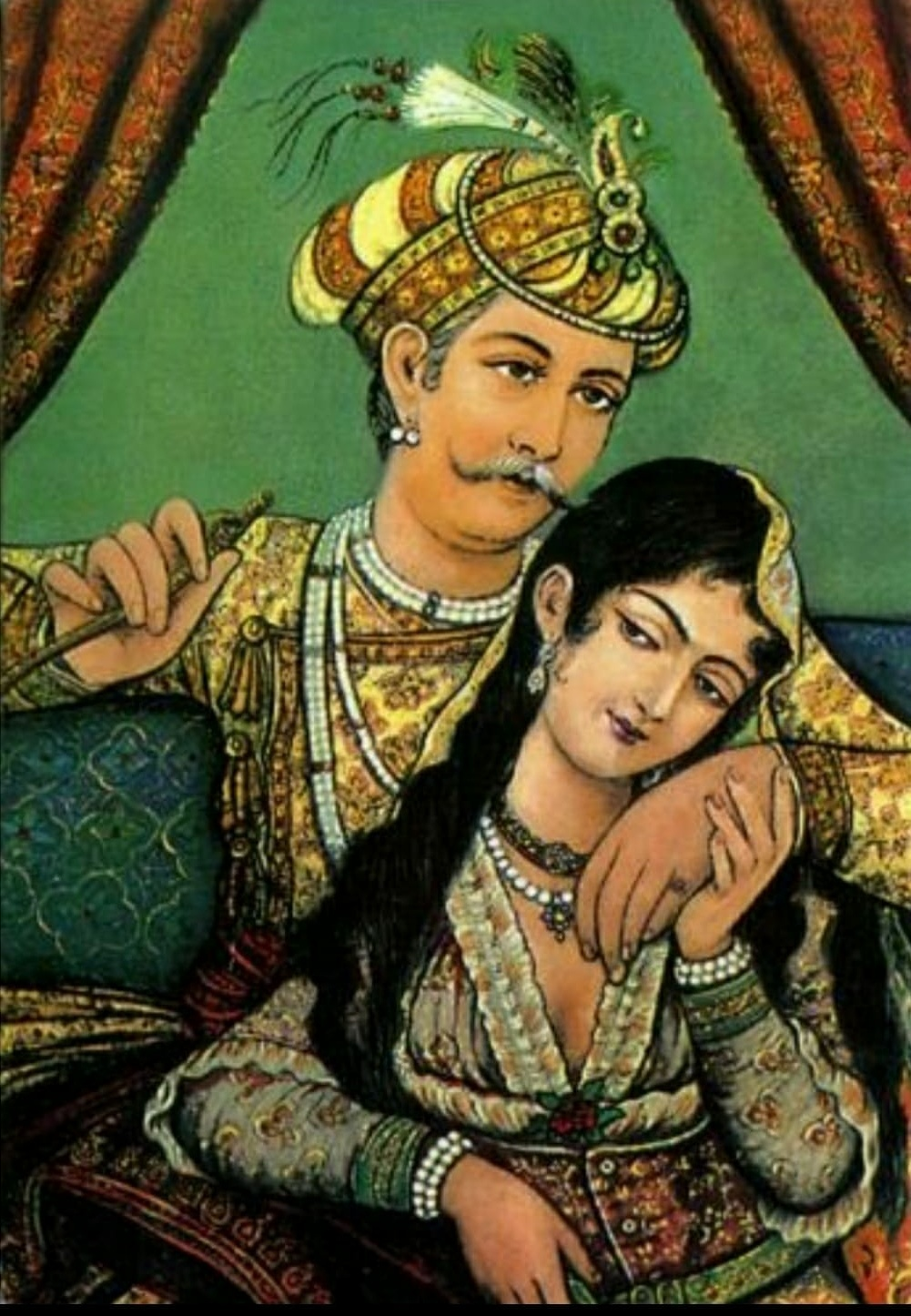
Portrait of Jalaluddin Muhammad Akbar with Mariam-uz-Zamani

Raja Bharmal's decision to marry his daughter to Akbar arose from his conflict with Sharif-ud-din Mirza, the Hakim of Mewat and Akbar's brother-in-law. Bharmal had been subjected to repeated pressure from Sharif-ud-din over his dispute with Sujamal. Although he agreed to pay peshkash and surrendered his son Jagannath, together with his nephews Raj Singh and Khangar, as hostages, Sharif-ud-din continued to threaten his position. Bharmal subsequently sought Akbar's protection. The negotiations culminated in Bharmal's submission to the Mughal emperor and the marriage alliance between Akbar and Bharmal's daughter.

The marriage took place on 6 February 1562 at Akbar's imperial camp in Sambhar, Rajasthan, while the emperor was returning to Agra after visiting the tomb of Moinuddin Chishti in Ajmer. Contemporary Mughal chronicles, including the Akbarnama, Tabaqat-i-Akbari, and Muntakhab-ut-Tawarikh, record the marriage between Akbar and Raja Bharmal's eldest daughter. and refers to her as "the choicest apple from the garden of paradise". According to Abu'l Fazl, Akbar accepted the marriage proposal after experiencing a divine vision during his pilgrimage to Ajmer. The alliance strengthened the relationship between the Mughal court and the ruling house of Amer, securing the Kachhwahas' support for Akbar throughout his reign.

Mariam-uz-Zamani gave birth to the future emperor Prince Salim in 1569, an event that further elevated her position within the imperial household. Muni Lal describes her as one of Akbar's closest companions and argues that she remained an influential presence at court throughout the emperor's life. According to Lal, she became associated with the atmosphere of religious tolerance that developed during Akbar's reign and was frequently consulted by the emperor on important matters.

Two years after their marriage, Akbar bestowed upon her the honorific title Wali Nimat Begum (lit. 'Blessings of God'). Following the birth of their son, Prince Salim, she received the title Mariam-uz-Zamani (lit. 'Mary/Compassionate of the Age'), by which she became known in contemporary Mughal chronicles, including Jahangir's memoir, the Tuzk-e-Jahangiri.

In addition to Mariam-uz-Zamani, she also bore the titles Mallika-e-Muezamma (lit. 'Exalted Empress') and Mallika-e-Hindustan (lit. 'Empress of Hindustan'). Throughout her tenure as empress, she was commonly referred to as Shahi Begum (lit. 'Imperial Consort'),Badayuni 1590a, p. 112 while official records refer to her as Wali Nimat Mariam-uz-Zamani Begum Sahiba.

=== Historical assessments ===
Historian Beni Prasad regarded Akbar's marriage to the daughter of Raja Bharmal as one of the most significant political unions of medieval India. In his view, the alliance marked the beginning of a new phase in Indian politics and secured for successive Mughal emperors the services of several of medieval India's most distinguished Rajput commanders and diplomats.

Dirk Collier likewise considers the marriage a defining moment in the consolidation of the Mughal Empire. While matrimonial alliances between Hindu rulers and Muslim sovereigns were not unprecedented, he notes that Akbar departed from established practice by allowing his Rajput consort to continue practising Hinduism and maintain a shrine within the imperial residence. He further regards the alliance with the Kachhwahas of Amer as a cornerstone of Mughal military strength and political cohesion.

J. L. Mehta writes that the marriage strengthened relations between the Mughal court and the ruling house of Amer. He notes that Akbar subsequently admitted Man Singh into imperial service, elevated Mariam-uz-Zamani to the position of chief consort, and that she went on to exercise a lasting influence on the social and cultural life of the imperial household.

Muni Lal describes the marriage as an important turning point within the Mughal court. He writes that Mariam-uz-Zamani entered the imperial household without being required to convert to Islam and continued to practise her Hindu faith while maintaining a temple within the palace. Lal further argues that she became one of Akbar's closest companions and that her liberal outlook contributed to the changing cultural atmosphere of the imperial court and, in his assessment, to the success of Akbar's reign.

== Birth of children ==
=== Twins son ===
On 19 October 1564, Mariam-uz-Zamani gave birth to twin sons, Mirza Hassan and Mirza Hussain, at Agra. Akbar had returned to Agra on 9 October in anticipation of the birth.

Both infants died within a month of their birth. Hussain died on 29 October 1564, followed by Hassan on 5 November 1564. Following the birth of the twins, Akbar bestowed upon Mariam-uz-Zamani the title Wali Nimat Begum ("Blessing of God").

After the death of the twins, Akbar took Mariam-uz-Zamani with him on campaign. On his return to Agra, he visited the Sufi Sheikh Salim Chisti at Fatehpur Sikri, who is said to have foretold that the imperial couple would later be blessed with three sons who would survive to adulthood.

=== Prince Salim (Crown Prince) ===
A few years before the birth of Prince Salim, Akbar and Mariam-uz-Zamani made a barefoot pilgrimage to the shrine of Ajmer Sharif Dargah to pray for a son.

In 1569, Mariam-uz-Zamani became pregnant again. According to contemporary accounts, Akbar hoped that this child would be the first of the three sons foretold by the Sufi Sheikh Salim Chisti after the death of the imperial couple's twin sons. During the final months of her pregnancy, she was sent to Salim Chishti's residence at Fatehpur Sikri, while Akbar travelled frequently from Agra to visit her. A royal palace, later known as the Rang Mahal, was constructed there for her residence.

According to Jahangir's memoirs, he stopped moving while still in his mother's womb. When informed of this, Akbar vowed that if the child survived, he would never hunt cheetahs on Fridays. Jahangir later wrote that Akbar observed this vow throughout his life and that he himself followed the same practice out of respect for his father.

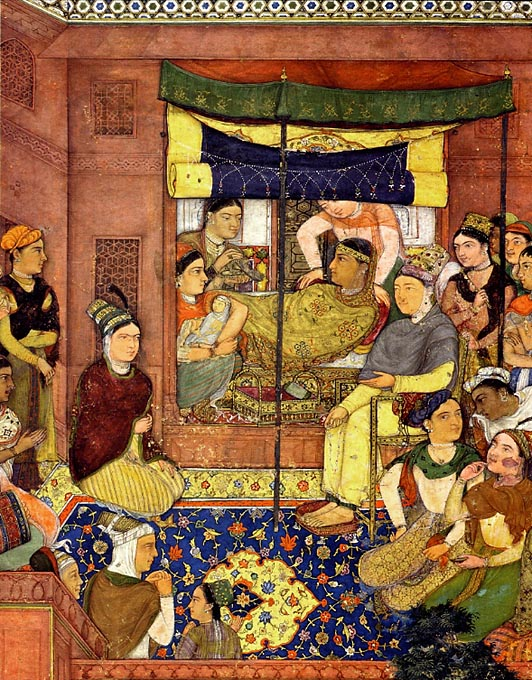
Painting depicting the birth of Prince Salim. Seated beside Mariam-uz-Zamani is Mariam Makani, Salim's paternal grandmother.

On 31 August 1569, Mariam-uz-Zamani gave birth to a son at Fatehpur Sikri. He was named Salim in honour of Salim Chishti, whose prayers Akbar believed had been instrumental in the birth of his heir. The emperor marked the occasion by holding celebrations for seven days, ordering the release of prisoners, and distributing gifts throughout the empire. Although he intended to visit Fatehpur Sikri immediately, his courtiers advised him to postpone the visit in accordance with the contemporary belief that a father should not see the face of his long-awaited son immediately after birth. Akbar eventually visited Mariam-uz-Zamani and the infant prince forty-one days later.

After the birth, Akbar presented Mariam-uz-Zamani with jewellery valued at one lakh gold coins and placed a Rajvanshi pat upon her head. She subsequently received the title Mariam-uz-Zamani. On the same occasion, the ranks of Raja Bhagwant Das and Raja Man Singh were each increased by 2,000 horse, and both were presented with robes of honour ranked immediately below those reserved for members of the imperial family.

== Family advancement ==
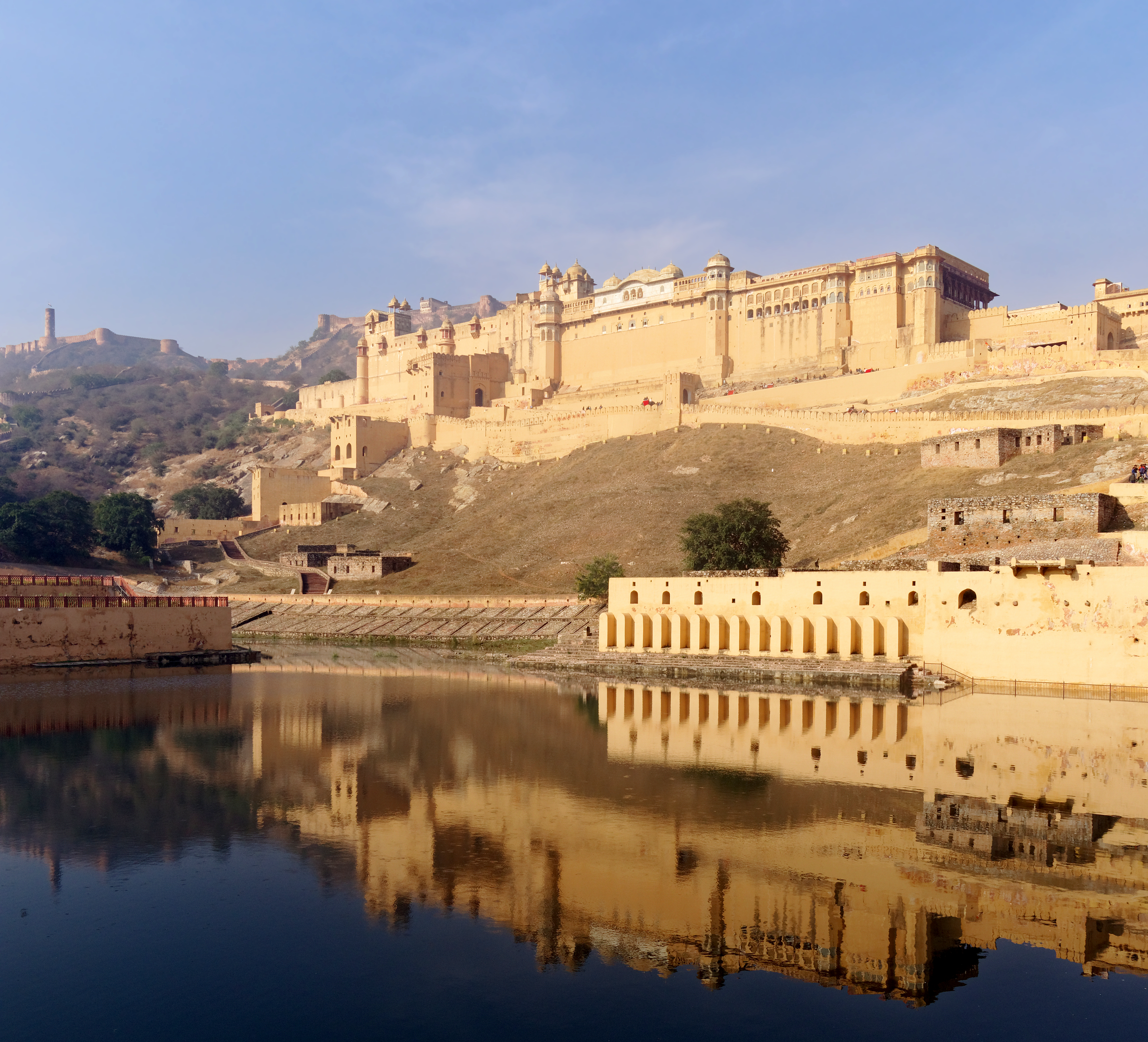
Amber Fort, native home of Mariam-uz-Zamani

Mariam-uz-Zamani's marriage strengthened the position of the Kachhwaha rulers of Amber within the Mughal nobility. Her family became some of the highest-ranking nobles at Akbar's court, while the rulers of Amber emerged among the principal Rajput allies of the Mughal Empire. Of the twenty-seven Rajput mansabdars listed by Abu'l-Fazl, thirteen belonged to the Amber clan, several of whom attained ranks comparable to those of imperial princes.

Following her marriage to Akbar, her father, Raja Bharmal, was appointed commander of 5,000 cavalry, the highest military rank then held by a noble at court. In 1585, her brother Bhagwant Das attained the same rank and received the title Amir-ul-Umra (Chief Noble). Her nephew Man Singh I later became the first noble during Akbar's reign to be promoted to the rank of 7,000, a distinction later shared only with Mirza Aziz Koka. According to Muni Lal, Akbar's exceptionally close relationship with the Amber ruling family was due in no small part to his affection for Mariam-uz-Zamani.

Akbar's respect for the family of Mariam-uz-Zamani was profound. As per Badani, Akbar shared an intimate relationship with the Amer clan. After the death of the fiancé of one of the daughters of Raja Bharmal and younger sister of Mariam-uz-Zamani, Sukanya, in the Battle of Paronkh in October 1562, Akbar personally took responsibility for her marriage to a Rajput clan and adopted her as her own daughter.

Mariam-uz-Zamani also arranged the marriage of her niece, Man Bai, the daughter of Raja Bhagwant Das, to her son, Prince Salim, which took place on 13 February 1585. Man Bai, became Salim's first wife. To mark the occasion, Akbar personally visited Amer and, as a gesture of respect towards Mariam-uz-Zamani's family, carried the bride's palanquin on his shoulders for some distance. The gifts presented by Mariam-uz-Zamani to the bride and groom were valued at twelve lakh rupees. Man Bai later became the mother of Khusrau Mirza, Akbar's favourite grandson, and received the title of Shah Begum.

== Religion and cultural influence ==
Following their marriage, Akbar allowed Mariam-uz-Zamani to continue practising her Hindu faith and perform Hindu rituals within the imperial palace. Although their marriage was concluded as part of a political alliance, later accounts describe the relationship as one that developed into mutual affection. Akbar is also recorded as participating in the pooja performed by the empress. She is described as a devotee of Shiva and Krishna. The palace built for her within the imperial harem was decorated with paintings of Krishna as well as gems and frescoes. Akbar also commissioned the Nilkanth Temple at Mandu, dedicated to Shiva and constructed in an Indo-Islamic architectural style. The adjoining palace later became one of Jahangir's preferred places of retreat.

Mariam-uz-Zamani is also associated with the introduction of Rajput cultural traditions at the Mughal court. Harka Bai is described as arriving at Akbar's court in the dress of the Rajput nobility, and within a few years elements of Rajput clothing and courtly etiquette had become incorporated into Mughal fashion. Sylvia Houghteling suggests that the inclusion of textiles such as bandhani in royal paintings produced near Mariam-uz-Zamani's birthplace may have reflected imperial acknowledgement of her cultural influence.

== As Empress of Hindustan ==
She was referred to as the Queen of the Country during Akbar's reignand as the Queen Mother during the reign of her son, Jahangir. As empress consort, she exercised considerable influence at Akbar's chief court, while her high rank within the imperial harem afforded her extensive authority and privileges.

Historian Ira Mukhoty argues that Mariam-uz-Zamani influenced Akbar and the Mughal court in complex and nuanced ways and had a significant cultural, culinary, artistic, and religious impact. She further describes her as one of the most influential, powerful, and wealthiest women of the Mughal Empire.

Historian Findly describes Mariam-uz-Zamani as a charismatic and adventurous woman, having a high-spirited disposition and a taste for the unusual. Muni Lal writes that she was widely respected across different communities for her tolerance, generosity, and concern for the poor.

In the Akbarnama, Abu'l-Fazl describes her as Raja Bharmal's eldest daughter "in whose forehead shone the lights of chastity and intellect", and refers to her as "the choicest apple from the garden of paradise". In the Muntakhab-ut-Tawarikh, Badayuni describes her as a woman with a gentle disposition. In the Tabaqat-i-Akbari, Nizamuddin Ahmad records that the daughter of Raja Bharmal "was ennobled by a marriage with His Majesty and was enlisted in the rank of honoured consorts".

Akbar had commissioned several palaces for her in Fatehpur Sikri, Mandu, Lahore, and Agra. In Agra, her palace of residence is believed to be Jahangiri Mahal, constructed by Akbar for his Hindu wives. When Akbar moved his court to Fatehpur Sikri in 1571, she resided in one of the most magnificent and beautiful palaces of Fatehpur Sikri which was built in the Zenana complex. This palace was built as per Rajasthani architecture. This palace commonly known as Jodha Bai Mahal was also internally connected to the Khawabgah of Akbar. Her palace was decorated with paintings of Lord Krishna and in its time is reported to be studded with gems and frescoes. This palace also includes a temple used by the empress for her prayers and a Tulsi math. Jodha Bai's Mahal was a masterpiece with its commotion of Indian and Persian architecture. This was the biggest residential palace in the city, and to this day it stands, though in ruins, as a monument of Akbar's love for the Amber princess.

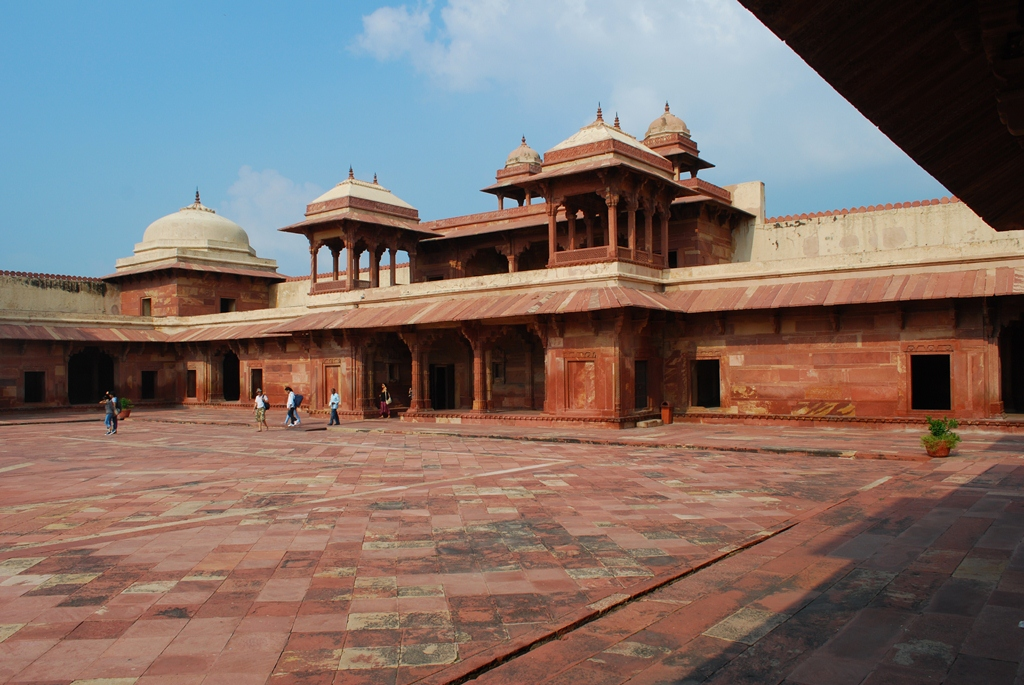
Khawabgah of Mariam-uz-Zamani within her palace in Fatehpur Sikri, commonly known as Jodha bai Palace.

Her palace in Mandu called Nilkanth temple (Mandu) or as recorded by Jahangir in his biography, Imarat-i-Dilkhusha (the heart-pleasing abode), was the favourite retreat place of Jahangir where he would celebrate his birthdays with his mother as recorded by Thomas Roe, a Christian missionary in Jahangir's court. This palace was commissioned by Akbar for her in the year 1574 and has a Lord Shiva temple inside with a Shiv Ling and is built as per Mughal architecture on a hilltop. She was also the patron of several towns during her reign and held many jagirs.

She would often travel to her hometown, Amber, which was just 200 km away from her home. During the Gujarat campaign when her brother Bhupat died during the battle of Sarnal, Akbar sent Mariam-uz-Zamani, who was travelling with him, to her native town Amer, to pay condolences and to partake in the mourning ceremony of her brother.

== Powers and influence ==
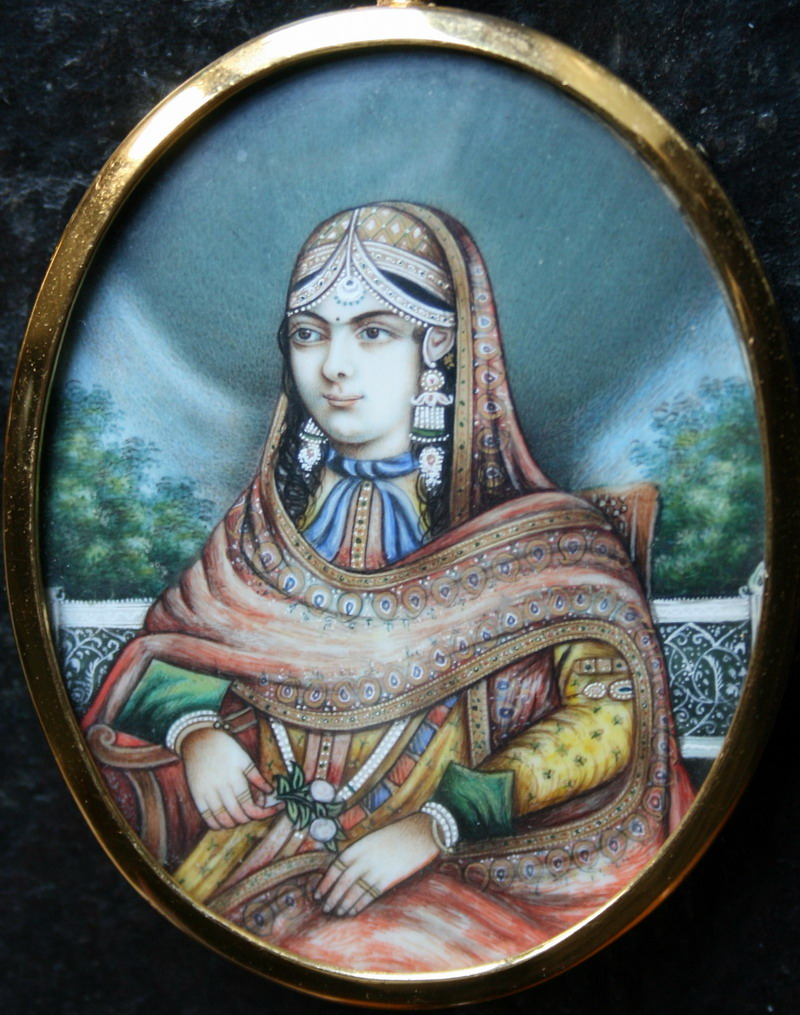
A 19th-century sketch of Mariam-uz-Zamani

Mariam-uz-Zamani was one of the four senior-most figures at the Mughal court and the only woman to hold the rank of 12,000 cavalry units, the highest military rank. As the senior-most woman in the imperial harem, she held a high rank throughout her husband's reign. Muni Lal refers to her as the "First Lady of the Empire". Historian Abu'l-Fazl likewise recorded that she held a high rank in the imperial harem.

She had the authority to issue farmans (royal decrees) in her own name. This privilege was reserved only for the highest-ranking women of the imperial harem. One of the surviving pieces of farman issued in her name during the reign of her son, Jahangir. It explicitly identifies her as Wali Nimat Begam the mother of Nuruddin Jahangir, the King. The original document is preserved in the Red Fort Museum and is catalogued as Archaeological Survey of India No. G. 51; IHRC VIII, pp. 167–169.

Invocation: In the name of Allah the Great.

Seal: From Wali Nimat Begam, mother of Nuruddin Jahangir, the King.

Unwan: hukm Mariam Zamani

... It is therefore hereby ordered that you summon all parties involved, investigate the matter, and ensure that all revenue is delivered to Mudabbir Beg. This order must be executed without delay.

Based on the document, historian Ruby Lal identifies Wali Nimat Begam and Mariam-uz-Zamani as the same person. This identification is consistent with the account of Sujan Rai Bhandari, who states in the Khulasatut Tawarikh that Jahangir was born to the daughter of Raja Bharmal, and with Abu'l-Fazl's account in the Ain-i-Akbari, which records that Akbar married the daughter of Raja Bharmal and sister of Bhagwan Das at Sambhar.

The Empress was one of the wealthiest women of the Mughal Empire and possessed substantial personal wealth. She used her riches to build gardens, wells, and mosques the empire. She had an extensive administrative network that included agents, middlemen, financial advisers, and vakils to oversee her estates and manage her affairs. According to Ira Mukhoty, her organization "mirrored in miniature the Emperor's finance ministry". She also supported the spread of education among the common people.

During the reigns of Akbar and Jahangir, Mariam-uz-Zamani was frequently honoured by members of the imperial court and prominent citizens, who presented her with gifts and jewels according to their rank. This was particularly evident during the annual New Year's festival, when she received jewels from every nobleman according to his rank, an honour not bestowed upon any other Mughal empress. Jahangir, accompanied by his courtiers, also visited her palace on the eve of the festival to present her with jewels and other gifts.

According to Rukhsana Iftikhar, Mariam-uz-Zamani enjoyed considerable freedom to express her views in matters of the imperial court. Badayuni records that after a conservative Muslim courtier ordered the execution of a Brahmin despite Akbar's instruction to continue the investigation, the emperor's Hindu wives publicly reproached him for allowing his order to be disregarded.Badayuni 1590b

Badayuni wrote that the orthodox ulema at Akbar's court resented the influence of Mariam-uz-Zamani and Akbar's other Hindu wives on the emperor's religious practices. He claimed that Akbar accommodated the religious customs of his Hindu wives by ordering the continuous burning of the hom and, on one occasion, required members of the court to stand during the evening prayers held in their temples. Badayuni associated these practices with the later development of the Tawhid-i-Ilahi.Badayuni 1590a, p. 269Badayuni 1590b

Badayuni further wrote that, in deference to the sentiments of his Hindu wives, Akbar gave up eating beef because the cow is a sacred animal in Hinduism. He also wrote that they persuaded the emperor to abstain from eating onions and garlic, refrain from keeping a beard, and avoid the company of bearded men. According to Badayuni, Akbar adopted these practices to gain the affection and goodwill of his Hindu wives, and shaving the beard gradually became common practice at court.Badayuni 1590a, p. 312–313

One of her intercessions in the inclination of his son included in May 1603, when Akbar suggested that Salim should undertake a military expedition for chastizement of Rana Amar Singh who was making encroachments on Mughal territories in Rajasthan. Salim suspicious of his father's motives expressed his reluctance to accept the assignment however this provoked Akbar to issue a formal firman appointing Shahzada Salim to the command of the proposed expedition. The ladies of the harem, Mariam-uz-Zamani and Salima Sultan Begum requested the Emperor not to press the matter, and let Salim continue to live under his eye at the court. Akbar succumbed to their pleas and withdrew the firman. Muni Lal says that at the time when Akbar marched towards Salim to wage a war, Mariam-uz-Zamani was torn by conflicting loyalties between father and son.

Muni Lal notes another intervention of her alongside Salima Sultan Begum to revoke the orders of house arrest for Salim by Akbar. After the death of Hamida Bano Begum, to cease his rebellions and put an end to his alcoholism and debauchery, Akbar ordered he should be kept in solitary confinement in ghusalkhana and ordered no serving of alcohol and opium. Salim begging for wine the entire time behaved like a madman. Akbar appointed his physician to recommend the minimum necessary alcohol for his health. Muni Lal claims, 'the taming of the temperamental Salim bristled with complications, especially when Mariam Zamani and Salima Begum took into their scheming heads to leave no design unused to win freedom for their Baba. The pressure from the senior queens became too compelling to be resisted for long. Akbar gave in and allowed Salim to shift to his palace.

=== Protection of Khusrau ===
Following Akbar's death in 1605, Mariam-uz-Zamani became the principal protector of her grandson, Khusrau Mirza. According to the Jesuit missionary Jerome Xavier, she joined Salima Sultan Begum, Shakr-un-Nissa Begum, and Jahangir's sisters in securing a pardon for Khusrau upon Jahangir's accession.

According to Ellison Banks Findly, Nur Jahan sought custody of Prince Khusrau, a leading claimant to the Mughal throne, and attempted to win Mariam-uz-Zamani's support by feigning grief before the queen mother. The attempt was unsuccessful, and Jahangir, responding to appeals from his mother, sisters, and Khusrau's stepmothers, declined to place the prince under the custody of either Nur Jahan or Prince Khurram.

== As an entrepreneur ==
Mariam-uz-Zamani engaged extensively in trade and commerce, she is the earliest recorded Mughal woman to have consistently participated in both inland and overseas trade. According to Ellison Banks Findly, she helped the role of Mughal women in the sphere of overseas commerce and was the most prominent female merchant of the Mughal Empire.

During the reigns of Akbar and Jahangir, she commissioned ships that carried Hajj pilgrims to Mecca, conducted an extensive trade in silk and spices, and oversaw commercial exchanges with ports in the Persian Gulf. Collier writes that Akbar took a personal interest in her commercial ventures, investing both time and resources in her enterprises and frequently discussing trade with her.

According to Aiysha Safdar, Mariam-uz-Zamani recognised the strategic importance of maritime trade and supported the development of a naval presence for commerce and the transport of Hajj pilgrims. Safdar writes that Akbar subsequently permitted her to build ships for trade and pilgrimage at the Khizri Darwaza on the Ravi River.

According to Findly, Mariam-uz-Zamani commissioned the first large ocean-going ships built by the Mughals at Lahore and owned the empire's largest vessels, the Rahīmī and later the Ganj-i-Sawai. Findly further notes that no other Mughal noblewoman is known to have engaged in maritime trade on a comparable scale, and that no merchant vessel attracted as much attention or controversy as the Rahīmī. Nur Jahan and Jahanara Begum later continued this tradition by participating in overseas trade and commerce.

=== East India Company ===
In late 1610 or early 1611, while one of Mariam-uz-Zamani's ships was being loaded for Mocha, she dispatched one of her agents to purchase indigo at Bayana, an important centre of indigo production about 50 miles (80 km) southwest of Agra, for shipment to the Red Sea port. According to Findly, just as the transaction was about to be completed, the English merchant William Finch intervened by offering a higher price for the indigo and secured the purchase instead. Finch was acting on behalf of William Hawkins, the ambassador of the East India Company, who had been received at Jahangir's court.

According to Findly, Mariam-uz-Zamani protested to Jahangir after learning that her agent had been outbid by an English merchant, resulting in the loss of the indigo shipment intended for Mocha. Hawkins subsequently encountered prolonged difficulties at court and later wrote that he had to seek the assistance of the Jesuits in order to obtain safe conduct for himself and his wife to travel to Goa, where they intended to embark for Europe. Finch, meanwhile, struggled to dispose of the indigo in Lahore and eventually concluded that the prospects for English trade in India were poor. He informed Hawkins of his intention to sell the cargo at Aleppo before returning to England.

According to Findly, Finch's decision to outbid Mariam-uz-Zamani's agent had serious consequences for the East India Company's relations with Jahangir's court. The effects of the dispute continued into the following year. In 1612, the English captain John Jourdain recorded that local merchants refused to load their goods aboard the Rahīmī until the Europeans had left the country, writing:

"the Queen's ship, the Rahimi, was bound for Mocha, & the [local] merchants would not lade their goods aboard until wee [Europeans] were gone from the country."

=== Conflict with the Portuguese ===
Relations between the Mughal Empire and the Portuguese remained generally cordial during Akbar's reign and continued into the early years of Jahangir's rule. The arrival of the English East India Company at the Mughal court, however, challenged Portugal's commercial position in the region. According to Findly, the Portuguese sought to pressure Jahangir into excluding their European rivals by seizing a ship belonging to his mother, the Queen Mother Mariam-uz-Zamani.

William Hawkins recorded that on 1 February 1609, one of Mariam-uz-Zamani's ships was the subject of a dispute while being prepared for its voyage to Mocha, a major Red Sea port. According to Hawkins, the Portuguese threatened to seize the vessel and take it to Diu unless Mariam-uz-Zamani paid an exorbitant fee for a cartaz, a Portuguese naval pass required for merchant shipping. Hawkins further recorded that the Portuguese initially demanded 100,000 mamudies for the cartaz, later reduced the amount to 20,000, before both sides ultimately agreed on a payment of 1,000 rialls and a small additional sum in order to avert violence.

A major incident that further strained relations between the Mughals and the Portuguese was the seizure and burning of Mariam-uz-Zamani's pilgrimage ship, the Rahīmī, in September 1613. According to Findly, the Rahimi was carrying a valid Portuguese cartaz and had not violated its conditions when it was seized by the Portuguese. The vessel, together with its cargo valued at approximately £100,000 and around 700 passengers, was taken to Goa. The Portuguese viceroy Jeronimo de Azevedo reportedly described the capture of the Rahimi as "worthy prey that was brought and for giving the Mughals a cause of sorrow".

After it became clear that the Portuguese would not return Mariam-uz-Zamani's ship, Jahangir ordered Muqarrab Khan, the governor of Surat, to halt maritime trade at the empire's principal port and lay siege to the Portuguese settlement of Daman. He also ordered the closure of the Jesuit church at Agra, which had been established during Akbar's reign, and suspended the allowances granted to Portuguese priests in the Mughal Empire.

The seizure of the Rahimi provoked an unusually strong reaction within the Mughal Empire. According to Findly, the incident generated widespread unrest at court and in Surat, and was "the only act of piracy against India" on record to elicit such a severe response from the Mughal government. Findly further argues that Jahangir's response marked a departure from the Mughal court's earlier accommodation of Portuguese aggression, as Mariam-uz-Zamani insisted on redress for the seizure of her flagship pilgrimage vessel. Historian Ira Mukhoty describes the incident as reflecting broader political and cultural changes within the Mughal Empire, noting that it involved a Hindu queen's Muslim pilgrimage ship carrying Hajj pilgrims through waters patrolled by the Portuguese, a Christian maritime power.

Following the incident, the Portuguese sought to negotiate a settlement with the Mughal court. They agreed to compensate the Mughal government for the loss of Mariam-uz-Zamani's ship and to issue additional cartazes to Indian vessels sailing to the Red Sea. However, the proposal remained conditional on Jahangir expelling the English from his court, a demand he refused to accept.

A subsequent agreement required the Portuguese to pay three lakh rupees in compensation for the seized vessel, while the question of expelling the English remained unresolved as Jahangir increasingly recognized the value of English naval power. The capture of the Rahimi marked a turning point in Mughal–Portuguese relations and contributed to the growing influence of the English in the Mughal Empire.

=== Post Rahimi Business Activities ===
Mariam-uz-Zamani carried on with her commercial and pilgrimage ships despite losing her 'greatest pilgrimage ship', the Rahimi. She was in command of a fleet of ships. In 1617, two English pirates tried to seize Mariam-uz-Zamani's ship, which was returning from the Red Sea with numerous hajjis and valuable cargo, but in the nick of time, the ship was rescued. If it had not been for the fortunate interposition of the fleet of the East India Company, which came up before the contest was decided, the result of Englishmen's selfish enterprise would have been the closing of the busiest markets in India to English commerce.

After the loss of her ship Rahimi, the Dowager Empress then ordered the build of an even larger ship with 62 guns and the placement of over 400 musket men. It was named 'Ganj-I-Sawai' and in its day was the most fearsome ship in the sea with the objective of trade and taking pilgrims to Mecca and on the way back converting all the goods into gold, and silver, and bringing back the pilgrims.

== Relationship with her son ==
In his memoirs, Jahangir recorded several instances that reflect the respect he showed toward his mother. He noted that he paid obeisance to her by touching her feet and consistently referred to her with the honorific Hazrat, using forms such as "Hazrat Mariam-uz-Zamani", "Her Majesty", and "my exalted mother". Contemporary accounts also record that Jahangir personally carried his mother's palanquin on his shoulders as a mark of respect.

Around 1595, the Portuguese Jesuit Benedict Goes recorded an incident in which Mariam-uz-Zamani was robbed while travelling and was left without her possessions and basic necessities. Goes provided her with whatever assistance he could afford, and news of his actions later reached Akbar's court. According to Goes, his assistance was acknowledged at court, and when Mariam-uz-Zamani returned safely to Agra, she was welcomed by a large reception bearing gifts.

Goes further recorded that Prince Salim, who was then about eight days' journey from Agra, hurried back to see his mother upon hearing of her return. When he later met Goes, Salim did not allow him to perform the customary gesture of obeisance by embracing his feet, instead raising him up and inquiring after his health before ordering that the money Goes had advanced to his mother be repaid in full.

Jahangir's memoirs record that he greeted his mother by performing the customary acts of Korunish, Sajda, and Taslim before her. During his journey to Kabul in 1607, he instructed Prince Khurram to escort Mariam-uz-Zamani and the other women of the imperial household to Lahore, where he travelled to meet her and recorded performing these ceremonies of obeisance before his mother.

During the plague at Agra in 1619, when Jahangir was staying at Fatehpur Sikri, he recorded that Mariam-uz-Zamani travelled from Agra to visit him and expressed gratitude for the opportunity to wait upon her, adding that he hoped "the shadow of her protection and affection" would always remain over him.

Jahangir continued to show public respect toward his mother throughout his reign. According to Findly, on the occasion of the Persian New Year, he personally visited Mariam-uz-Zamani's residence accompanied by his nobles, each of whom presented her with jewels according to his rank. The English traveller Edward Terry likewise remarked that Jahangir frequently demonstrated filial devotion and affection toward his mother.

Mariam-uz-Zamani also hosted several imperial ceremonies and celebrations at her palace, including Jahangir's solar and lunar weighings, his birthday celebrations, his marriage to the Amer princess, daughter of Kunwar Jagat Singh, the wedding of Prince Parviz to the daughter of Sultan Murad Mirza, and the henna ceremony of Ladli Begum, daughter of Nur Jahan and Shahryar Mirza.

== Architectural patronage and legacy ==
Mariam-uz-Zamani was one of the leading female patrons of art and architecture of her time. Her architectural patronage included the Begum Shahi Mosque in Lahore, Pakistan, and a baoli (stepwell) together with a garden at Brahmabad, near Bayana, both commissioned during the reign of her son Jahangir. She also laid out a large garden around the tomb of her husband, Emperor Akbar, where she was later buried. In addition, she commissioned the entrance to the Lahore Fort, known as Masjidi Darwaza, now corrupted into Masti Darwaja (Masti Gate).

Both the Begum Shahi Mosque and Mariam-uz-Zamani's baoli bear inscriptions attesting to her patronage. A Persian inscription on the northern gateway records that the mosque was constructed during the early years of Jahangir's reign, in 1023 A.H./1614 A.D. A marble inscription on the gateway of the baoli dates its construction to the seventh regnal year of Jahangir (1612), indicating that it was commissioned around the same time as the Begum Shahi Mosque. Together, these monuments reflect the important role of female patronage in Mughal architecture during Jahangir's reign.

=== Begum Shahi Mosque ===
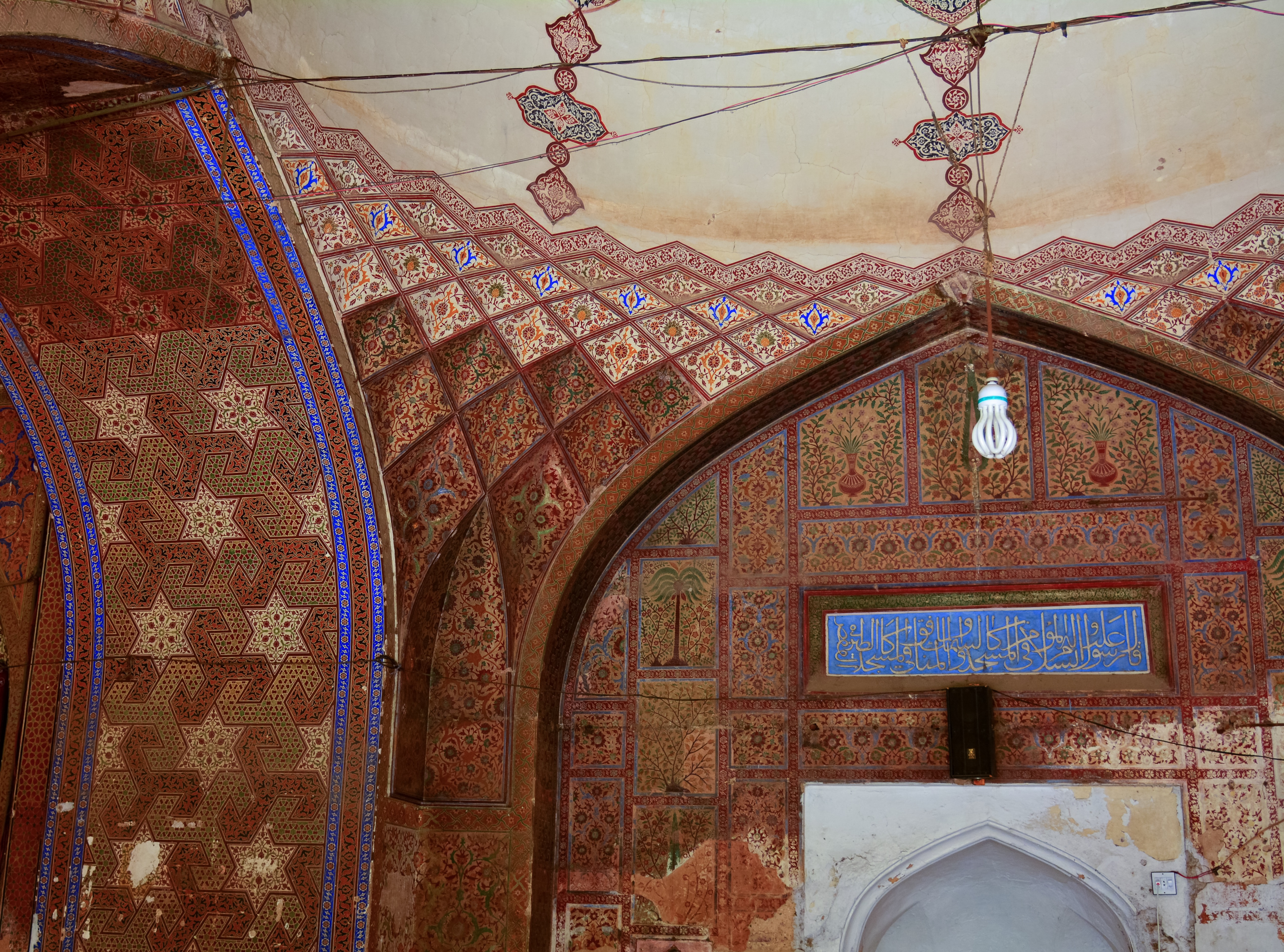
Begum Shahi Mosque, one of the earliest and most exquisite mosques of Mughal Empire in Lahore.

Begum Shahi Mosque is the earliest dated mosque of the Mughal Empire built during the reign of Jahangir. Named in her honour, it is located near the old Masti Gate of the Walled City of Lahore, opposite the eastern walls of the Lahore Fort. The mosque is noted for its frescoes, which are distinguished by their technique and variety of subjects. It also contains the earliest dated Iranian motif in Mughal architecture.

Architectural historian Mortimer Wheeler described the mosque's frescoes as unrivalled in Pakistan, and perhaps in India, for their delicacy, variety, and harmonious golden tone.

Ahmad Nabi Khan regarded the mosque's interior decoration as unparalleled in early Mughal architecture, citing its extensive use of geometric, floral, and inscriptional designs arranged in a subtle colour scheme.

According to Ebba Koch, the mosque is among the finest examples of the fusion of Timurid and Safavid architectural elements. The prayer hall is a single-aisle, five-bay structure with elaborate painted decoration, while its central dome contains one of the earliest dated examples of a geometric network developed from points arranged in concentric circles.

The mosque features Lahore's first five-bay prayer chamber, which later became characteristic of Mughal mosques such as the Wazir Khan Mosque and the Badshahi Mosque. The ceilings of the Tomb of I'timād-ud-Daulah, with their richly polychromed net vaulting and stellate forms, represent a more refined development of those at the Begum Shahi Mosque. Similar polychrome decorative techniques were later employed in the prayer chamber of the Wazir Khan Mosque, particularly in its central pishtaq, recessed arch, and stellate vaulting.

At the time of its construction, it was the principal mosque in the vicinity of the Lahore Fort, and was therefore regularly attended by members of the Mughal court. It continued to serve both the Mughal nobility and the general public as a place of worship for more than two centuries, until it was converted into a gunpowder factory under Ranjit Singh.

=== Mariam-uz-Zamani's Baoli ===
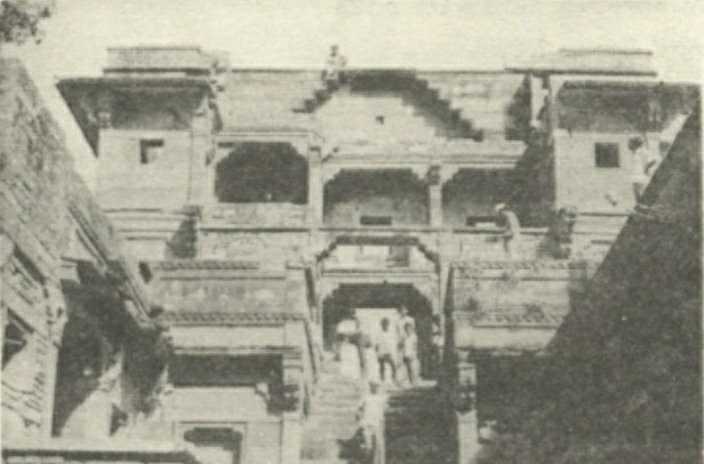
Maryam Zamani's Baoli at Bayana

Around 1612, Mariam-uz-Zamani commissioned a baoli (stepwell) together with a large garden at Bayana, near the old district of Brahmabad. A few years after its construction, her son Jahangir inspected the complex and praised the quality of its construction, recording that the baoli had cost 20,000 rupees to build.

The baoli was later described by the English traveller Peter Mundy as "the best of this Kinde that I have yet seene,... a very costly and curious piece of worke". He further noted its beautiful gateways, cupolas, arches, chhatris, galleries, pillars, and chambers above and below. The baoli consists of a gateway, four flights of steps descending to the water level, and a well-shaft at the far end of the main axis, all constructed in red sandstone. Another European traveller, Thevenot, described the garden and baoli complex as a royal residence, suggesting that it also served as accommodation for its royal patron during her occasional visits to the area.

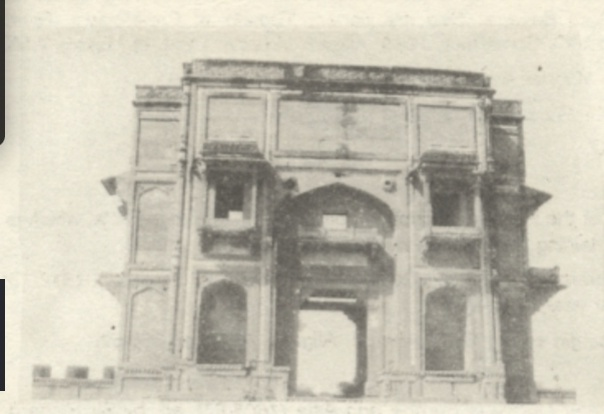
Majestic gateway of Maryam Zamani's baoli

The main gateway of the baoli is a double-storeyed structure facing east, with a smaller rectangular entrance set within a high arch. It is characteristic of early 17th-century Mughal architecture following the Fatehpur Sikri period, while also incorporating Rajput architectural influences. Although it consists of only two storeys, it was designed to create the appearance of a three-storeyed structure when viewed from the front. The baoli formed part of the garden complex commissioned by the empress.

Rajeev Bargoti suggests that Mariam-uz-Zamani's interest in the indigo trade may have been linked to her revenue-free land grants in the indigo-producing region around Bayana, including the pargana of Jansath.

The Persian inscription on Mariam-uz-Zamani's baoli reads:

"1. During the reign of Shah Nuruddin Jahangir, the world became a garden because of his benevolence.

2. By the order of his mother, Maryam Zamani, the divine light became bright.

3. There was built a bagh (garden) and a beautiful baoli (step-well), which made paradise blush with shame.

4. The intelligence said for the hijra date: San I haft julus padshahi (the seventh regnal year of the king)."

== Death ==
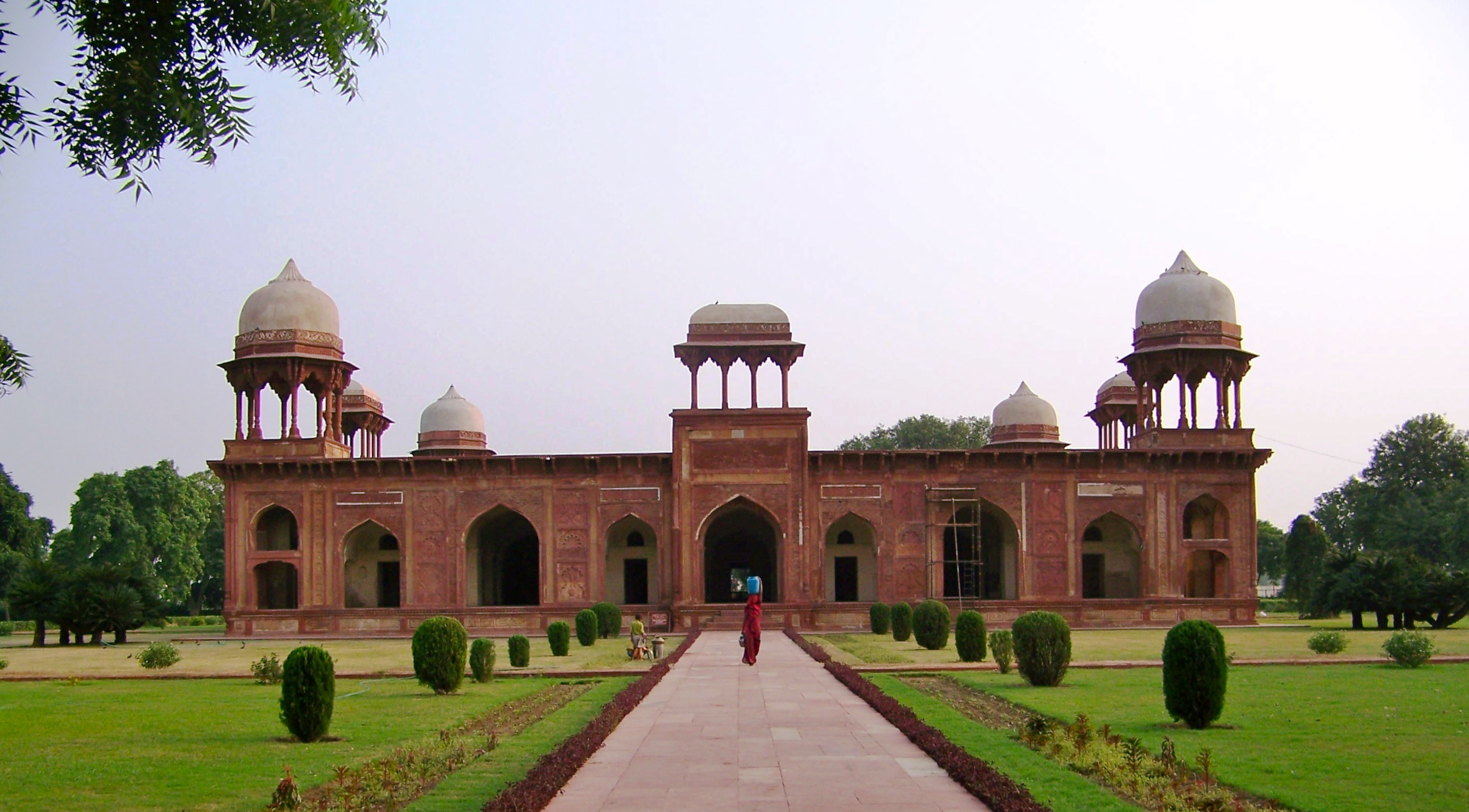
Tomb of Mariam-uz-Zamani, Sikandra, Agra

Mariam-uz-Zamani died in May 1623, immensely rich and powerful. She was buried with due honour in a mausoleum at Sikandra, near the tomb of her husband, Akbar.

The cause of her death is not recorded in contemporary sources. However, Jahangir's memoirs contain several references to her declining health from 1616 onwards, describing her as physically frail in her later years.

Her tomb, built between 1623 and 1627, is situated on Tantpur Road in Jyoti Nagar, adjacent to the Tomb of Akbar the Great. Tomb of Mariam-uz-Zamani, commissioned by her son Jahangir, is located about one kilometre from Akbar's mausoleum in the direction of Mathura. She is the only one of Akbar's wives buried in close proximity to his tomb.

The mausoleum shares one of the principal features of Akbar's tomb the upper storey is open to the sky, while its corners are crowned with domed pavilions. The burial chamber itself is located underground and is reached by a flight of steps.

== Erroneous identification ==
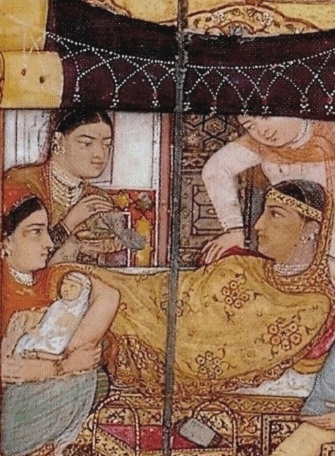
Mariam-uz-Zamani rests on bed after giving birth to prince Salim, painting from Jahangirnama, c. 1610-15

=== Misnomer of "Jodha Bai" ===
During Akbar's reign, a decree prohibited the public mention of the names of women in the imperial seraglio. To preserve their privacy and honour, women of the harem were instead referred to by honorific titles or epithets associated with their place of origin or the place where they entered the imperial household. Consistent with this court etiquette, Mariam-uz-Zamani's personal name does not appear in contemporary Mughal chronicles. In the Akbarnama, Abu'l-Fazl ibn Mubarak identifies her as the daughter of Raja Bharmal and elsewhere refers to her as the sister of Raja Bhagwant Das. Her son Jahangir, meanwhile, consistently refers to her by her imperial title, Hazrat Mariam-uz-Zamani, in the Tuzk-e-Jahangiri.

The absence of her personal name in contemporary Mughal sources gave rise to later speculation regarding her historical identity. Modern historians attribute this omission to Mughal court conventions concerning the privacy of imperial women. Ira Mukhoty notes that the identities of royal women were protected under zenana customs, with honorific titles taking precedence over personal names, while Ruby Lal observes that titles such as Mariam-uz-Zamani functioned as the principal markers of identity and authority within the Mughal court.

In popular culture today, she is widely remembered by the misnomer "Jodha Bai". However, this specific name is completely absent from any Mughal-era historical records. Its earliest known association with Akbar's chief consort is traced to James Tod's nineteenth-century work, Annals and Antiquities of Rajasthan. Modern historians generally regard this identification as erroneous, noting that the name suggests a princess from Jodhpur, whereas Mariam-uz-Zamani was a Kachhwaha princess of Amber. Historian Satish Chandra has pointed out that "Jodh Bai" properly referred to Jagat Gosain, the Rajput wife of Jahangir and daughter of Raja Udai Singh of Jodhpur.

=== Misidentification as Christian ===
Beginning in the nineteenth century, some writers mistakenly assumed that Mariam-uz-Zamani was a Christian woman. This misconception largely stemmed from her title, Mariam, combined with the absence of her personal name from contemporary Mughal records. The name Mariam was associated by writers with Mary, the mother of Jesus. In Islamic tradition, however, Maryam is also the name of the mother of Isa and occupies a revered position in the Al-Qur'an. The title Mariam-uz-Zamani was bestowed upon her by Akbar following the birth of Prince Salim, while Akbar's own mother, Hamida Banu Begum bore the honorific Mariam Makani, reflecting the Mughal practice of bestowing such titles on senior women of the imperial household rather than using their personal names.

The Christian identification has also been associated with the title Mariam-uz-Zamani and the paintings in the Sonahra Makan at Fatehpur Sikri. Ashirbadi Lal Srivastava notes that Mariam-uz-Zamani was an honorific title conferred upon her after the birth of Prince Salim rather than a personal name, while Edmund W. Smith attributes the misunderstanding to interpretations made by some early visitors to Fatehpur Sikri, who believed the paintings depicted the Annunciation. Smith further notes that an examination of her tomb found no evidence supporting its identification as that of a Christian woman.

== Issue ==
Mughal Emperor Akbar and Mariam-uz-Zamani Begum are confirmed to have at least four children:

- Fatima Banu Begum (c. 1562 — died in infancy)
- Hassan Mirza (19 October 1564, Agra, Mughal Empire — 5 November 1564, Agra, Mughal Empire) (twin with Hussain)
- Hussain Mirza (19 October 1564, Agra, Mughal Empire — 29 October 1564, Agra, Mughal Empire) (twin with Hassan)
- Jahangir (Salim) (30 August 1569, Fatehpur Sikri, Mughal Empire — 28 October 1627, Rajouri, Mughal Empire)

== In popular culture ==
=== Films and TV serials ===
- Sulochana portrayed Rani Jodha Bai in the 1953 film Anarkali.
- Durga Khote portrayed Jodha Bai in the 1960 Indian epic film Mughal-e-Azam.
- Zohra Mirza played the role of Jodha Bai in 1958 Urdu film Anarkali.
- Jamuna played the role of Jodha bai in the Telugu movie Akbar Salim Anarkali
- Puja Acharya donned the role of Mariam-uz-Zamani as 'Jodha Bai' in the Doordarshan television series Akbar The Great (1988–1989).
- Aishwarya Rai portrayed Jodha Bai in the 2008 film Jodhaa Akbar directed by Ashutosh Gowarikar.
- Paridhi Sharma played the role of Jodha Bai in the historical drama series Jodha Akbar which ran from 2013 to 2015.
- Delnaaz Irani portrayed Jodha Bai in the historical comedy series Har Mushkil Ka Hal Akbar Birbal from 2014 to 2016. She was replaced by Pragati Mehra in 2016 for a few episodes as she was unavailable due to personal issues.
- Tasha Kapoor portrayed the role of Heer Kunwari aka Jodha Bai in Bharat Ka Veer Putra – Maharana Pratap
- Jodha Bai was portrayed by Gurdeep Kohli in the Colors TV series Dastaan-E-Mohabbat Salim Anarkali.
- Aditi Sajwan portrayed the empress in the Star Bharat comedy series Akbar Ka Bal Birbal.
- Anuradha Tarafdar played the role of Jodha Bai in Manohar Arshi's film, Akbar's Bridge.
- Sandhya Mridul portrayed Jodha Bai in Taj: Divided by Blood.

=== Literature ===
- Jodha Bai is also a major character in Salman Rushdie's 2008 novel The Enchantress of Florence.
- She is the pivot character in the book of Subhadra Sen Gupta, The Teenage Diary of Jodh Bai, as the character Jodh bai.

== See also ==
- Begum Shahi Mosque
- Jodha Bai Mahal
- Nilkanth temple (Mandu)
- Rahīmī
- Ganj-I-Sawai

== Bibliography ==
- Ahmad, Nizamuddin (1599). Tabaqat-i-Akbari.
- Ahmad, Nizamuddin (1936). Tabaqat-i-Akbari. Vol. II.
- Asher, Catherine B. (1992). Architecture of Mughal India. Vol. 4. Cambridge; New York: Cambridge University Press. ISBN 978-0-521-26728-1.
- Bargoti, Rajeev (1991). "Maryam Zamani's Baoli at Bayana". Proceedings of the Indian History Congress. 52. Indian History Congress: 464–469. JSTOR 44142642.
- Badayuni, Abdul Qadir (1884). Muntakhab-ut-Tawarikh. Vol. 2.
- Badayuni, Abdul Qadir (1590). Muntakhab-ut-Tawarikh. Vol. 2.
- Badayuni, Abdul Qadir (1590). Muntakhab-ut-Tawarikh. Vol. 3.
- Eraly, Abraham (2000). Emperors of the Peacock Throne: The Saga of the Great Mughals. Penguin Books. ISBN 978-0-14-100143-2.
- Fazl, Abu'l-Fazl (1873). The Ain-i-Akbari. Vol. 1. Translated by Blochmann, H. Calcutta: Asiatic Society of Bengal.
- Fazl, Abu'l-Fazl (1907). The Akbarnama of Abu'l-Fazl. Vol. 2. Translated by Beveridge, Henry. Calcutta: The Asiatic Society.
- Fazl, Abu'l-Fazl (1973). The Akbarnama of Abu'l-Fazl. Vol. 3. Translated by Beveridge, Henry. Delhi: Rare Books.
- Foster, William (1897). Letters Received by the East India Company. Vol. II.
- Foster, William (1921). Early Travels in India, 1583–1619. London: Oxford University Press.
- Findly, Ellison Banks (April–June 1988). "The Capture of Maryam-uz-Zamānī's Ship: Mughal Women and European Traders". Journal of the American Oriental Society. 108 (2). American Oriental Society: 227–238. doi:10.2307/603650. JSTOR 603650.
- Findly, Ellison B. (1993). Nur Jahan: Empress of Mughal India. New York: Oxford University Press. ISBN 978-0-19-536060-8.
- Havell, E. B. (1912). A Handbook to Agra and the Taj, Sikandra, Fatehpur-Sikri and the Neighbourhood. London: Longmans, Green & Co.
- Havell, E. B. (1918). The History of Aryan Rule in India from the Earliest Times to the Death of Akbar. New York: Frederick A. Stokes Company.
- Jahangir, Emperor; Thackston, Wheeler McIntosh (1999). The Jahangirnama: Memoirs of Jahangir, Emperor of India. Washington, D.C.: Freer Gallery of Art, Arthur M. Sackler Gallery, Smithsonian Institution; New York: Oxford University Press. pp. , 316. ISBN 978-0-19-512718-8.
- Lal, Muni (1977). Akbar. Delhi: V.P. House Private Ltd.
- Lal, Muni (1980). Akbar. University of Michigan. ISBN 978-0-7069-1076-6. OCLC 7796032.
- Lal, Muni (1988). Mughal Glory. Delhi: Konark Publishers Pvt Ltd. ISBN 81-220-0076-2.
- Lal, Ruby (2005). Domesticity and Power in the Early Mughal World. Cambridge University Press.
- Misra, Rekha (1967). Women in Mughal India, 1526–1748 A.D. Munshiram Manoharlal.
- Mukherjee, Soma (2001). Royal Mughal Ladies and Their Contributions. Gyan Books. ISBN 978-81-212-0760-7.
- Mukhoty, Ira (2018). Daughters of the Sun: Empresses, Queens and Begums of the Mughal Empire. New Delhi: Aleph Book Company. ISBN 978-93-86021-12-0. OCLC 1040634538.
- Prasad, Beni (1930) [1922]. History of Jahangir (2nd ed.). Allahabad: The Indian Press.
- Rogers, Alexander (1909). Beveridge, Henry (ed.). The Tūzuk-i-Jahāngīrī or Memoirs of Jahāngīr. Vol. 1. London: Royal Asiatic Society.
- Rogers, Alexander (1914). Beveridge, Henry (ed.). The Tūzuk-i-Jahāngīrī or Memoirs of Jahāngīr. Vol. 2. London: Royal Asiatic Society.
- Smith, Vincent Arthur (1917). Akbar the Great Mogul, 1542–1605. Oxford at The Clarendon Press.
