= Mukhoty =

Mukhoty is a surname. Notable people with the surname include:

- Ira Mukhoty, Indian author
- Gobinda Mukhoty, co-author of Who Are The Guilty
