= Begum Shahi Mosque =

Mosque in Punjab, Lahore, Pakistan

Mosque of Mariam-uz-Zamani Begum
- بیگم شاہی مسیت (Punjabi) بیگم شاہی مسجد (Urdu)
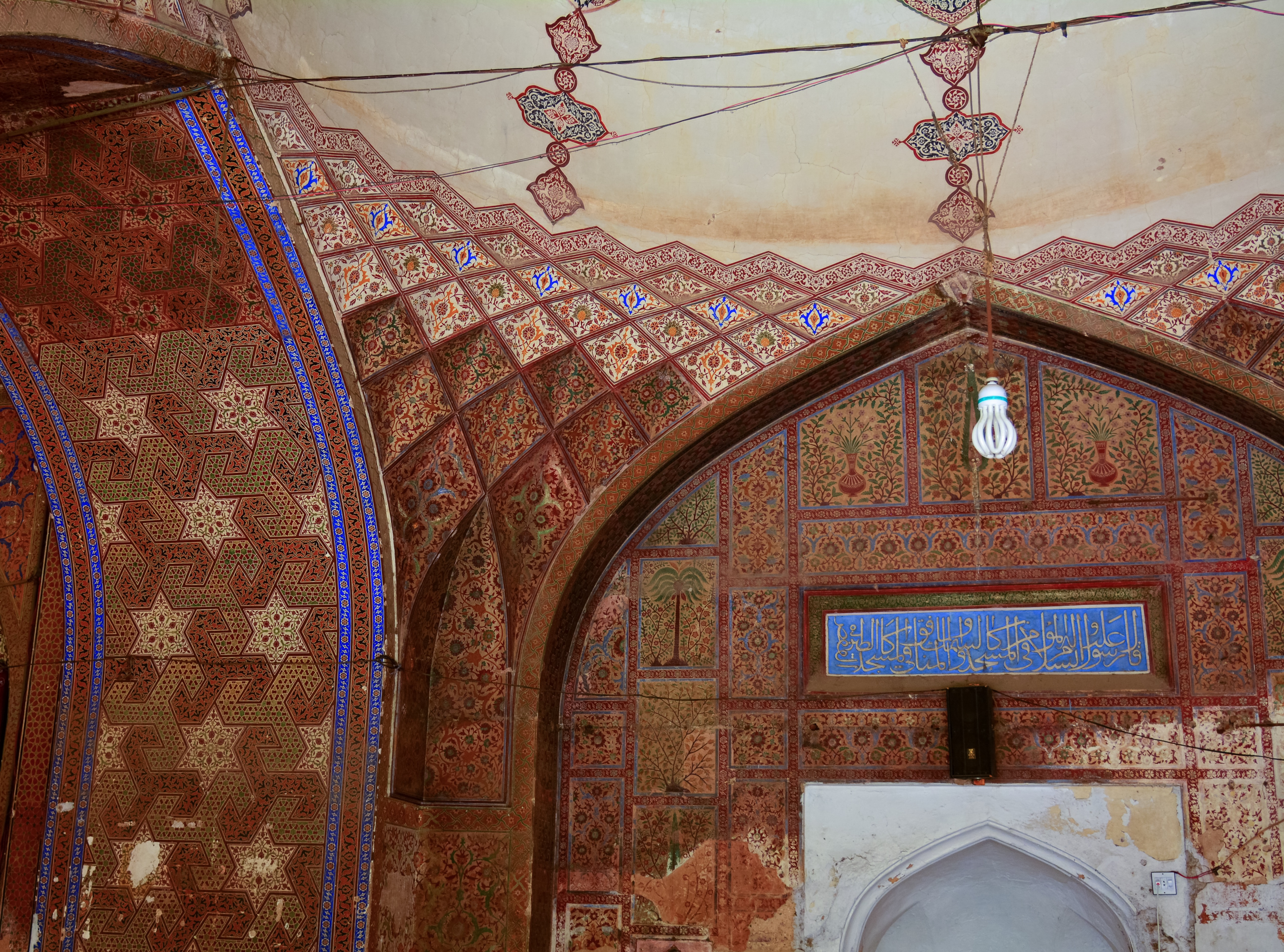
- Mosque of Mariam-uz-Zamani, commonly known as Begum Shahi Mosque

Religion
- Affiliation: Islam

Location
- Location: Lahore, Punjab, Pakistan
- Interactive map of Mosque of Mariam-uz-Zamani Begum
- Coordinates: 31.587095°N 74.317802°E

Architecture
- Type: Mosque
- Style: Indo-Islamic, Mughal
- Founder: Mariam-uz-Zamani
- Funded by: Mariam-uz-Zamani
- Groundbreaking: 1611
- Completed: 1614; 412 years ago

Specifications
- Dome: 3
- Materials: brick

Begum Shahi Mosque, (Note: Punjabi: بیگم شاہی مسیت, romanized: Bègam Shā(h)ī Ma'sīt Urdu: بیگم شاہی مسجد, romanized: Bèghum Shāhī Masjid)) officially the Mosque of Mariyam Zamani Begum, (Note: Punjabi: مریم زمانی بیگم دی مسیت, romanized: Marīam Za'māni Bègam dī Ma'sīt Urdu: مریم زمانی بیگم کی مسجد, romanized: Maryam Zamāni Bèghum kī Masjid) is a 17th-century mosque situated in the interior walled city of Lahore in Punjab, Pakistan. It was commissioned by Mughal empress Mariam-uz-Zamani, the chief consort of Akbar. The mosque was built between 1611 and 1614 during the reign of Jahangir.

It is Lahore's earliest dated Mughal-era mosque. It is known for its exquisite fresco decoration of geometric and floral motifs painted on stucco, along with inscriptions of the names of God.

== Background ==
The mosque was commissioned by Empress Maryam Zamani, chief consort of the Mughal Emperor Akbar and the mother of Emperor Jahangir. It was constructed during the early reign of Jahangir, in 1023 A.H./1614 A.D., as recorded in a Persian inscription fixed on the facade of the northern gate.

Maryam Zamani, a Hindu princess by birth, married into a Muslim community and traded on Christian dominated waterways without being constrained by religious impediments. Her status as a sequestered financier provided her with both the adventure of overseas trade and protection from religious restriction.

This mosque is commonly known as 'Begum Shahi Mosque' after one of the queen's titles, 'Shahi Begum' (lit. Empress Consort).

== Location ==
The mosque is located close to the old Masti Gate of the Walled City of Lahore, opposite the eastern walls of the Lahore Fort.

== History ==
This mosque was built as a Jami mosque for those attending the Mughal court. Construction began in 1611 and lasted until 1614. The mosque remained frequented for prayer by the Mughal nobility and the common man alike for more than two hundred years until it turned into a gunpowder factory during Sikh rule.

== Sikh royal site of worship ==
As per Umdat-Ut-Twarikh, Lahore court account of Ranjit Singh, this mosque was called Shahid Ganj Bhai Mani Singh and was the only major structure in front of Lahore Fort gate, during Sikh rule. It was named after Sikh scholar and martyr Bhai Mani Singh. The Lahore court account tells it was a routine for Sikh royal family of Lahore, especially Ranjit Singh to always do a Sikh prayer Ardās at this place and then leave. Similarly while entering the Lahore Fort Ranjit Singh is written to do Ardās at Shahid Ganj Bhai Mani Singh. Lahore court account mentions that when Ranjit Singh's ashes left the Lahore Fort after his death, a routine Ardās was done in Shahid Ganj of Rs 101. This place was a large structure and is frequently mentioned as a meeting or waiting place for important delegations before entering the Lahore Fort. In 1850, at the request of Muslim population of Lahore such structures of Lahore were given back to Muslims. Similarly Shahid Ganj Bhai Mani Singh was confined to small rear parts of this structure and larger part was named as Begum Shahi Mosque.

During the Sikh rule in Lahore, this mosque was turned into a gunpowder factory by Ranjit Singh, for which it was then known as Barudkhana Wali Masjid ("Gunpowder Mosque"). The gunpowder factory established in the mosque had a full-fledged staff working under the supervision of Jawahar Mal Mistri.

In 1850 A.D., Major McGregor, then Deputy Commissioner of Lahore, restored the mosque to the Muslims, along with shops and houses attached to it, and it acquired its now official name, "Masjid Mariyam Zamani."

== Architecture ==
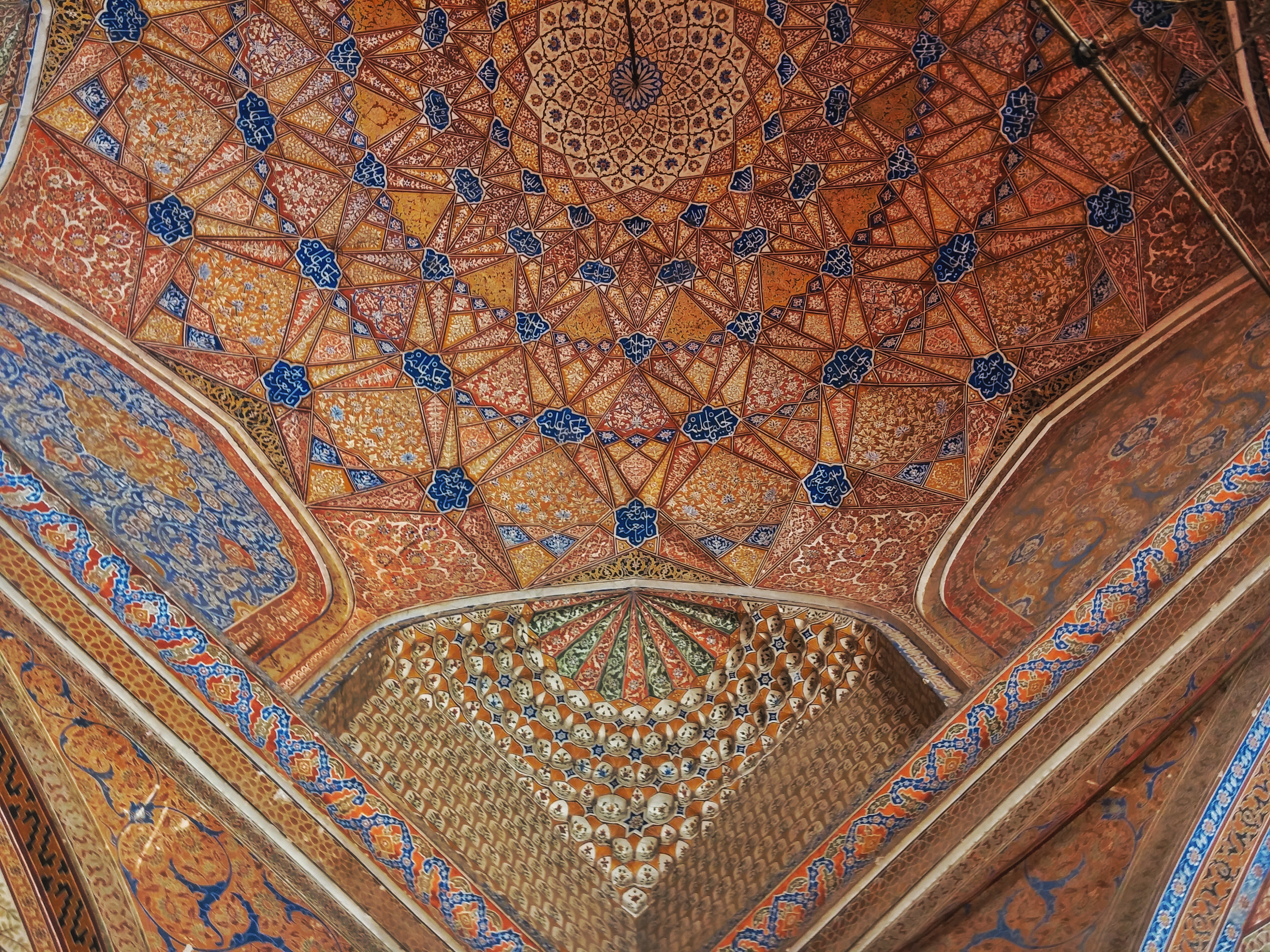
The dome of the mosque is ornately embellished with Mughal era frescoes.

The Mosque of Wali Nimat Mariam-uz-Zamani Begum represents a transitional phase of architecture and features both Mughal influences and influences from the earlier Pashtun Lodi Dynasty which had previously ruled the region. Short domes and wide arches represent the earlier Lodi style, while the mosque's balconies, side rooms, and embellishments are in the Mughal style.

The mosque establishes a style that has been seen in subsequent Mughal mosques and buildings: a single-aisled, rectangular space divided into five bays. The mosque's exterior form belongs to a type long popular in Indo-Islamic architecture.

The mosque features Lahore's first five-bay prayer chamber that would later be typical of all later Mughal mosques such as the Wazir Khan Mosque and Badshahi Mosque. The mosque's central bay is in the style of the Persian Char Taq, and is flanked by one smaller dome on either side. The mosque originally had 3 gateways, of which 2 survive.

=== Layout ===
The mosque covers an area of land measuring 135 feet 6 inches by 127 feet 6 inches. It is constructed of brick masonry and rendered with plaster and is a massive structure representing a transitional phase of the architecture between the Lodi and the Mughal periods. It has two entrances through deeply recessed arched gateways on its north and east sides. A flight of four steps in each gateway leads down to the main courtyard, measuring 123 feet by 83 feet. The courtyard was originally enclosed by rows of cells on its north and south, some portion of which still exists. On the east, along the gate, is a 17-foot-wide platform on which stands an enclosure consisting of an octagonal domed tomb and some other modern graves.

In the center of the courtyard a tank for ablution measuring 31 feet 5 inches by 26 feet 3 inches, is now much repaired. A modern roof of reinforced Badaun and elsewhere in the subcontinent gives us an idea of their gradual development and the perfection which was achieved during the Mughal period.

== Design ==
=== Interior embellishment ===
The mosque stands out uniquely for its frescoes, which are significant for their perfect technique and variety of subjects. The mosque featured the earliest dated Iranian motif in Mughal architecture.

"These paintings are unrivalled in Pakistan and perhaps in India "for their delicacy and lively variety" and for their harmonious golden tone, which is due only in part to age."

— Mortimer Wheeler, Five thousand years of Pakistan

"Never in the history of the architecture of the early Moghul period do we find such an extensive and exclusive use of this type of decoration. The endless variety of geometric floral and inscriptional designs spread over the interior surface in a subtle colour scheme is a characteristic not seen elsewhere."

— Ahmad Nabi Khan, Pakistan archaeology no.7

The entire interior surface of the prayer chamber is covered with colourful fresco decoration. At the centre of the main dome is a medallion with radiating stellate and net forms rendered in stucco, completing the exquisite decor of the domes. Similar forms are seen in subsequent Mughal architecture.

The ceilings of tomb Itimad-ud-Daula, with their richly polychromed net vaulting and stellate forms, are a more refined version of those at Maryam Zamani mosque. The spectacularly painted prayer chamber of Wazir Khan mosque and its interior, as well as the central pishtaq's recessed arch and stellate vaulting, are richly polychromed using a technique similar to that on Maryam Zamani mosque.

=== Inscriptions ===
The mosque features primarily four inscriptions of Quranic, and non-Quranic origin. An inscription over the northern gateway features a Persian inscription which reads:

God be thanked through whose grace, under the auspices of Her Majesty, this building was completed. The founder of the edifice, the place of salvation, is Queen Mariyam Zamani. For the completion of this edifice, which resembles paradise, I was thinking about when at last I found it in the words "What a fine mosque!"

The courtly mosque architecture of Jahangir's period thus bears the stamp of female patronage.

While the inscription over the eastern gateway reads, a prayer of the Empress Mariam-uz-Zamani for her son Jahangir:

May the Conqueror of the world, Emperor Nur-ud-Din Muhammad, shine in the world like the sun and moon, oh God!

Over an archway on the northern end of the mosque is a final inscription that reads:

So said the Prophet, may the mercy and blessings of God be upon him, "The faithful in a mosque are as fish in water!"

== Conservation ==
In Pakistan, the mosque has been encroached upon by several shops, and views of the mosque from the Akbari Gate of the Lahore Fort have been obstructed by illegally constructed tire shops. In July 2016, the Walled City of Lahore Authority announced that the shops would be removed, and the mosque would also be conserved and restored.

== Gallery ==
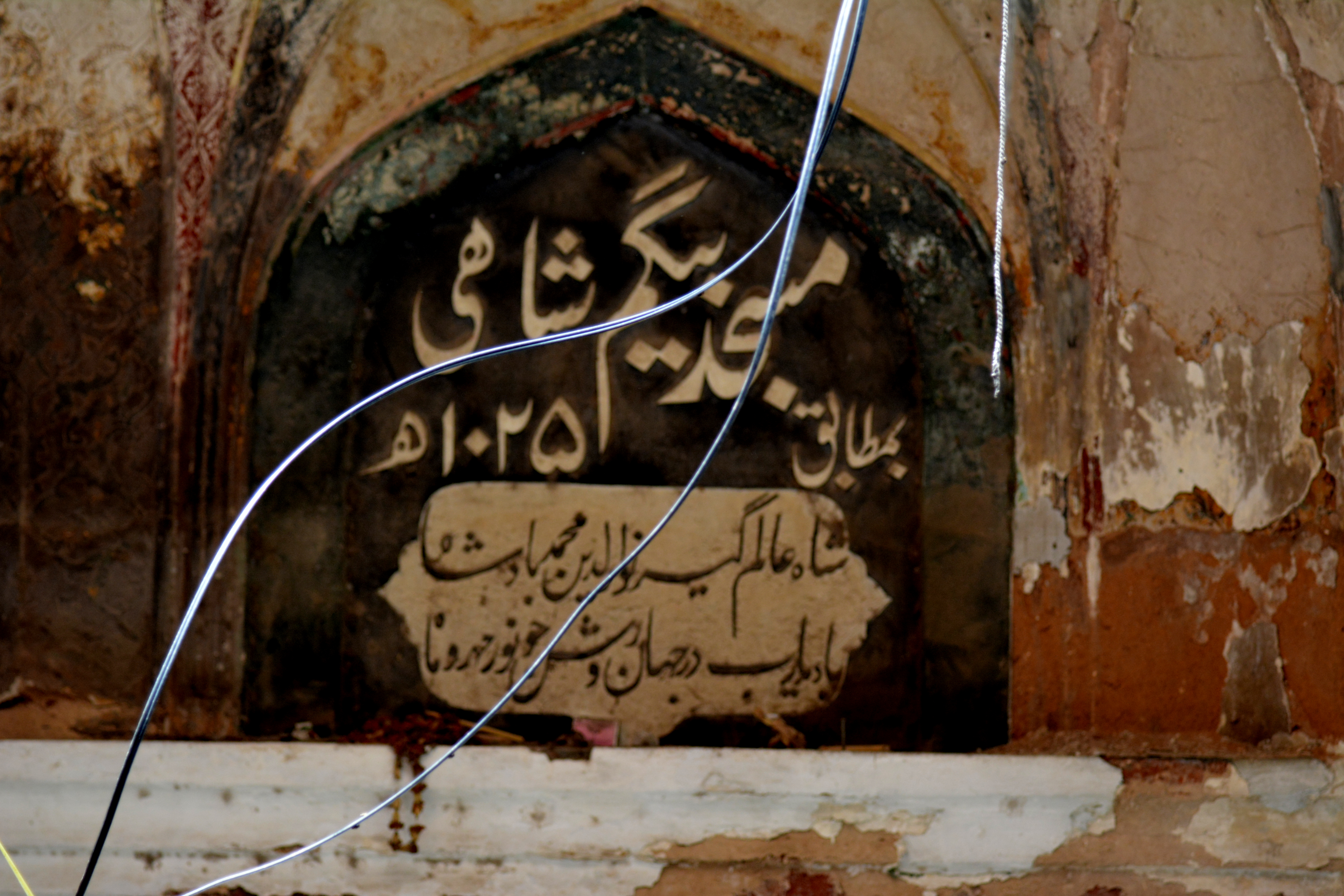
Entry sign

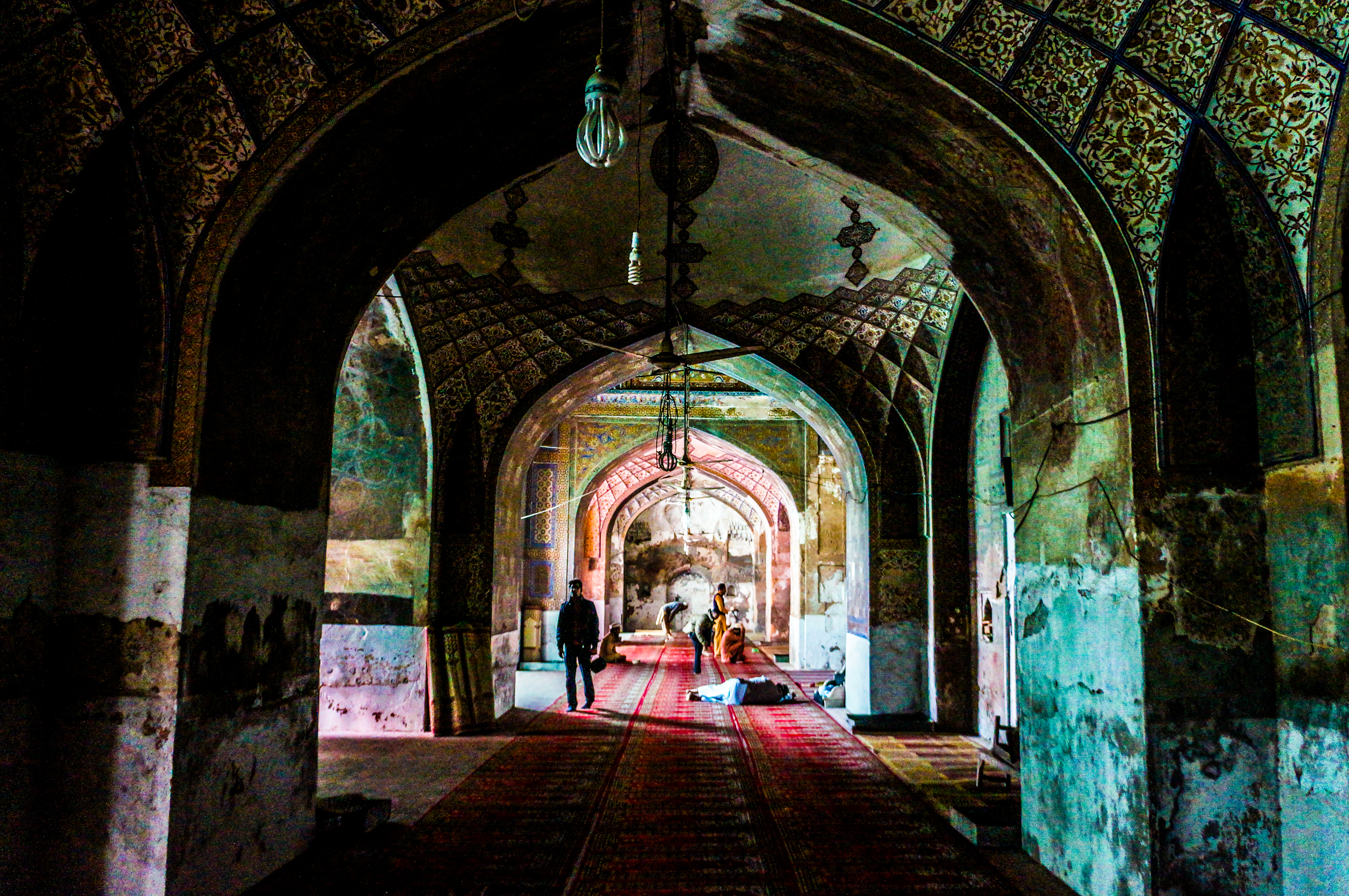
Inside Maryam Zamani

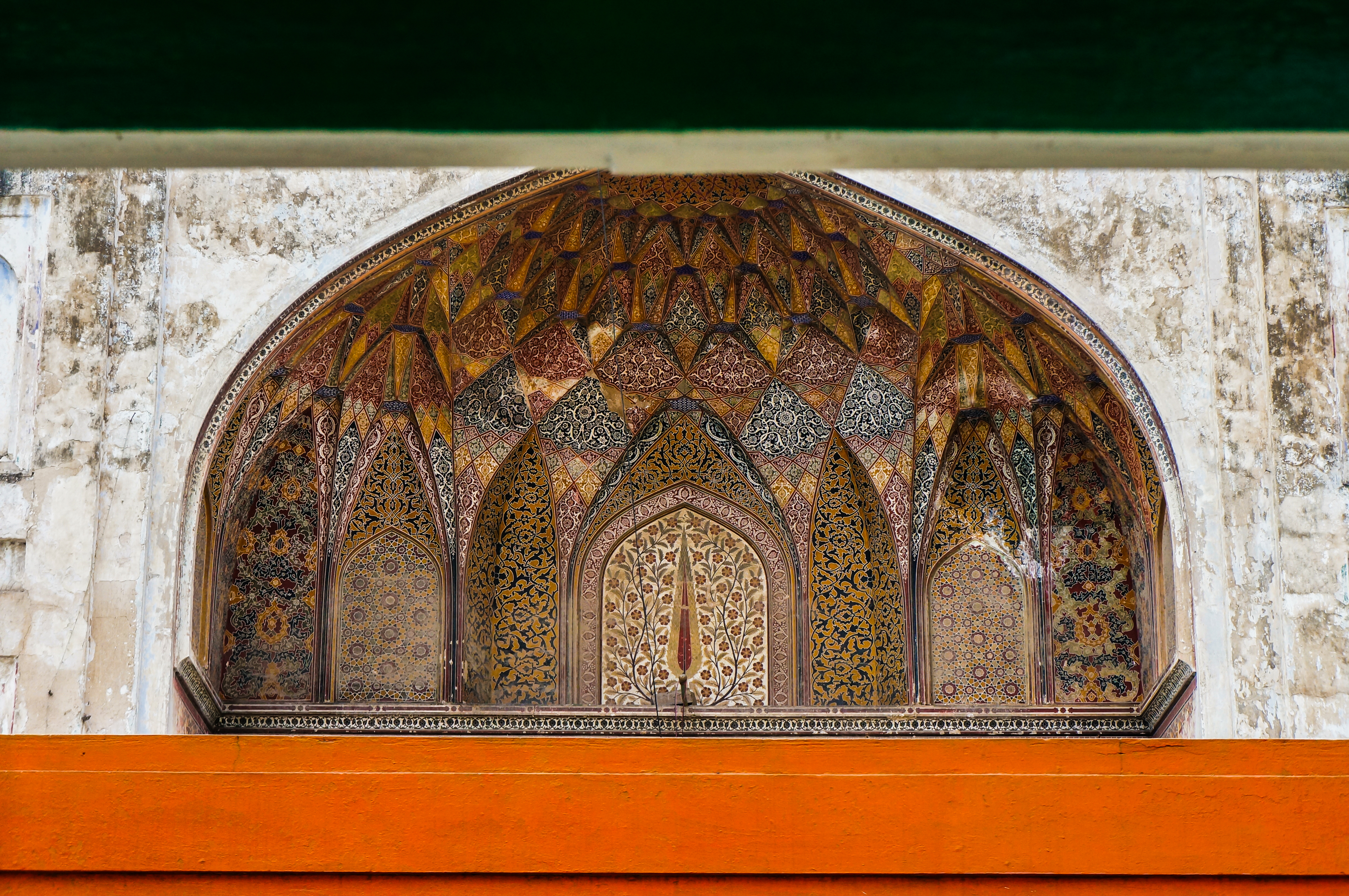
The mosque has richly embellished muqarnas.

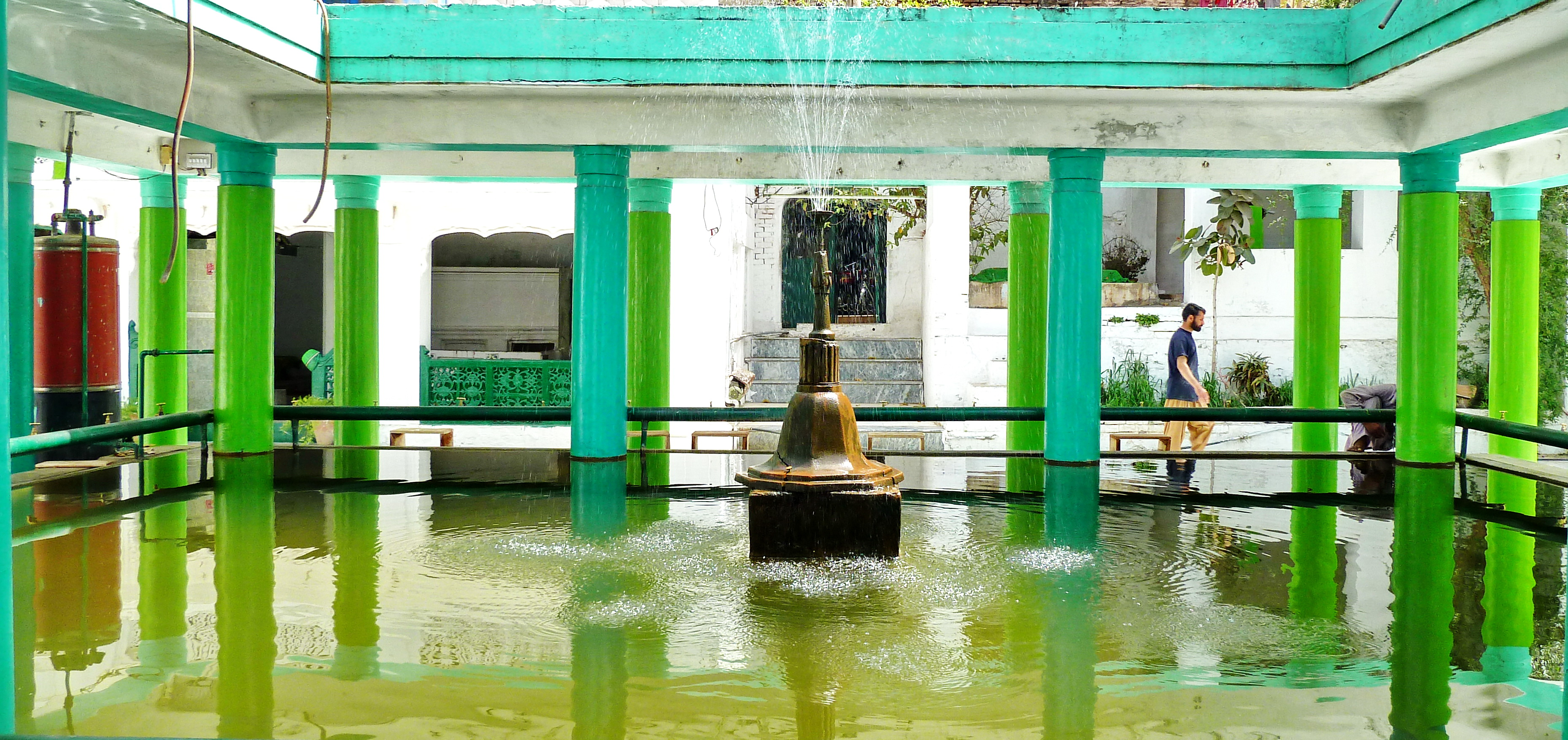
The central fountain and ablution area are covered by a new-build canopy.

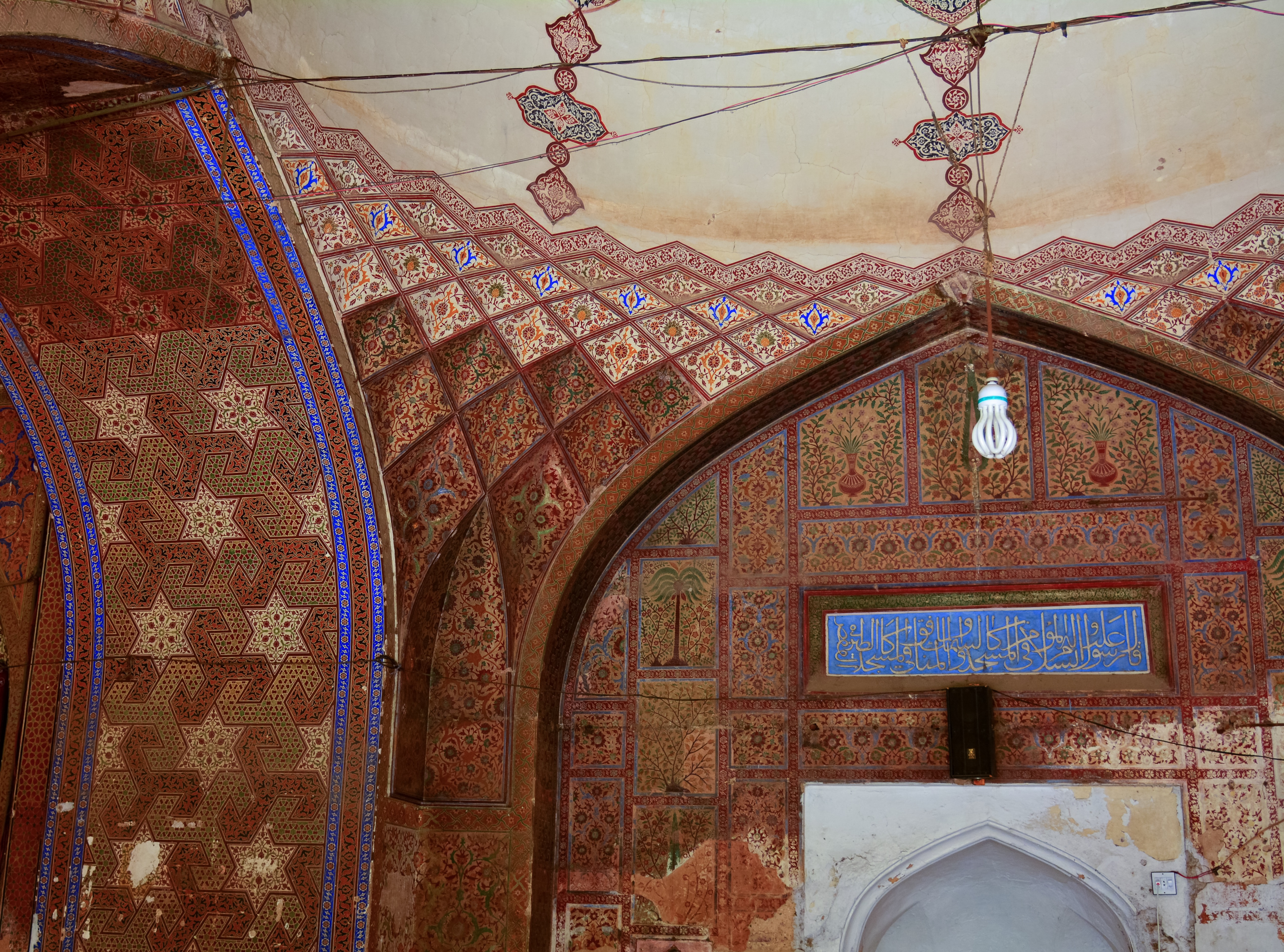

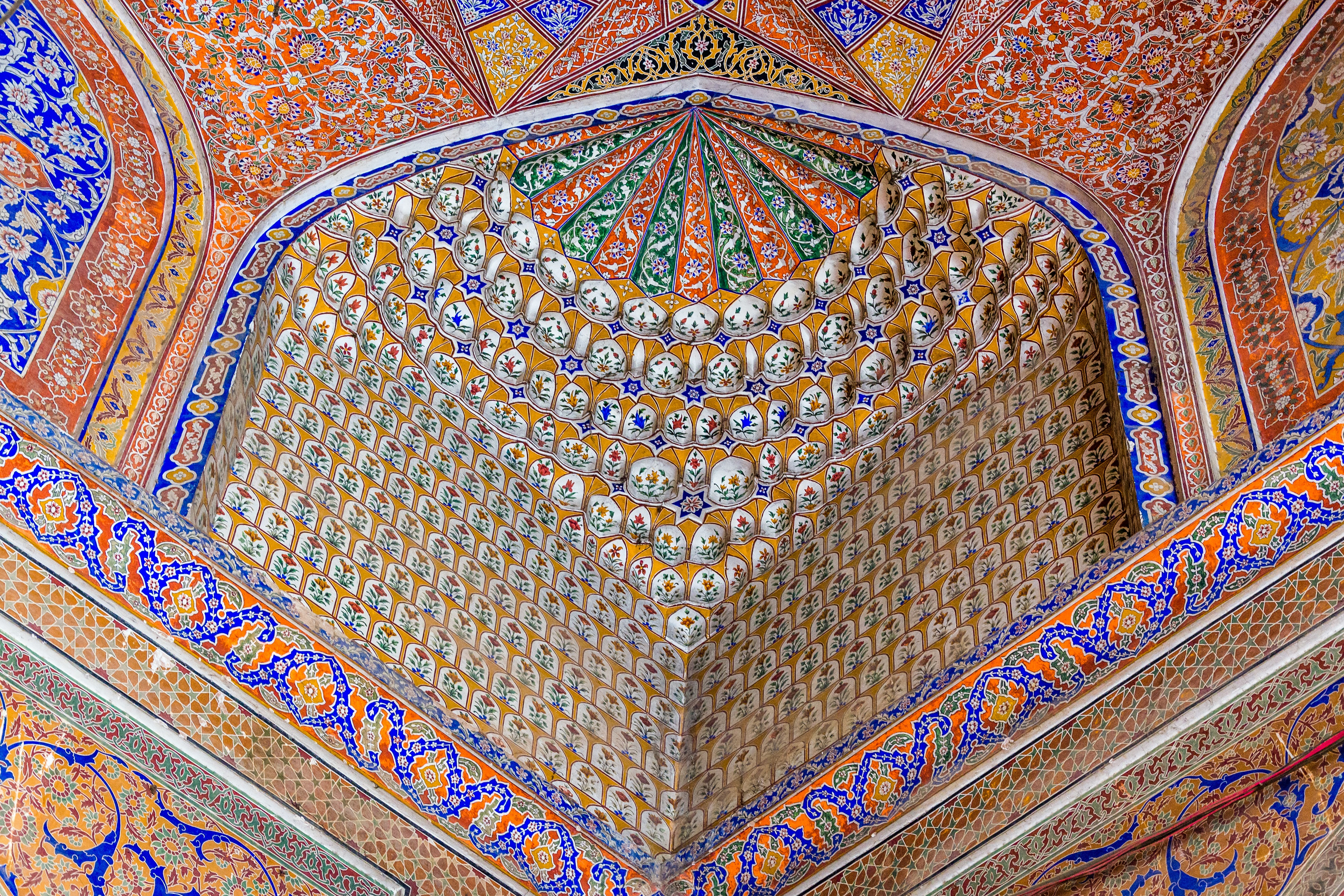

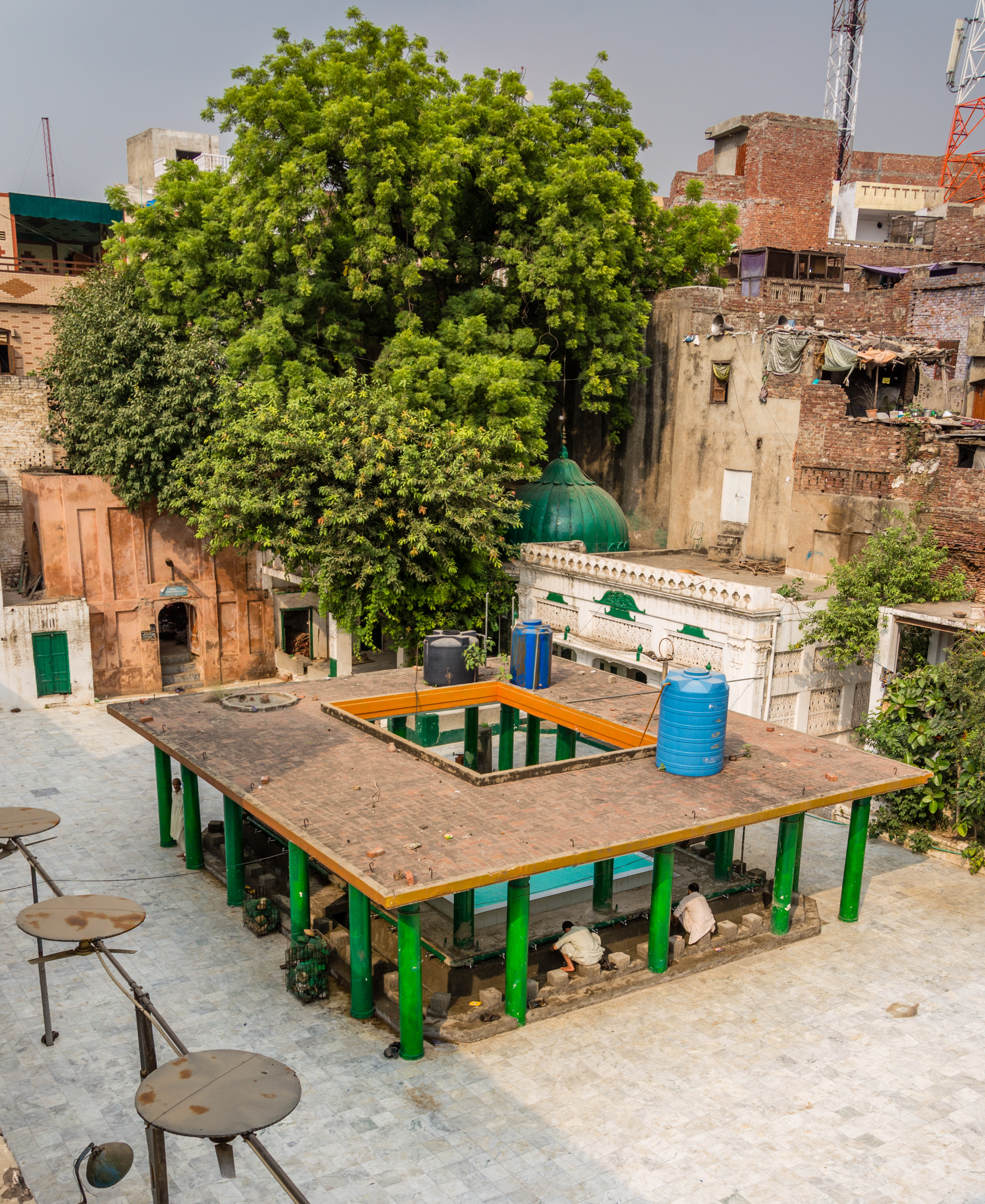
Ablution area

== Bibliography ==
- Khan, Ahmad Nabi (1970). Pakistan archaeology no.7.
- Asher, Catherine B. (Catherine Blanchard) (1992). Architecture of Mughal India. Cambridge; New York: Cambridge University Press. ISBN 978-0-521-26728-1.
