= Nilkanth temple (Mandu) =

Shiva temple in Madhya Pradesh, India

Nilkanth Mahadev Mandir
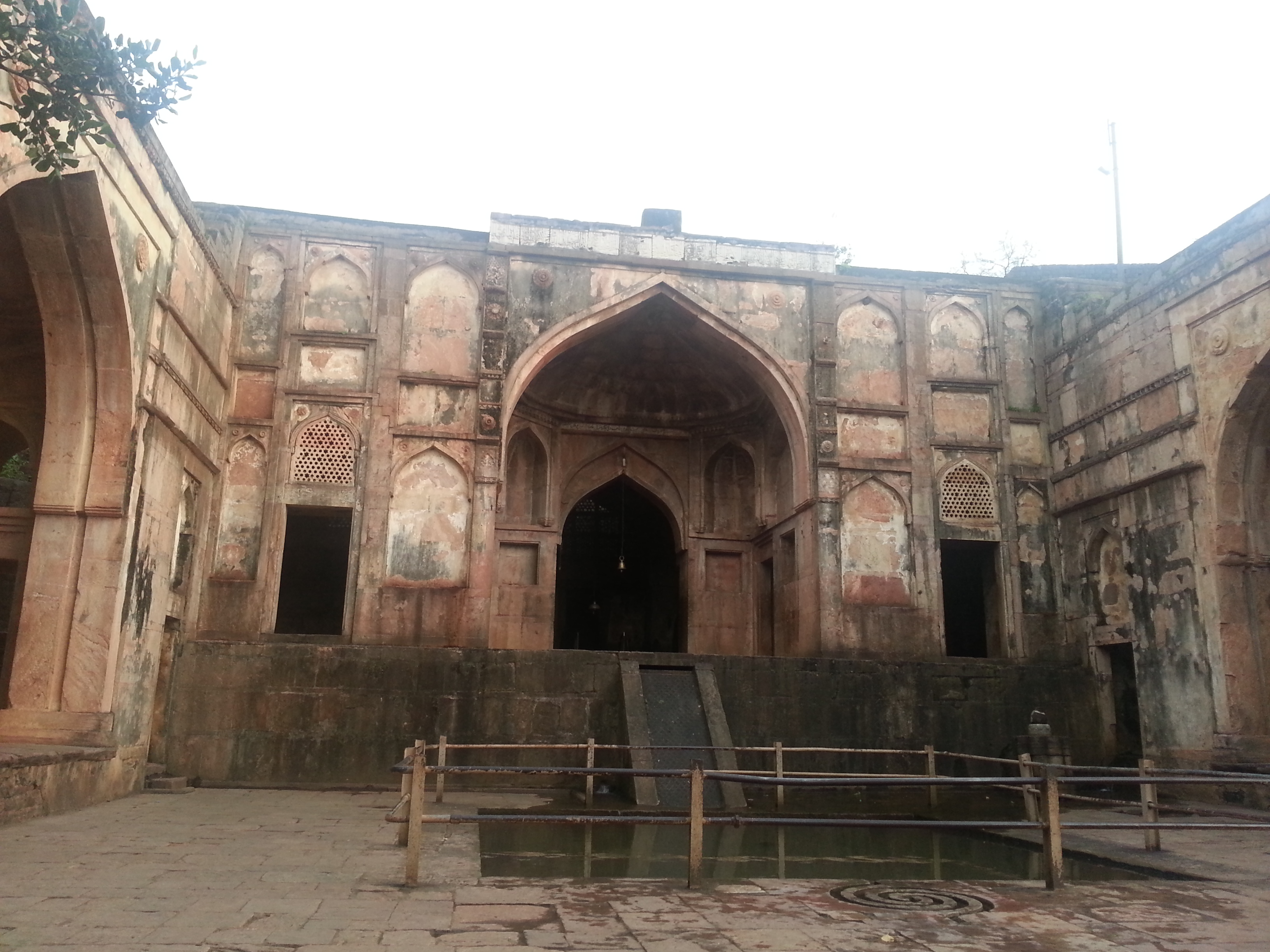

- Location in Mandu, Madhya Pradesh

Religion
- Affiliation: Hinduism
- District: Mandu
- Deity: Neelkanth (Shiva)
- Festival: Maha Shivaratri

Location
- Location: Near Nilkanth Valley
- State: Madhya Pradesh
- Country: India
- Coordinates: 22.3269524°N 75.3900973°E

Architecture
- Type: Mughal architecture
- Creator: Shah Badgah (Mughal Governor of Mandu)
- Established: 23 April 1574
- Completed: 11 April 1575 AD

Nilkanth Temple or Imarat-i-Dilkhusha (the heart-pleasing abode) is a Mughal architecture temple built on the orders of Mughal Emperor Akbar by the governor of Mandu, Shah Badgah in 1574 AD. Akbar commissioned this temple for his favourite wife, Empress Mariam-uz-Zamani, who was a follower of Hinduism.

The temple is dedicated to Shiva and is a popular Hindu pilgrimage site. It is surrounded by dense valleys and is adjacent to the mountain ranges of Nilkanth valleys.

== Background ==
The Nilkanth palace was built by the Mughal governor of Mandu, Shah Badgah in 1574 AD for the Mughal Empress Mariam-uz-Zamani, the favorite wife of Akbar, who in popular culture is known as Jodha Bai.

The name recorded of this palace in the Imperial Mughal documents is 'Imarat-i-Dilkhusha' (the heart-pleasing abode). It became the favorite retreat place of the eldest surviving son of Emperor Akbar and Empress Mariam-uz-Zamani, Jahangir.

== History ==
The present structure was built on an ancient shrine of Shiva. The original name of the building survived through the last three centuries despite the Mughal character and architecture of the palace, as the palace temple co-existed. After the destruction of the temples during the invasions through the 12th and 13th centuries, this structure was externally made to appear like a Mughal building through the reign of Akbar, however, it encompassed both the palace and the temple (ancient shrine).

In 1617, as noted by Jahangir in Tuzk-e-Jahangiri, he celebrated his birthday with his mother in this palace of hers, fondly calling it as Imarat-i-Dilkhusha (the heart-pleasing abode).
