= Rahīmī =

16–17th century Indian trading ship

History
- Name: Rahīmī
- Owner: Mariam-uz-Zamani
- Ordered: In 1590 by Emperor Akbar
- Launched: 1593
- Completed: 1592
- Maiden voyage: 1593
- Out of service: September 1613
- Fate: Burned in Goa harbor

General characteristics
- Class & type: Sailing ship
- Displacement: 1000–1500 tons
- Length: 153 ft (46.6 m)
- Beam: 42 ft (12.8 m)
- Depth: 31 ft (9.4 m)

The Rahīmī (lit. 'belonging to the most merciful/dedicated to God') was a Mughal trade vessel, running from 1593 to 1613. It is known alternately as the Great Remee, Reheme, Remy, Remee, or Beheme. It was built under the patronage of Empress Mariam-uz-Zamani, chief consort of Emperor Akbar and mother of Emperor Jahangir.

The Rahimi was the largest of the Indian ships trading in the Red Sea. It had a sail area so vast that it was identifiable to sailors from miles away and was known to Europeans as, the great pilgrimage ship.

One of the most controversial aspects of "The Rahimi's" passage was the amount her officers had to pay the Portuguese for a cartaz. The Rahimi's "sum" became, in English reckoning, a standard by which other vessels were taxed. The rates set down were so that "every ship should be taxed to pay for her freedom," and the Rahimi was used as a standard, apparently, because she was so large and her tax was set at 15,000 rials.

== Background ==
The owner and patron of the ship was Mariam-uz-Zamani. During the reigns of Akbar and Jahangir, she had ships for trade and Haj pilgrims built at the Khizri Darwaza on the Ravi River near Lahore. This place was later renamed by Maharaja Ranjit Singh as Sheranwala Darwaza.

The Rahimi was homeported in Surat but often traveled to Jeddah, the port near Mecca on the Red Sea, where she carried merchandise for the vendors of the holy city and trafficked in pilgrims on various parts of their journey.

== Trade and pilgrimage ==
Mariam-uz-Zamani was the earliest recorded woman who directly participated in overseas trade and commerce. The Rahimi was owned by Mariam-uz-Zamani, a Hindu princess by birth with a "Moorish" title who was the Empress Mother of one of the most powerful empires in the world, but she was in no way immune from the dangers of the business. No other noblewoman on record seems to have been as adventurous a trader as the empress mother, however, and no trader's ship (especially the Rahimi) seems to have gotten into as much trouble as hers. The repeated recorded captures of the empress mother's ships, and not those of most others, revealed the involvement of Indians in overseas commerce and the active involvement of Mughal noblewomen in trade.

Mariam-uz-Zamani built ships both for commercial and pilgrimage purposes. Her greatest ship, the Rahimi, was a conspicuous vessel with a large sail area in the Red Sea and was, in fact, the only ship known to Europeans as "the greatest pilgrimage ship."

Until the eighteenth century, Mecca was the location of one of the world's great commercial fairs, which drew products from Europe, Arabia, and Asia, many of which passed through the central port of Mocha Merchants from India, for example, often combined their pilgrimages with business trips, and Mughal emperors saw the pilgrimage as a way to solidify political alliances. Not only did emperors send goods for trade, but for whatever reasons — religious and non-religious — they dispatched goods and money to be distributed among the needy as well."

The local Sharifs of Mecca were the recipients of substantial Mughal largesse, and the financial assistance rendered to them brought goodwill for Muslim pilgrims from India and favors, when needed, for the imperial court. Finally, the pilgrimage to Mecca occasionally turned up a holy relic for Mughal India, as in the case of an impression of the Prophet's foot, which was brought from Mecca to Ahmedabad and housed in a magnificent memorial. The pilgrimage ship was thus a common item on Indian Ocean seas, and safe passage across the water was a highly sensitive issue.

=== Emperor Akbar and the Portuguese ===
The Mughal Empire was landlocked until 1572. It was only with Akbar's conquest of Gujarat in 1572–73 that both the Mughals and Portuguese came face-to-face. The Mughals became a considerable concern for the Portuguese. It wasn't the other way around.

The Portuguese were well aware of Akbar's formidable military capacity, and they tried to stress their friendship with the Emperor as best they could. Akbar saw through their pretence but preferred to match theirs with his own. The mighty Portuguese sea power influenced Akbar's pretence. Never did the Portuguese take up arms against him. He kept them guessing until the end of his days. Nevertheless, there were hostilities from time to time, and these figure largely in Portuguese sources.

Most offensive, however, especially to orthodox Muslims, was the Portuguese development of a pass system. To travel in Portuguese waters, each Asian ship had to obtain a cartaz or pass by paying customs at a Portuguese port or by keeping an agent in residence there. If a ship did not carry the pass or was in violation of the conditions listed, it could be seized by any Portuguese agent on patrol. Particularly distasteful was that each pass carried stamped on it pictures of the Virgin Mary and Jesus, and for orthodox Muslims to travel under such conditions, especially if on pilgrimage, "would mean to countenance idolatry." Often, for strict interpreters of Islamic law, this meant the periodic suspension of the obligation of pilgrimage; although, given the free religious milieu of the Akbar and Jahangir eras, pilgrimage to Mecca did continue at a healthy rate despite the religious problems of the journey. Despite challenges, relations with the Portuguese were mostly amicable throughout Akbar's rule and continued well until Jahangir's reign.

Akbar's empress consort Mariam-uz-Zamani herself, however, remained untouched by the apostasy issue. There is no record of any question being raised about her position as a ship's owner under the Portuguese Pass, neither her religious status as a wife and then the mother of a Muslim emperor nor the Hindu tradition of her birth seems to have been jeopardized by her involvement in sea trade in Christian waters. Rather, her status as a sequestered financier allowed her both the adventure of overseas trade and protection from religious restrictions such an enterprise might entail.

== East India Company ==
English interest in India began to take shape at the time of the defeat of the Spanish Armada in 1588. In 1600, piqued by the success of the Portuguese in the spice trade with India, the English formed the chartered English East India Company and sent a few reconnaissance voyages to India before dispatching, in 1607, an unusually accomplished ambassador in William Hawkins, along with his agent, William Finch.

William Hawkins arrived at Jahangir's court at Agra "very richly clad," wearing apparel of "scarlet and violet," his cloak "lined with taffeta and embroidered with silver lace," a suitably high idea of his own importance, and carrying a letter of introduction from King James, rather perplexingly written in Spanish.

William Hawkins was a fluent Turki speaker and received immediate and familiar attention from the emperor. Jahangir was delighted to be able to converse with a foreigner in the old language. He greeted Hawkins warmly and invited him to come daily to the palace for talks and drinks, and he even bestowed on him the very generous post of 400 horses in the imperial service.

Finding his name unaccountably difficult to pronounce, Jahangir offered Hawkins the much more suitable title of Khan, and Hawkins Khan settled into courtly life at Agra, dressing in the "Mohammeddan manner" of the Mughal noblemen, and even marrying Mariam, an Armenian Christian woman who had been living as Jahangir's ward in his immense zenana and whom Jahangir chose for him as a wife.

== Relations with the English ==
William Hawkins arrived in Agra with letters for Jahangir in order to solicit from him specific trading privileges. Despite his encouraging reception, however, Hawkins's mission would not succeed. The Portuguese were adamant about not sharing their trade in India and, still strong at court during this period, used their influence to intrigue against the Hawkins mission.

William Hawkins himself, despite his fluency in Turki and his perseverance, is arrogant and rash, refusing to play by the rules of the Mughal court, where nuance and finesse are preferred to intransigence. Even so, Hawkins may have been able to secure some firmans from the ever-generous Jahangir had his agent, William Finch, not made a grave error in judgment by crossing Mariam-uz-Zamani's path.

In late 1610 or early 1611, when Mariam-uz-Zamani's ship was being loaded for Mocha, she sent one of her agents to buy indigo in Bayana (an important center of indigo production 50 miles southwest of Agra) to be put aboard the ship for sale in Mocha. Just as the deal was being completed, however, the English trader, William Finch arrived and did what no Indian would dare to do. He offered "a little more than she should have given," got the indigo, and made off with it. When Mariam-uz-Zamani heard that she had been outbid by an Englishman, she was furious and complained to her son, the emperor, who made the English representative at the court, William Hawkins, suffer for a long time after that. William Finch, on the other hand, struggled to sell the acquired indigo in Lahore. His hasty decision to outbid the charismatic Mariam-uz-Zamani may have contributed to his difficulties there.

William Hawkins had instructed William Finch to return to Agra as soon as he had disposed of his goods, but the latter had come to the conclusion that the prospects of English trade in India were hopeless and informed Hawkins that he planned to sell the indigo in Syrian city, and then travel back to England. Believing that Finch's real intention was to "run away," Hawkins discreetly sent a letter of power of attorney to a Jesuit missionary in Lahore, authorizing him to seize all goods carried by Finch, including Indigo. Nicholas Ufflet was then sent to Lahore to take over the indigo.

William Hawkins himself had to suffer for a long time after leaving the Mughal court, mentioning that he had no choice but to currie favour with the Jesuits to obtain safe conduct that would allow him and his wife to travel to Goa, from where they would embark for Europe. This initial plan, however, changed when Hawkins prompted a final attempt to persuade the emperor to grant a firman and for his rehabilitation in court, but he was unsuccessful and finally left Agra on 2 November 1611: "To stay, I would not be amongst these faithless infidels."

The repercussions were so severe, that in 1612, English Captain Jourdain noted, " the Empress's ship, the Rahimi, was bound for Mocha, & the [ local ] merchants would not lade their goods aboard until we [Europeans] were gone from the country."

In 1612, a few months before Captain Best arrived, the English hijacked Rahimi. Six English ships hijacked roughly ten ships departing from the Red Sea ports. Rahimi was one of them, and the British swiftly pillaged all of them after transporting them to a nearby harbor. Rahimi was ransomed for 4,000 pounds.

== Seizure by the Portuguese ==
"The Great Mogul's mother was a great adventurer, which caused the Great Mogul to drive the Portingals out of this place."

— William Foster, Letters Received By The East India Company (Vol II)

During the reign of Jahangir, the Portuguese were threatened by the presence of other European traders, especially the English, in the Mughal Court. The Portuguese, who had been trading on Indian shores for almost a decade, were extremely apprehensive of the new English interlopers who sought trading rights from the Emperor.

In order to pressurise the Emperor to expel European rivals from the Mughal court, the Portuguese challenged Jahangir’s authority and prestige by targeting a ship owned by his mother, Empress Mother Mariam-uz-Zamani.

William Hawkins noted that on 1 February 1609, he witnessed a great stir touching Empress Mother's ship as it prepared to carry goods to Mocha, an Arabian port south of Mecca at the Red Sea's entrance. The Portuguese threatened to abscond with the ship to Diu unless Mariam-uz-Zamani paid an exorbitant fee for a cartaz or pass. It is recorded that the Portuguese demanded 1,00,000 mamudies for their cartaz and then 20,000; eventually, to forestall violence, the two sides were able to compromise on a much smaller payment of around 1,000 Rials.

The incident in particular that permanently turned the Mughals away from their early European friends, the Portuguese, was the seizure and burning of Mariam-uz-Zamani's greatest pilgrimage ship, the Rahimi, in September 1613. Although she was carrying the necessary Portuguese pass and was apparently not in violation of any of the terms posted on it, still, out of pure greed or anger at the new Mughal friendship with the English, the Portuguese acted "contrary to their pass" and carried off "the Rahimi" with all of her richly laden cargo, worth 100,000 pounds, equivalent to today's currency, half a billion rupees, and the approximately 700 passengers still on board to Goa. Jeronimo de Azevedo celebrated the capture of the Rahimi as "worthy prey that was brought and for giving the Mughals a cause of sorrow."

When it became clear that the Portuguese had no immediate intention of returning the Empress Mother's ship, Jahangir sent Muqarrab Khan, his governor, down to stop all shipping traffic at Surat, the major Indian fort for seagoing trade, and to lay siege to the Portuguese city of Daman. The Jesuit church in Agra, which had been built under Akbar, was closed, and all allowances to Portuguese priests in Mughal India were suspended.

The entire Mughal court, as well as the city of Surat, is in an uproar, and the tumult and outcry at the Mughal court are unprecedented. In the words of Findly, "Rahimi incident was the only act of piracy against India, which, on record, evoked a severe and intense response from the Mughal government."

These extreme actions taken by Jahangir are unusual, for the Mughal court has grown used to the rapacious brutality of the Portuguese and has usually reacted by ignoring it or accommodating it if possible. But this is the Rahimi, which has been seized by the Portuguese, Mariam-uz-Zamani's flagship pilgrim ship, and empress mother demands retribution. This is an altogether unusual situation, demonstrating the great cultural upheavals and the tectonic changes that are shaping the Mughal empire: this is a Hindu empress's Muslim ship, carrying Hajj pilgrims in Christian waters patrolled by the Portuguese armada.

The Portuguese tried their influence for peace and later agreed to compensate the Mughal government for the loss of the Empress Mother's vessel and "to grant certain additional passes to native vessels proceeding to the Red Sea," but since the agreement was contingent upon the expulsion of the English, Jahangir balked. Eventually, an agreement was made by the emperor by which the Portuguese had to pay "three lakhs of rupees for the ship taken," but the issue of English expulsion was left hanging as Jahangir became increasingly aware of English power at sea.

The Portuguese capture of Mariam-uz-Zamani's ship thus served to bring about a major change in the relationship between the two governments and was, by a fortunate accident, a substantial windfall for the English.

== Later incidents ==
When the Portuguese seized and burned an exceptionally large and well-known pilgrimage ship called Rahimi belonging to the Empress Mother Mariam-uz-Zamani, an era of overseas trading came to an end. The Portuguese continued to maintain a presence at the Mughal court but became a relatively insignificant factor in trade, and the scales tipped in favour of the English.

Tension remained between the English and the Portuguese, especially at the lower levels, and Jahangir himself reported on the sea fight between the two in the Swally channel in January of 1615, during which the English burned most of the Portuguese ships.

Mariam-uz-Zamani carried on with her commercial and pilgrimage ships despite losing her greatest pilgrimage ship, the Rahimi. She was in command of a fleet of ships. In 1617, two English pirates tried to seize Empress Mother's ship, which was returning from the Red Sea with numerous hajjis and valuable cargo, but in the nick of time, the ship was rescued.

In the words of Thomas Roe, the English Ambassador in the Mughal Court,

"Sir Robert Rich and one Phillope Barnardoe sett out two shipps to take Piratts, which is growne a Common Pretence of beeing Piratts. They missed their entrance into the Red sea (which was their dessigne), and came for India, gaue Chase to the Queene Mothers Juncke, and, but that God sent in our Fleete, had taken and rifled her. If they had prospered in their ends, either at Mocha or here, your goods and our Persons had answered it. I ordered the seisure of the shipps, Prises, and goods, and converted them to your vse; and must now tell you if you bee not round in some Course with these men you will haue the seas full and your trade in India is vtterly lost and our liues exposed to Pledge in the hands of Moores."

— Thomas Roe, The Embassy

After the loss of her greatest pilgrimage ship, the Rahimi, the Empress Mother then ordered the building of an even larger ship with 62 guns and the placement of over 400 musketeers. It was named "Ganj-i-Sawai" and in its day was the most fearsome ship in the sea, with the objective of trade and taking pilgrims to Mecca, and on the way back, converting all the goods into gold and silver and bringing back the pilgrims.

== See also ==
- Sloop
- Ganj-i-Sawai
- White Ship
- Chinese treasure ship
- Javanese jong
- Polacca
