= Paronkh =

Village in Uttar Pradesh, India

- Village
- Location in Uttar Pradesh, India
- Coordinates: 27.27622°N 78.95725°E
- Country: India
- State: Uttar Pradesh
- District: Mainpuri
- Tehsil: Mainpuri

Area
  - Total: 11.637 km^{2} (4.493 sq mi)

Population (2011)
  - Total: 2,413
  - Density: 207.4/km^{2} (537.0/sq mi)
- Time zone: UTC+5:30 (IST)

Paronkh (Paroṅkh) is a village in Mainpuri block of Mainpuri district, Uttar Pradesh. A minor battle took place here in 1562; it was the first time the Mughal emperor Akbar personally commanded troops in battle. There are ruins of an old fort in the village. As of 2011, Paronkh has a population of 2,413, in 411 households.

== Geography ==
Paronkh is located on the Isan River, 10 km southwest of Mainpuri. In the village there is a mound, or khera, with the ruins of an old fort.

== History ==
Paronkh was the site of the Battle of Paronkh, in early 1562. This was a minor battle fought between a "punitive force" under the Mughal emperor Akbar, consisting of 200 men and 200 elephants, and a group of about 400 local brigands from a group of eight villages in pargana Sakit. The Akbarnama, written by Akbar's official court historian Abu'l-Fazl ibn Mubarak, contains a narrative account of the battle. Although it was a minor event, Paronkh is notable for being the first battle that Akbar personally led troops in.

== Archaeology ==
During an exploration of Mainpuri district in the late 1970s, the archaeologist L. M. Wahal discovered an archaeological site at Paronkh where there were artifacts attributed to the Northern Black Polished Ware culture (c. 700-200 BCE).

== Demographics ==
As of 2011, Paronkh had a population of 2,413, in 411 households. This population was 53.4% male (1,289) and 46.6% female (1,124). The 0-6 age group numbered 386 (204 male and 182 female), or 16.0% of the total population. 402 residents were members of Scheduled Castes, or 16.7% of the total.

The 1981 census recorded Paronkh as having a population of 1,920 people, in 269 households.

The 1961 census recorded Paronkh as comprising 2 hamlets, with a total population of 1,147 people (622 male and 525 female), in 215 households and 209 physical houses. The area of the village was given as 927 acres.

== Infrastructure ==
As of 2011, Paronkh had 1 primary school and 1 primary health centre. Drinking water was provided by tap, well, hand pump, and tube well; there were no public toilets. The village had a post office and public library, as well as at least some access to electricity for residential and agricultural purposes. Streets were made of both kachcha and pakka materials.
