= Cartaz =

Portuguese naval license

The Cartaz (plural cartazes, in Portuguese) was a naval trade license or pass issued by the Portuguese Empire in the Indian Ocean during the sixteenth century (circa 1502–1750). Its name derives from the Portuguese term cartas, meaning letters. The British navicert system of 1939–45 shared similarities with it.

== Background ==
The licensing of vessels by the Portuguese was initiated by Prince Henry the Navigator in 1443, with the consent of the king and the Pope, when he decreed a monopoly on navigation in the west African coast, starting a Portuguese Mare clausum policy in the Atlantic Ocean. Ships began to be licensed by Portugal, which authorized and supported navigation, in exchange for part of the profits (usually 20%, "the fifth"), encouraging investment in exploration travels by Portuguese and foreigners.

== The cartazes ==
The "cartazes" licensing system was created in 1502 to control and enforce the Portuguese trade monopoly over a wide area in the Indian Ocean, taking advantage of local commerce: the cartaz was issued by the Portuguese at a low cost, granting merchant ships protection against pirates and rival states, which then abounded in these seas. However its main purpose was to ensure that merchants paid the tax in Portuguese trading posts, directing them to the feitorias in Goa, Malacca and Ormuz, guaranteeing its monopoly on the spice trade and other products.

Officially, no vessel was permitted to sail in the Indian coast without this document, risking losing their cargo, being attacked and even sunk by the Portuguese - mainly Muslim, Hindu and Malay merchant ships. Every year, during the monsoon, Portuguese fleets patrolled the coasts requiring this document. Later, as Portuguese lost influence, the issue of cartazes become in itself an important source of income for the crown.

== Trivia ==
The cartaz system eventually introduced a new word, kadalaas (കടലാസ്) to the Malayalam language of Kerala which is still used to denote any kind of paper. The same applies to the Thai word krà.dàːt (กระดาษ).
