= Ira Mukhoty =

Indian author

- Education: University of Cambridge
- Occupation: Author

Ira Mukhoty is an Indian author. She studied natural sciences at University of Cambridge.

== Career ==
Her book Heroines: Powerful Indian Women of Myth and History (2017, Aleph Books: ISBN 978-9384067496) tells the tales of mythical heroines including Draupadi and Radha, and "six real women who played extraordinary roles but who weren’t written into textbooks as were their male counterparts", including Jahanara Begum, Rani Laxmibai and Hazrat Mahal.

Her second book Daughters of the Sun: Empresses, Queens and Begums of the Mughal Empire which was about the disappeared women of the great Mughals, was published by Aleph Book Company on 25 April 2018. In 2020 she published Akbar: The Great Mughal (Aleph Book Company, ISBN 978-9389836042). A reviewer in the Asian Review of Books described it as "an ambitious work crafted with great imagination about how the past and the present intersect".

In 2021, her debut novel Song of Draupadi was published. The book reimagines Mahabharata through the narration of its women characters, particularly Draupadi.

In 2024, she published The Lion and The Lily: The Rise and Fall of Awadh which follows the rise and fall of Awadh (Oudh), an important Mughal subha which gained relative independence under the Nawabs of Awadh.

== Bibliography ==
=== Fiction ===
- Song of Draupadi: A Novel. (2021) ISBN 9789390652242

=== Non-fiction ===
- Heroines: Powerful Indian Women of Myth & History. (2017) ISBN 9789384067496
- Daughters of the Sun: Empresses, Queens and Begums of the Mughal Empire. (2018) ISBN 9789386021120
- Akbar: The Great Mughal. (2020) ISBN 9789389836042
- The Lion and The Lily: The Rise and Fall of Awadh. (2024) ISBN 9788119635979
