= Tuzk =

Tuzk (Urdu: تزک, also transcribed as Tuzuk) is a Persian word referring to the diary of a king. It may refer to one of the following autobiographies:

- Tuzk-e-Taimuri, supposed autobiography of Timur
- Tuzk-e-Babri, autobiography of Babur
- Tuzk-e-Jahangiri, autobiography of Jahangir
