= Malika-i-Jahan =

Malika-i-Jahan ("Queen of the World") was a title bestowed upon the chief consort of Muslim rulers of South Asia. It may refer to:

- Malika-i-Jahan (Alauddin Khalji) (13th–14th century) of Delhi Sultanate
- Malika Jahan (16th century), wife of the Mughal emperor Jahangir
- Mumtaz Mahal (1593–1631), queen of the Mughal emperor Shah Jahan
- Sahiba Mahal (died c. 1793), wife of the Mughal emperor Muhammad Shah
- Malek Jahan Khanom (1805–1873), Queen consort of the Qajar king Mohammad Shah
- Malekeh Jahan (1875–1947), queen consort and cousin of the Qajar king Mohammad Ali Shah
