= Nadiri =

Type of overcoat

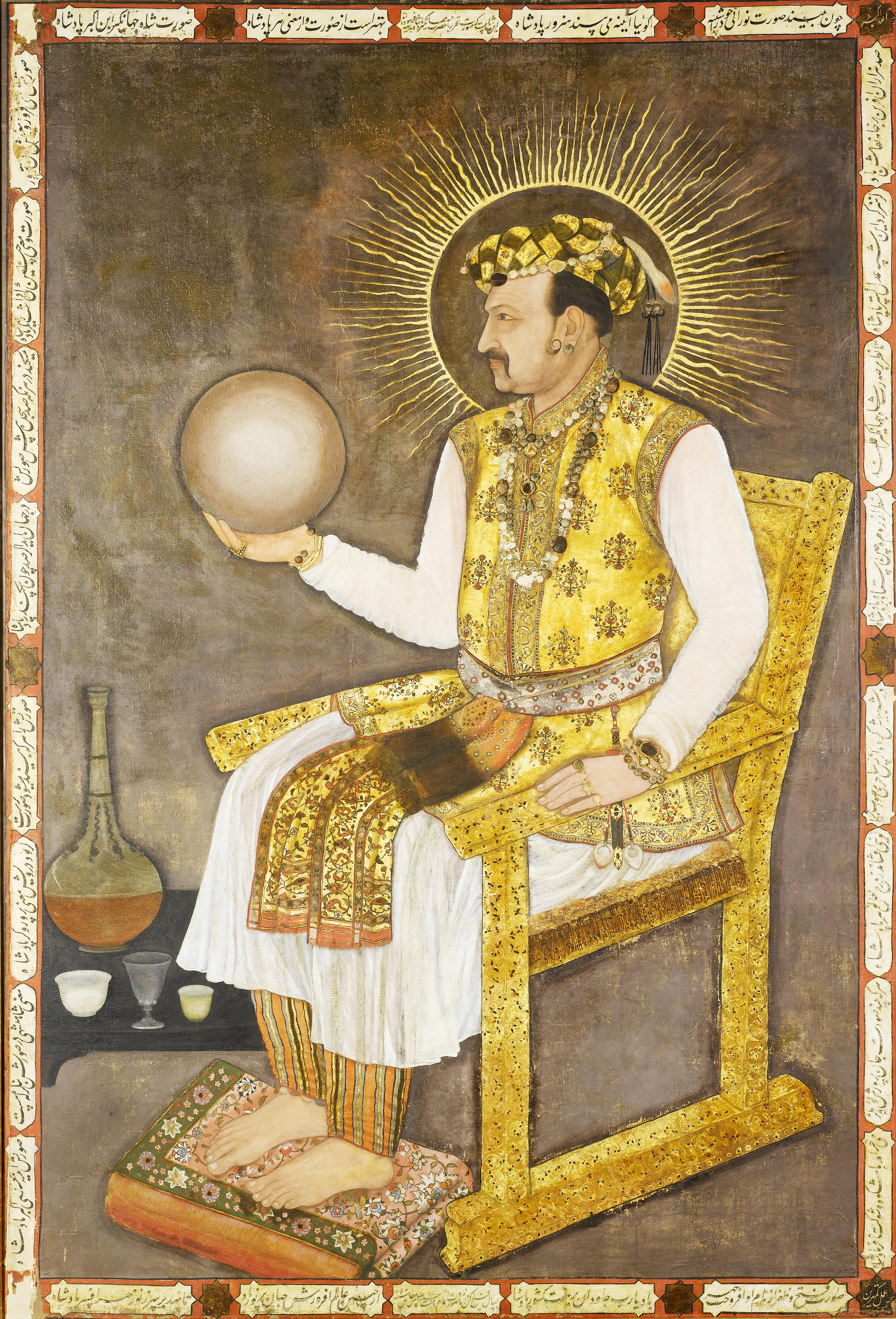
Jahangir holding a globe—he is dressed in nadiri.

Nadiri was a type of a overcoat that was specifically reserved for the Mughal emperor Jahangir (r. 1605–1627) and his esteemed courtiers. The vest was an invention of his own, which he had named 'Nadiri'. Nadiri was known as kurdi among the people in Persia. The term 'nadiri' was meant to refer to rarity.

== Style ==
The Nadiri is a sleeveless coat that extends down to the thighs and features buttons at the front. It was traditionally worn over the Qaba, a long coat with sleeves and buttons.

== Jahangir's fashion and artistic interests ==
According to historical records, Jahangir had a passion for fashion and his attire, including his turbans and jewelry, and tended to be more extravagant and ornate compared to the fashion sense of his father Akbar's era. Jahangir had a strong interest in art and architecture. He documented events, descriptions of flora and fauna, and daily life in his reign in his autobiography, the Jahangirnama. He also commissioned court painters like Ustad Mansur to create detailed artworks to accompany his writing. Jahangir adorned himself with magnificent clothing crafted from intricate silks and brocades. In addition, he introduced a variety of new dresses, including the nadiri, which he reserved for those whom he chose to grant it to.

Jahangir's fashion was closely monitored and emulated by the court. He issued a decree that specified certain textiles and garments to be made exclusively for his use. As a reward for their loyalty and service, the emperor bestowed selected courtiers with gifts of clothing and jewelry, including the nadiri that was designed by himself.

As stated in the emperor's memoir, Jahangir had a unique outfit consisting of nadiri, tus shawl, batugiriban, qaba made of Gujarati satin, chera, and waist-belt woven with silk and gold threads, which he kept for himself.

== Jahangir holding a globe ==
Mughal paintings have elements from Central Asia and Europe as well as Persian and Indian styles and methods. Mughal paintings spanning the 16th to 19th century depict various aspects of life during that period, including legendary tales, warfare, courtly activities, gardens, hunting, and wildlife.

Jahangir is depicted here [in the above image] wearing court attire, including a patterned sleeveless jacket that he dubbed nadiri ('rarity'). He is wearing two patkas (sashes) around his waist: the longer one is intricately embroidered with gold floral designs, while the shorter one is made of Rajasthani tie-dye fabric.
