= Baghsar Fort =

Ancient fort near Bhimber, Pakistan

- قلعہ باغ سر (Urdu)
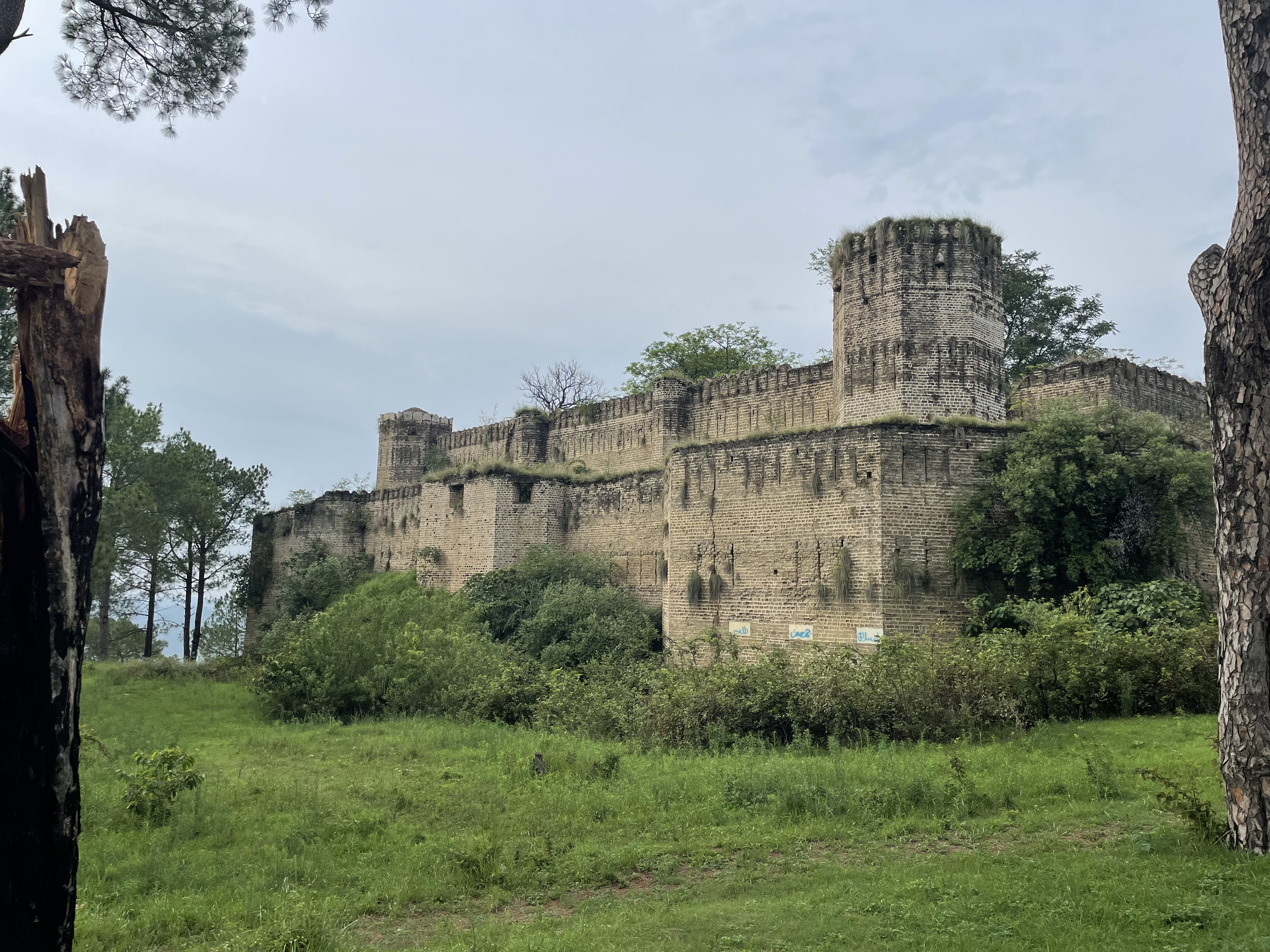
- Southern side of the fort, observation point visible.
- Interactive map of Baghsar Fort
- 33°02′22″N 74°12′22″E
- Location: Bhimber, Pakistan

Site notes
- Architectural styles: Indo-Islamic, Mughal

Baghsar Fort (Urdu: باغ سر قلعہ) is an ancient fort built in Samahni Valley near Bhimber, Pakistan, close to a place known as Baghsar. The fort was constructed by Mughal rulers. Some parts of it are currently closed to visitors, due to it being right beside the line of control between Pakistan and India.

== History ==
Very little knowledge is available about the true history of the fort. In the 15th century, Bhimber was under control of a local chieftain Jasrat, who is known to have constructed a series of forts in the region. Bhaghsar fort may have been first constructed during his reign. Later it came under control of the Chibh Kings of Chibhal, who may have re-constructed it with the help of Mughal architects and builders. Godfrey Vigne, an English traveller who extensively travelled through Kashmir, mentioned it as Bagh Sar castle in his book.

== Layout ==
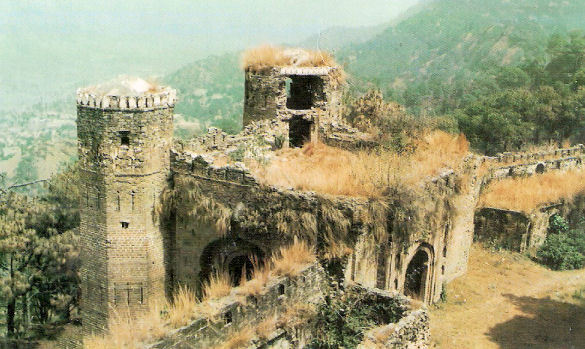
View of Baghsar Fort main gate.

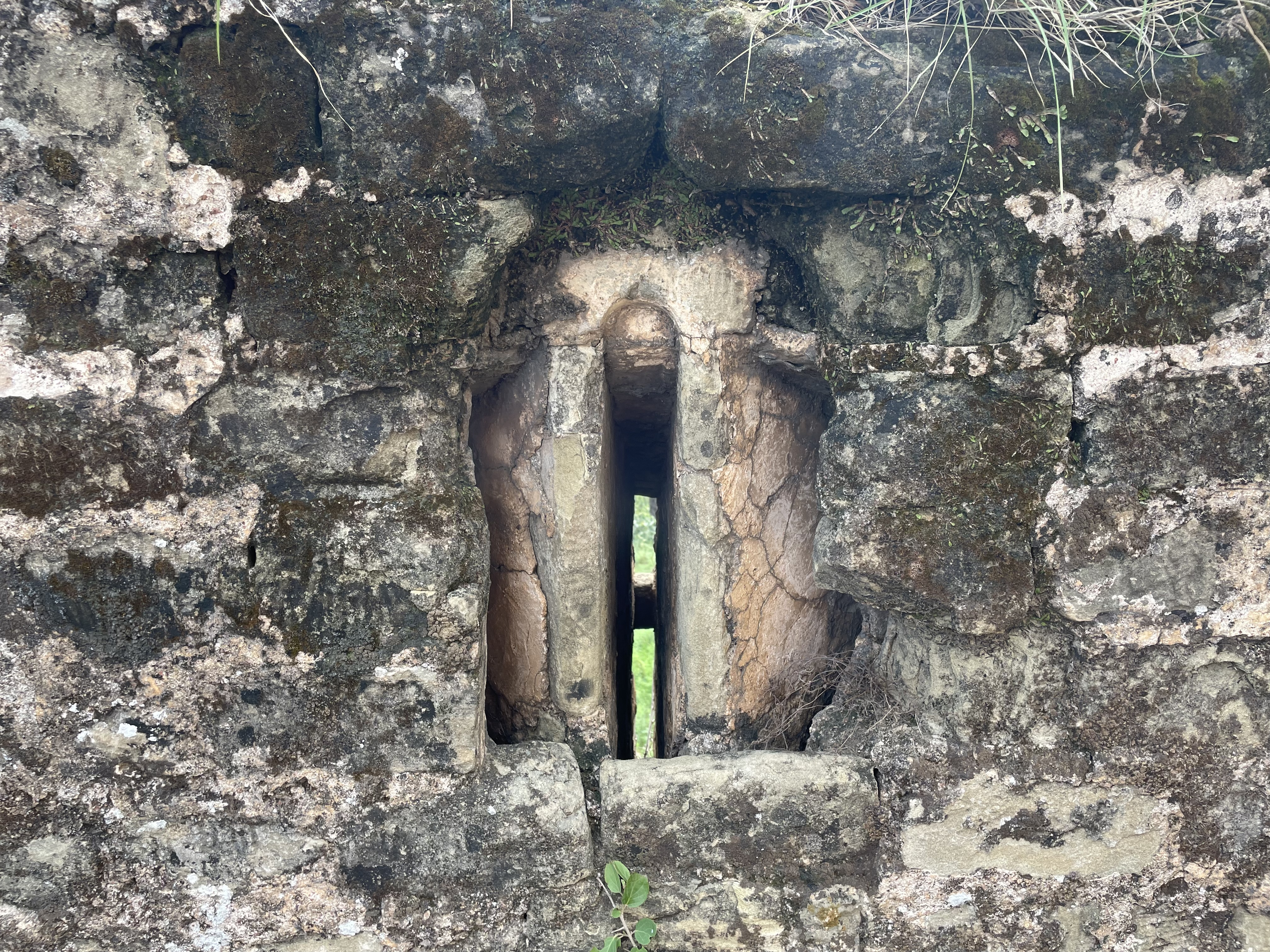
Embrasures visible in boundary wall.

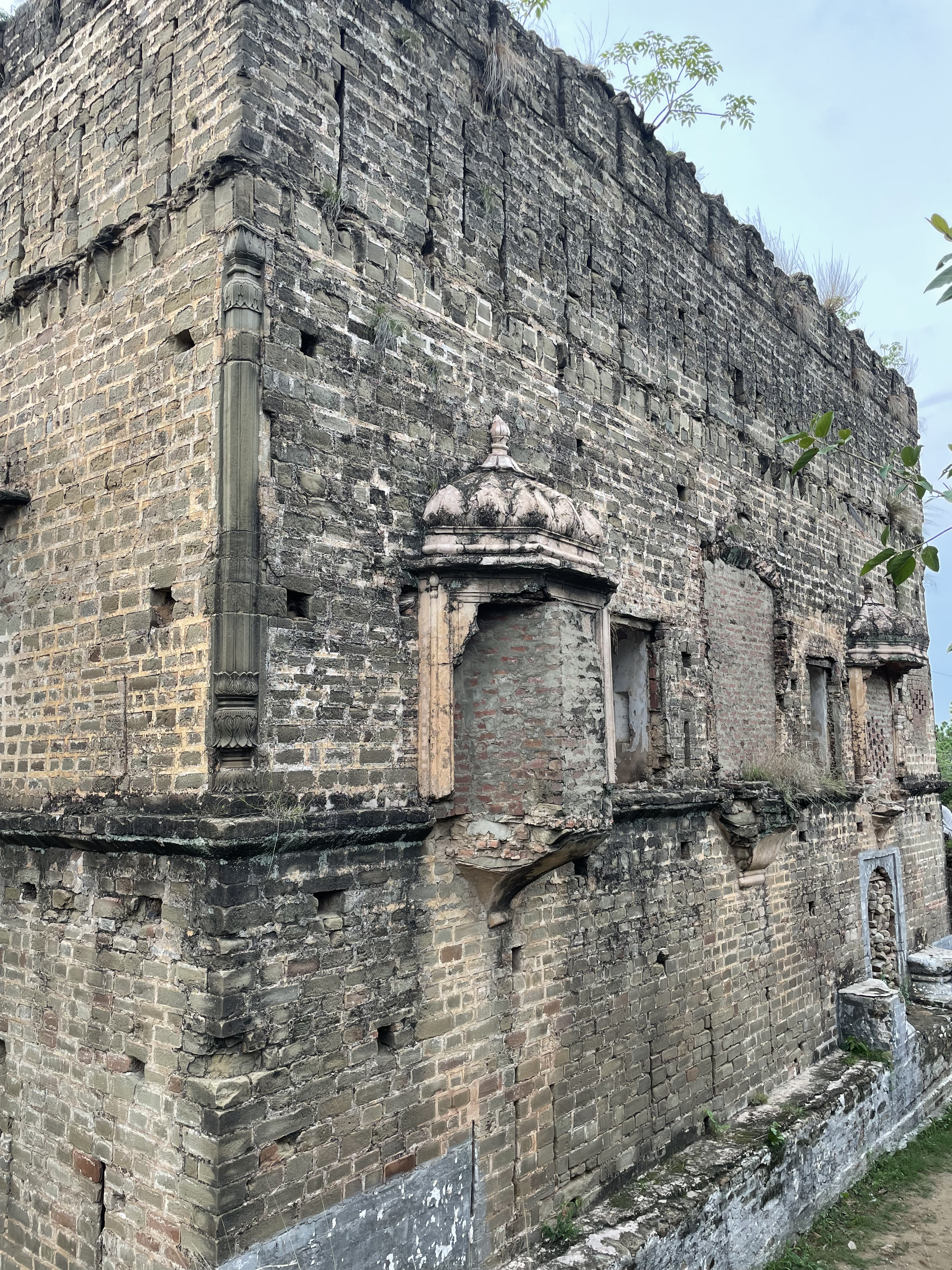
Mosque showing Indo Islamic architecture.

Outer perimeter consists of boundary wall and thirty eight small rooms while inner side of the fort consists of darbar hall, a water pond and forty three rooms. There are three entrances to the fort. Northern main entrance, south eastern entrance and the entrance to inner perimeter. Observation point is prominent on the south eastern corner. There is a firing bay on western wall. Fort is surrounded by embrasures in the walls to allow archers to fire and remain under cover. There is a big room along the southern wall. Here the ruler of the time was used to meet his courtiers and delegates.

== Tomb of Jahangir ==
Mughal emperor Jahangir on his way to Lahore from Kashmir died somewhere in between Chingus Sarai, Rajouri and Sarai Saadabad, Bhimber. To preserve his body his entrails were removed and buried in Baghsar fort. Then body was sent to Lahore where it was buried in mausoleum built along the banks of Ravi.

== Conservation ==
Despite being on line of control, structure of the fort is still intact. But it is severely neglected by government in regard to conservation.

== See also ==
- List of UNESCO World Heritage Sites in Pakistan
- List of forts in Pakistan
- List of museums in Pakistan
