= Koka Kumari Begum =

Wife of Mughal Emperor Jahangir

- Born: Amber, Kingdom of Amber
- Died: 17th century, Agra, Mughal Empire
- Spouse: Jahangir (m.1608, d.1627)
- Dynasty: Kachhwaha (by birth) Timurid (by marriage)
- Father: Yuvraj Jagat Singh of Amer

Koka Kumari Begum was a consort of the fourth Mughal emperor Jahangir.

== Family ==
Koka Kumari Begum belonged to the Kachhwaha clan and was the daughter of Yuvraj Jagat Singh, the eldest son of Raja Man Singh of Amer.

== Marriage ==
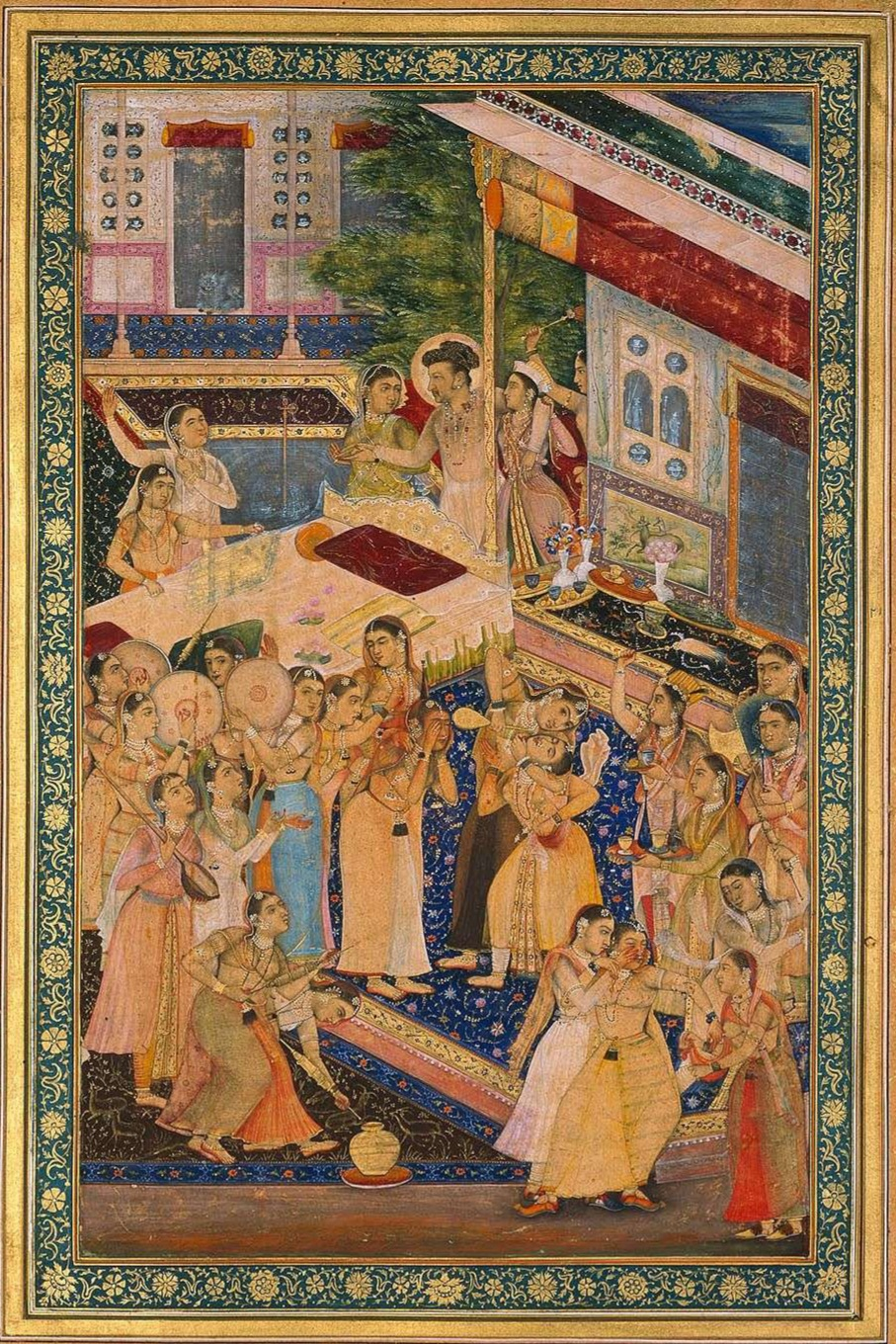
Jahangir celebrating Holi with the ladies of the harem, Koka Kumari Begum probably among them.

Her marriage to Jahangir took place on June 17, 1608. Koka Kumari was a widow before Jahangir had married her. Jahangir had sent Jagat Singh 80,000 rupees as sachaq (wedding present) so that he could marry her. The marriage was a political one intended to suppress the revolt posed by Man Singh, who, along with Mirza Aziz Koka was part of the court faction formed by Prince Khusrau Mirza, and supported him as the next potential emperor instead of Prince Salim. The aftermath of Khusrau's rebellion and his subsequent ploy to murder his father culminated in him being confined in Lahore till 1607, and then ultimately being blinded and imprisoned in Agra. The wedding between Jahangir and the granddaughter of Man Singh was an indication of his goodwill to the Kingdom of Amer and the Kachhwaha clan after the tumultuous rebellion of Khusrau, who was the son of Jahangir's Kachhwaha consort Shah Begum.

The wedding took place at the palace of Mariam-uz-Zamani with great grandeur. Jahangir had personally arranged the wedding and gifted Jagat Singh a rare European tapestry from the bay of Cambay. As part of the dowry, Man Singh had gifted sixty elephants to the Imperial family.
