= Malika Jahan =

Wife of Mughal Emperor Jahangir

- Rajkumari of Jaisalmer
- Spouse: Jahangir (m. 1587; d. 1627)
- House: Bhati (by birth); Timurid (by marriage)
- Father: Rawal Bhim Singh
- Religion: Hinduism

Malika Jahan (Persian: ملکہ جھان; meaning "Queen of the World") was a Jaisalmer princess, and wife of Mughal emperor Jahangir.

== Family ==
Malika Jahan, whose birth name is unknown, was born a princess of Jaisalmer, the daughter of Rawal Bhim Singh, the Bhati ruler of Jaisalmer, a contemporary of Emperor Akbar who served in the imperial administration. He had been a man of rank and influence. She was the granddaughter of Rawal Harraj. She had three paternal uncles named Kalyan Mal, Bhakar and Sultan. Her aunt, Nathi Bai, married Emperor Akbar in 1570, and was a mother of a daughter named Mahi Begum.

Rawal Bhim succeeded his father Harraj in 1578. After Bhim's death in 1616, he left a son named Nathu Singh, two months old, who was killed by the Bhatis. His younger brother Kalyan Mal succeeded him as Rawal.

== Marriage ==
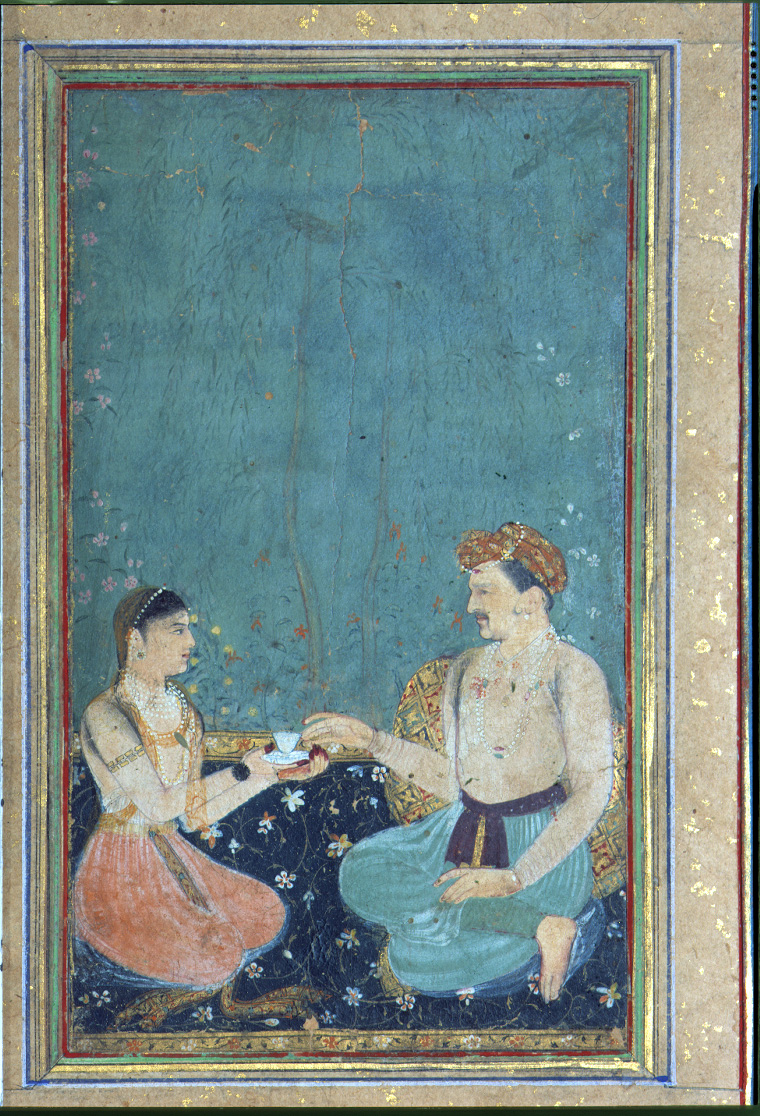
Emperor Jahangir and an unidentified woman.

Jahangir married her while he was a prince, and gave her the title 'Malika Jahan', which literally means ("Queen of the world"). Jahangir notes in his memoirs that this alliance was made because her family had always been faithful to the Mughals.

== In popular culture ==
Malika Jahan is a character in Phiroz H. Madon's historical novel The Third Prince: A Novel (2015).
