= Jahangir =

Mughal emperor from 1605 to 1627

- Padishah; Al-Sultan al-Azam; Shahenshah-e-Hindisthan (King of Kings of India)
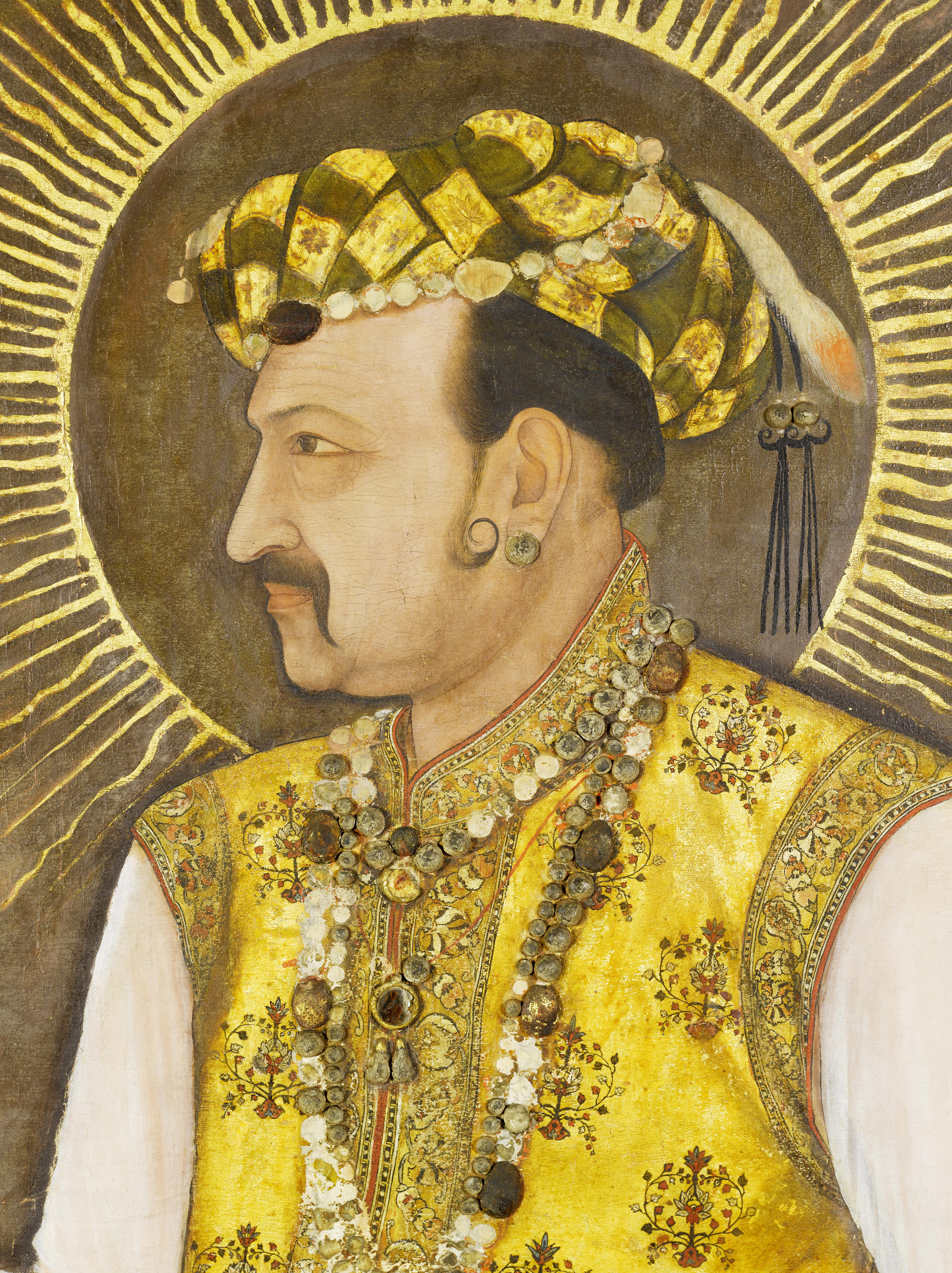
- Portrait by Abu al-Hasan, c. 1617

Mughal emperor
- Reign: 3 November 1605 – 28 October 1627
- Coronation: 24 November 1605; Agra Fort
- Predecessor: Akbar I
- Successor: Shah Jahan; Shahryar Mirza (de facto); Dawar Bakhsh (titular)
- Grand Viziers: See list: Sharif Khan (1605–1611); Mirza Ghiyas Beg (1611–1622); Abu'l-Hasan Asaf Khan (1622–1627)
- Born: Nur ud-din Muhammad Salim; 31 August 1569; Fatehpur Sikri, Agra Sarkar, Agra Subah, Mughal Empire (present-day Uttar Pradesh, India)
- Died: 28 October 1627 (aged 58); Bhimber, Lahore Subah, Mughal Empire (present-day Azad Kashmir, Pakistan)
- Burial: Tomb of Jahangir, (Note: Following his death in Bhimber, his entrails were preserved in a tomb in the Baghsar Fort while his body was sent to Lahore) Lahore, Pakistan
- Spouses: Shah Begum (m. 1585; died 1605); Jagat Gosain (m. 1586; died 1619); Sahib Jamal (m. 1586; died 1599); Malika Jahan (m. 1587); Karamsi Bai (m. 1589); Nur-un-Nissa Begum (m. 1592); Khas Mahal (m. 1596); Saliha Banu Begum (m. 1608; died 1620); Koka Kumari Begum (m. 1608); Nur Jahan (m. 1611)
- Issue more...: Sultan-un-Nissa Begum; Khusrau Mirza; Parviz Mirza; Bahar Banu Begum; Shah Jahan; Luzzat-un-Nissa Begum; Shahryar Mirza
Names
- Nur ud-din Muhammad Salim
Era dates
- 16th and 17th centuries
Regnal name
- Al-Sultan al-'Azam wal Khaqan al-Mukarram, Khushru-i-Giti Panah Abu'l-Fath Nur ud-din Muhammad Jahangir Padshah
Posthumous name
- Jannat Makani (lit. 'Dwelling in Heaven')
- House: Mughal
- Dynasty: Timurid
- Father: Akbar
- Mother: Mariam-uz-Zamani
- Religion: Sunni Islam (Hanafi)
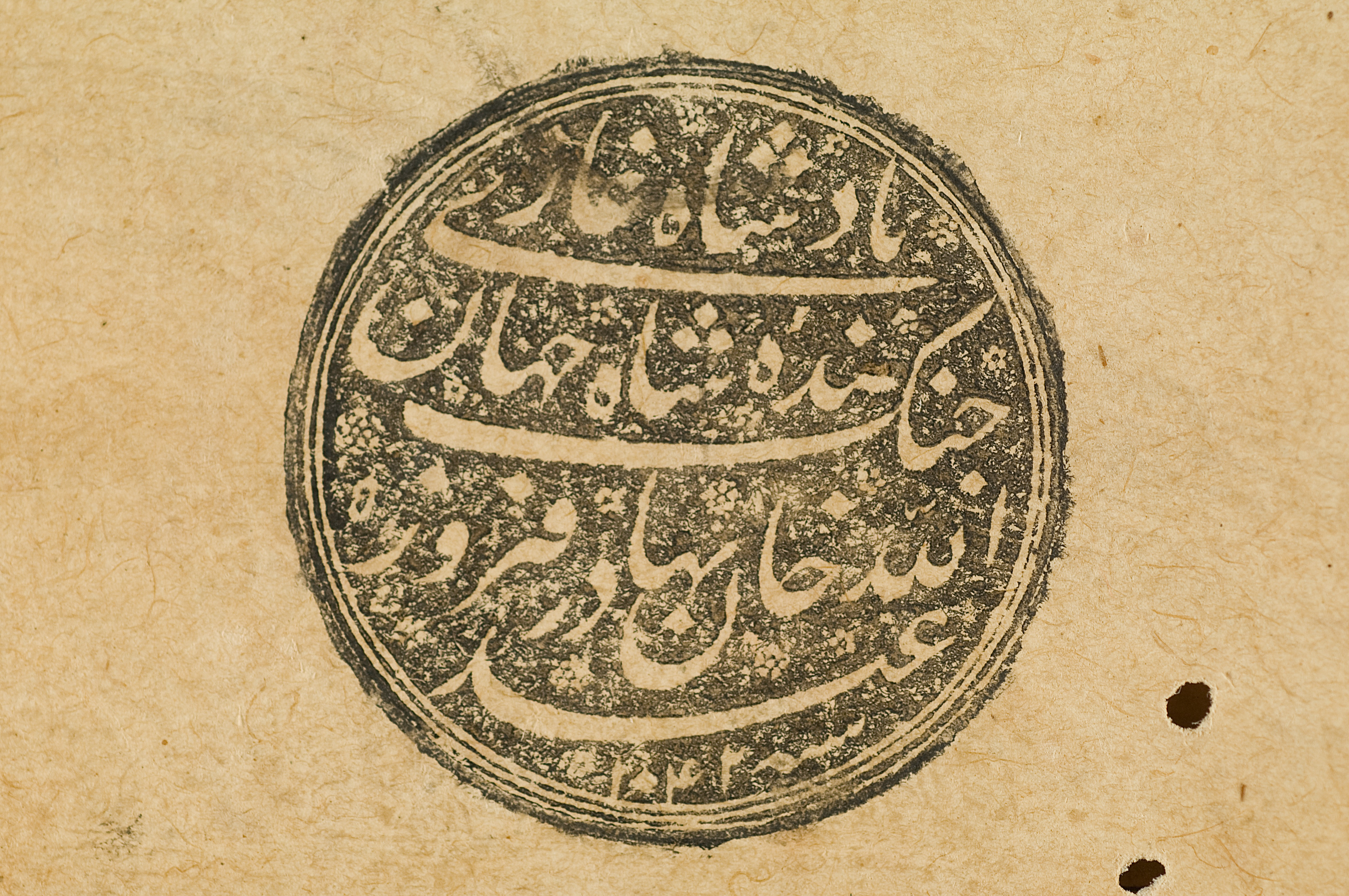
- Imperial Seal

Nur ud-din Muhammad Salim (Note: /ˈnuːrʊˌdɪn/ [mʊ.ɦɑmˈmad̪̚] /sə.liːm/) (Persian: نورالدین محمد سلیم [ˈnuːrʊˌdɪn/ [mʊ.ɦɑmˈmad̪̚] /sə.liːm]; 31 August 1569 – 28 October 1627), known by his royal name Jahangir (Persian: جهانگیر, Persian pronunciation: [d͡ʒa.hɑːn.ˈɡiːɾ]), (Note: Persian pronunciation: [d͡ʒa.hɑːn.ˈɡiːɾ]; lit. 'Conqueror of the World'),) was the fourth Mughal emperor of the Mughal Empire, reigning from 1605 until his death in 1627.

The third and only surviving son of Emperor Akbar I (r. 1556–1605) and his consort Maryam uz-Zamani. Jahangir received a comprehensive education, which included the languages Chagatai, Persian, and Hindustani, as well as diverse subjects such as military tactics and social sciences. In 1594, at the age of 26, Jahangir successfully led an army to crush a revolt by the Bundela in Orchha, and after the surrender of their leader Vir Singh Deo, transformed Orchha into a vassal state. As such, the Jahangir Mahal was later constructed in Orchha by Deo in honor of Jahangir. Following Akbar's death, Jahangir succeeded him on 3 November 1605.

Jahangir's reign was marked by a combination of artistic achievement and political intrigue, set against the backdrop of the Mughal Empire's considerable expansion and consolidation. Jahangir's rule is distinguished by his commitment to justice and his interest in the arts, particularly painting and architecture, which flourished during his reign. Jahangir's reign was characterized by a complex relationship with his nobility and family, notably reflected in his marriage to Mehar-un-Nisa (later known as Empress Nur Jahan), who wielded significant political influence behind the throne. This period saw the empire's further entrenchment into the Indian subcontinent, including efforts to subdue the Rajput Kingdoms and extend Mughal authority into the Deccan. Jahangir's foreign policy included relations with the Safavids of Persia and the Ottoman Empire, as well as with the English East India Company.

Despite his achievements, Jahangir's reign had challenges, including revolts led by his sons, which threatened the stability of his rule. His poor health, caused by a lifetime of opium and alcohol use, led to his death in 1627, precipitating a brief succession crisis before the throne passed to his son, Shah Jahan. Jahangir's legacy lives on through his contributions to Mughal art and architecture, his memoirs, and the policies he implemented, which continued to influence the empire after his demise.

== Early life ==
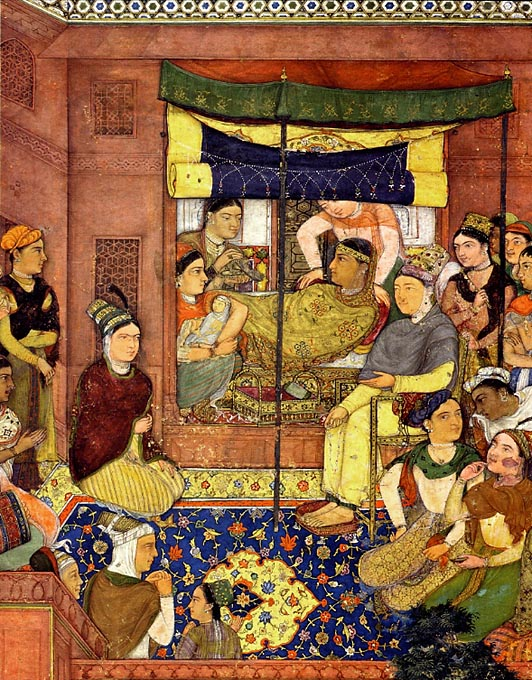
Portrait of Empress Mariam-uz-Zamani, giving birth to prince Salim in Fatehpur Sikri, painted by Bishandas.

Prince Nur al-Din Muhammad Salim was the third son born to Akbar and Mariam-uz-Zamani in the capital city of Fatehpur Sikri on 31 August 1569. He had two full elder twin brothers, Hassan Mirza and Hussain Mirza, born in 1564, both of whom died in infancy. Grief-struck, Akbar and Mariam-uz-Zamani, sought the blessings of Salim Chishti, a reputed khawaja (religious leader) who lived at Fatehpur Sikri. Akbar confided in Salim Chisti, who assured him that he would be soon delivered of three sons who would live up to a ripe old age. His parents, Akbar and Mariam Zamani, in hope of having a son born to them even made a pilgrimage to Ajmer Sharif Dargah, barefoot, to pray for a son.

When Akbar was informed that his chief wife was expecting a child again, an order was passed for the establishment of a royal palace in Fatehpur Sikri (today known as Rang Mahal) near the lodgings of Salim Chishti, where the Empress could enjoy the repose in the vicinity of the saint. Mariam Zamani was shifted to the palace established there and during her pregnancy, Akbar himself used to travel to Sikri and used to spend half of his time in Sikri and another half in Agra.

During the time of Mariam-uz-Zamani's pregnancy with Salim, says Jahangir in his memoirs, the baby stopped kicking in the womb abruptly. When the matter was reported to Akbar, who was engaged in hunt of cheetahs at that time, vowed that if the baby resumes kicking, he would never hunt cheetahs on Fridays throughout his life and Jahangir further notes, that Akbar kept his vow throughout his life. Jahangir, too, in reverence for his father's vow, never hunted cheetahs on Friday. On 31 August 1569, Mariam Zamani gave birth to Salim, and he was named after Hazrat Salim Chishti, in acknowledgement of his father's faith in the efficacy of the holy man's prayer. Akbar, overjoyed with the news of his heir-apparent, ordered a great feast and festivities which were held up to seven days and ordered the release of criminals with great offence. Throughout the empire, largesses were bestowed over common people, and he set himself ready to visit Sikri immediately. However, he was advised by his courtiers to delay his visit to Sikri on account of the astrological belief in Hindustan of a father not seeing the face of his long-awaited son immediately after his birth. He, therefore, delayed his visit and visited Sikri to meet his new born son and wife after forty-one days after his birth. Jahangir's foster mother was the daughter of Salim Chishti, and his foster brother was Qutubuddin Koka, the grandson of Chishti.

Jahangir began his education at the age of five. On this occasion, a big feast was thrown by the Emperor to ceremonially initiate his son into education. His first tutor was Qutubuddin Koka. Many other tutors were appointed to teach Persian, Arabic, Turkish, Hindi, Arithmetic, History, Geography, and Sciences. Abdur Rahim Khan-i-Khanan, one of the versatile geniuses, was an important tutor of him. His maternal uncle, Bhagwant Das the Kachhwaha ruler of Amer, was supposedly one of his tutors on the subject of warfare tactics. During this time, Jahangir grew up fluent in Persian and Hindustani, with a "respectable" knowledge of Persianised courtly Chaghatai ("Turki"), the Mughal ancestral language.

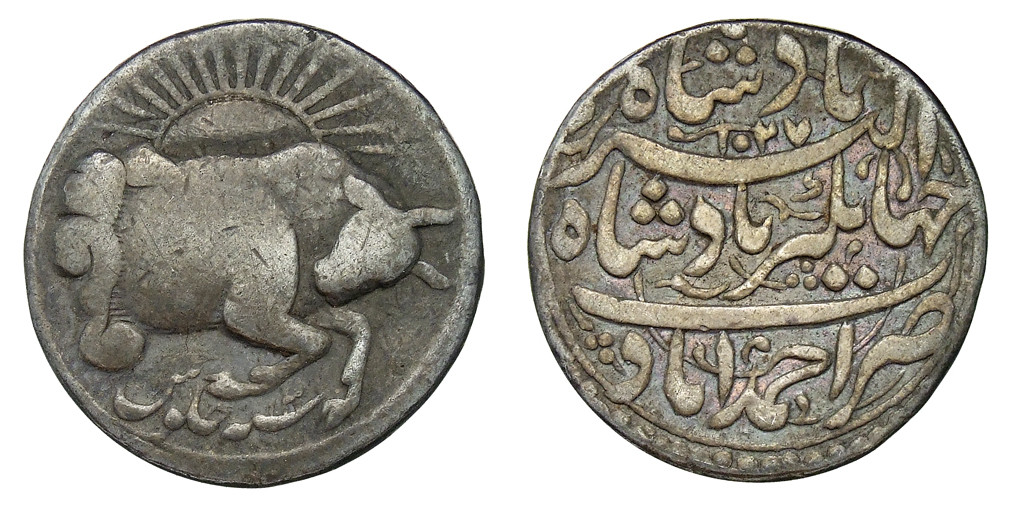
Coin of Jahangir

In 1594, Jahangir was dispatched by his father, Akbar, alongside Asaf Khan also known as Mirza Jafar Beg and Abu'l-Fazl ibn Mubarak to defeat the renegade Raja Vir Singh Deo Bundela and to capture the city of Orchha which was considered the centre of the revolt. Jahangir arrived with a force of 12,000 after many ferocious encounters and finally subdued the Bundela and ordered Vir Singh Deo to surrender. After tremendous casualties and the start of negotiations between the two, Vir Singh Deo handed over 5000 Bundela infantry and 1000 cavalry and submitted to the command of Jahangir along with taking up imperial services at the court later. The victorious Jahangir, at 26 years of age, ordered the completion of the Jahangir Mahal a famous Mughal citadel in Orchha to commemorate and honour his victory. From the very beginning of Jahangir's reign as emperor, he witnessed the internal rivalry of the Bundela chiefs for control. Jahangir appointed his favourite Vir Singh, as the ruler of Orchha by removing his elder brother Raja Ram Shah. This greatly hampered the interest of Ram Shah's house. Thus, Ram Shah along with his family members Bharat Shah, Indrajit, Rao Bhupal, Angad, Prema, and Devi (the wife of the deposed king) raised their arms in rebellion. However, Ram Shah was defeated by his brother Vir Singh with the help of imperial army under Abdullah Khan. Then the deposed Bundela chief escaped and continued to fight the Mughals for two years until he was finally arrested in 1607 and put in prison at Gwalior only later to be given the territory of Chanderi as his patrimony.

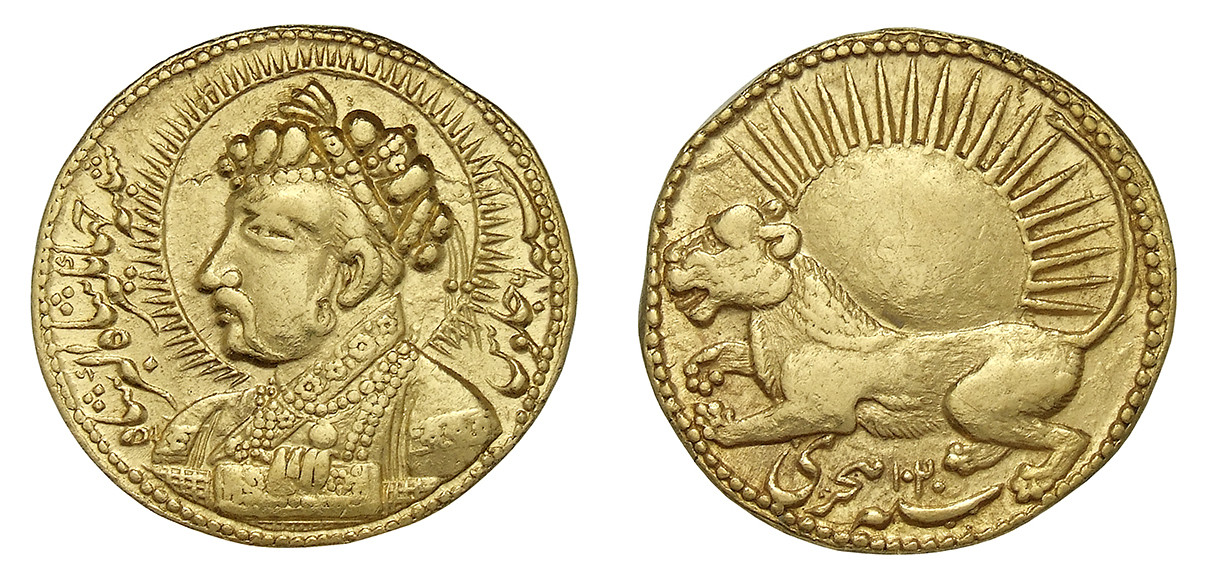
Coin of Jahangir depicting him the Moghul Emperor of Hindustan

=== Rebellion against Akbar ===
In 1599, while Akbar was engaged in his Deccan campaigns, Prince Salim declared himself emperor in Allahabad, assuming the title of “Nur-ud-din Muhammad Jahangir Badshah.” He began issuing coins in his own name and held court separately, effectively challenging Akbar’s sovereignty. Akbar, known for his tolerance and statesmanship, initially sought reconciliation rather than punishment. The rebellion, though serious, ended without a decisive battle. Over time, Salim expressed repentance and was forgiven. By 1604, peace between father and son had been restored, largely through the mediation of influential nobles such as Bir Singh Deo Bundela and Man Singh of Amber.

== Ancestry ==
Jahangir's ancestors

Babur
Humayun
Akbar

Maham Begum
Hamida Banu Begum
Jahangir

Prithviraj Singh I
Raja Bharmal
Mariam-uz-Zamani

Apurva Devi
Rani Champavati Solanki

The ancestral lineage of Jahangir were traced from the House of Babur

Ancestors of Jahangir

8. Babur
4. Humayun
9. Maham Begum
2. Akbar I
10. Shaikh Ali Akbar Jami
5. Hamida Banu Begum
11. Mah Afroz Begum
1. Jahangir
12. Prithviraj Singh I
6. Bharmal
13. Apurva Deiji
3. Mariam-uz-Zamani
14. Rao Ganga Solanki
7. Champa Deiji

== Family ==
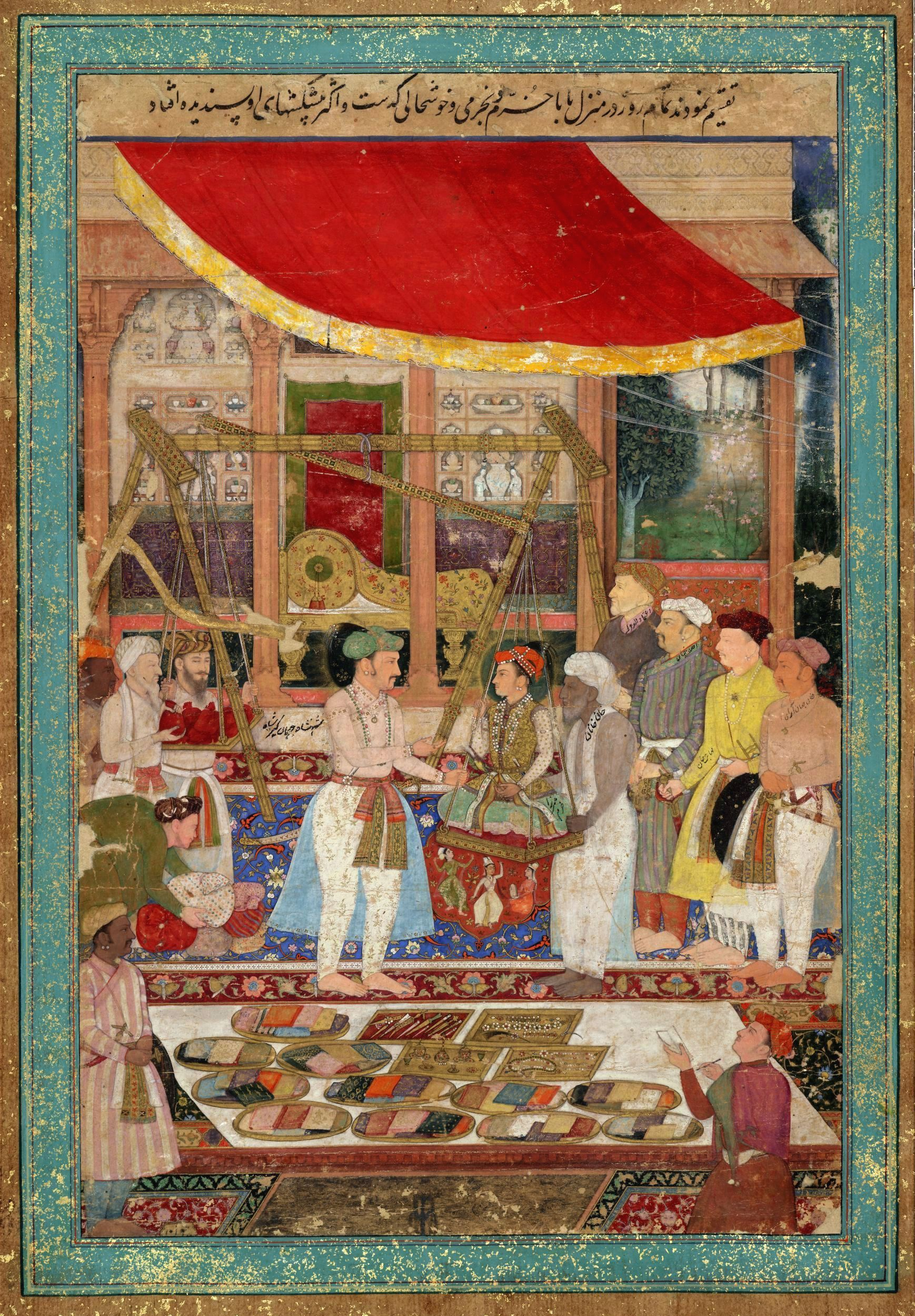
Emperor Jahangir weighing his son Prince Khurram (the future Shah Jahan) on a weighing scale by Manohar c.1615.

=== Consorts ===
Jahangir's first wife was a Kachhwaha Rajput Manbhawat Deiji, the eldest daughter of Raja Bhagwant Das of Amber, who was serving as the imperial governor of Punjab at the time. Their wedding took place on 13 February 1585 and included both Hindu and Muslim ceremonies. The marriage brought significant dowry to Emperor Akbar. She was admired for her beauty, loyalty, and deep affection for Jahangir, which earned her a special place in his heart. After giving birth to their first son, Khusrau, she was honored with the title Shah Begam. She died on 5 May 1605.

His second wife was a Rathore Rajput princess Manawat Deiji also known as Jagat Gosain, daughter of Raja Udai Singh (also known as Mota Raja) of Jodhpur-Marwar. Their marriage took place on 11 January 1586 at Mota Raja's palace. Salim is believed to have fallen for Jagat Gosain during a social gathering attended with his mother. Despite initial hesitation from his parents, the match was approved by Hamida Banu. Her dowry was set at seventy-five lakh tankas. She was the mother of Emperor Shah Jahan. She died on 9 April 1619 and was given the posthumous title of Bilqis Makani.

His third wife was also a Rathore Rajput princess Sujas Deiji from Bikaner, daughter of Raja Rai Singh. They were married on 28 May 1586 in Fatehpur Sikri, with a dowry of 250,000 rupees. Around the same time, he also married the daughter of Gakhar chief, Said Khan Gakhar and granddaughter of Sarang Khan Gakhar as his fourth wife. His fifth wife was Sahib Jamal. She was the daughter of Khawaja Hassan and the cousin of Zain Khan Koka. The marriage took place in 1586. She died on 25 June 1599. Another wife was a Bhati Rajput princess daughter of Rawal Bhim Singh of Jaisalmer, whom Jahangir married in 1587. She was given the title Malika Jahan. Another wife was the daughter of Darya Malbhas.

Another wife was the daughter of Mirza Sanjar, and the granddaughter of Khizr Khan Hazara. They married on 18 October 1589. Another wife was a Rathore Rajput princess Karam Deiji, daughter of Kunwar Keshav Das Rathor of Merta a close kinsman of the house of Marwar. Another wife was the daughter of Abdal Chak and sister of Abiya Chak of the Chak dynasty of Kashmir Sultanate. Another wife was the daughter of Ali Rai, the ruler of Little Tibet. The marriage took place on 1 January 1592. This marriage had a political motive—Tibet's chief offered his daughter to Jahangir to prevent an invasion by Akbar.

Another wife was Nur-un-Nissa Begum. She was the daughter of Ibrahim Hussain Mirza and Gulrukh Begum, the daughter of Kamran Mirza. In spring of 1591, Gulrukh Begum petitioned a request of her daughter's marriage with Jahangir. Akbar agreeded to her request, and this led to their betrothal. The marriage took place on the eve of 26 February 1592 at the house of Hamida Banu Begum. Another wife was the daughter of Mubarak Khan, son of Hussain Chak of Kashmir. The marriage took place on 3 November 1592.

Another wife was the daughter of Raja Ali Khan, ruler of Khandesh. Her father had sent her to be married to Jahangir in 1593. The marriage took place on 10 September 1594. She died on 20 October 1596. Another wife was the daughter of Abdullah Khan Baluch. Another wife was Khas Mahal, the daughter of Zain Khan Koka. The marriage took place on the eve of 18 June 1596 at the house of Hamida Banu Begum. Another wife was the daughter of Khawaja Dost Muhammad Kabuli known as Khawaja Jahan. In 1605, two of his concubines gave birth to two of his sons, Jahandar Mirza and Shahryar Mirza.

Another wife was Saliha Banu Begum. She was the daughter of Qaim Khan. The marriage took place in 1608. She died on 10 June 1620. On 8 June 1608, he married another Kachhwaha Rajput princess ,daughter of Yuvraj Jagat Singh, the eldest deceased son and heir apparent of Mirza Raja Man Singh of Kingdom of Amber. Jahangir personally arranged this marriage, gifting Jagat Singh 80,000 rupees and sending a rare European tapestry from the port of Cambay. The wedding took place at the residence of Mariam Zamani. As part of the dowry, Man Singh gave sixty elephants. On 11 January 1610, he married the daughter of Ram Chandra Ji Dev Bundela of Orchha. At some point, he also married the daughter of Mirza Muhammad Hakim son of Emperor Humayun.

His last wife was Mihr-un-Nissa Begum (better known by her subsequent title of Nur Jahan). The marriage took place on 25 May 1611. She was the widow of a high-ranking Persian nobleman Sher Afgan. Mihr-un-Nissa became his utmost favorite wife after their marriage and was the last of his chief consorts. She was witty, intelligent, and beautiful, which attracted Jahangir to her. Before being awarded the title of Nur Jahan ('Light of the World'), she was called Nur Mahal ('Light of the Palace'). After the death of Saliha Banu Begum in 1620, she was designated the title of Padshah Begum and held it until the death of Jahangir in 1627. Her abilities are said to range from fashion and jewellery designing, perfumery, hunting to building architectural monuments and more.

=== Issue ===
Name	Birth	Death	Notes
By Shah Begum (c. 1570 – 5 May 1605)
Sultan-un-Nissa Begum	25 April 1586	5 September 1646	First child of Jahangir. Remained unmarried.
Khusrau Mirza	16 August 1587	26 January 1622	rebelled against Jahangir and was blinded and later killed on the orders of Shah Jahan.
By Jagat Gosain (13 May 1573 – 8 April 1619)
Begum Sultan Begum	9 October 1590	September 1591	born on the same day as her half-sister, Bahar Banu.
Shah Jahan	5 January 1592	22 January 1666	succeeded Jahangir as the fifth Mughal Emperor.
Luzzat-un-Nissa Begum	23 September 1597	1603	Youngest daughter of Jahangir.
By the daughter of Said Khan Gakhar
Iffat Banu Begum	6 April 1589	Infancy	
By Sahib Jamal (unknown – 25 June 1599)
Parviz Mirza	31 October 1589	28 October 1626	married and had issues including, Nadira Banu Begum.
A daughter	21 January 1591	infancy	
A daughter	14 October 1594	infancy	
By the daughter of Raja Darya Malbhas
Daulat-un-Nissa Begum	24 December 1589	infancy	
By Karamsi
Bahar Banu Begum	9 October 1590	8 September 1653	Favourite daughter. Born on the same day as her half-sister, Begum Sultan.
By the daughter of Abdal Chak and sister of Abiya Chak
A daughter	12 April 1592	infancy	
By Nur-un-Nissa Begum (c. 1570 – unknown)
A daughter	28 August 1595	infancy	
By the daughter of Abdullah Khan Baluch
A daughter	January 1595	infancy	
By concubines (various)
Jahandar Mirza	circa 1605	unknown	
Shahryar Mirza	circa 1605	23 January 1628	Youngest child of Jahangir.

== Reign ==
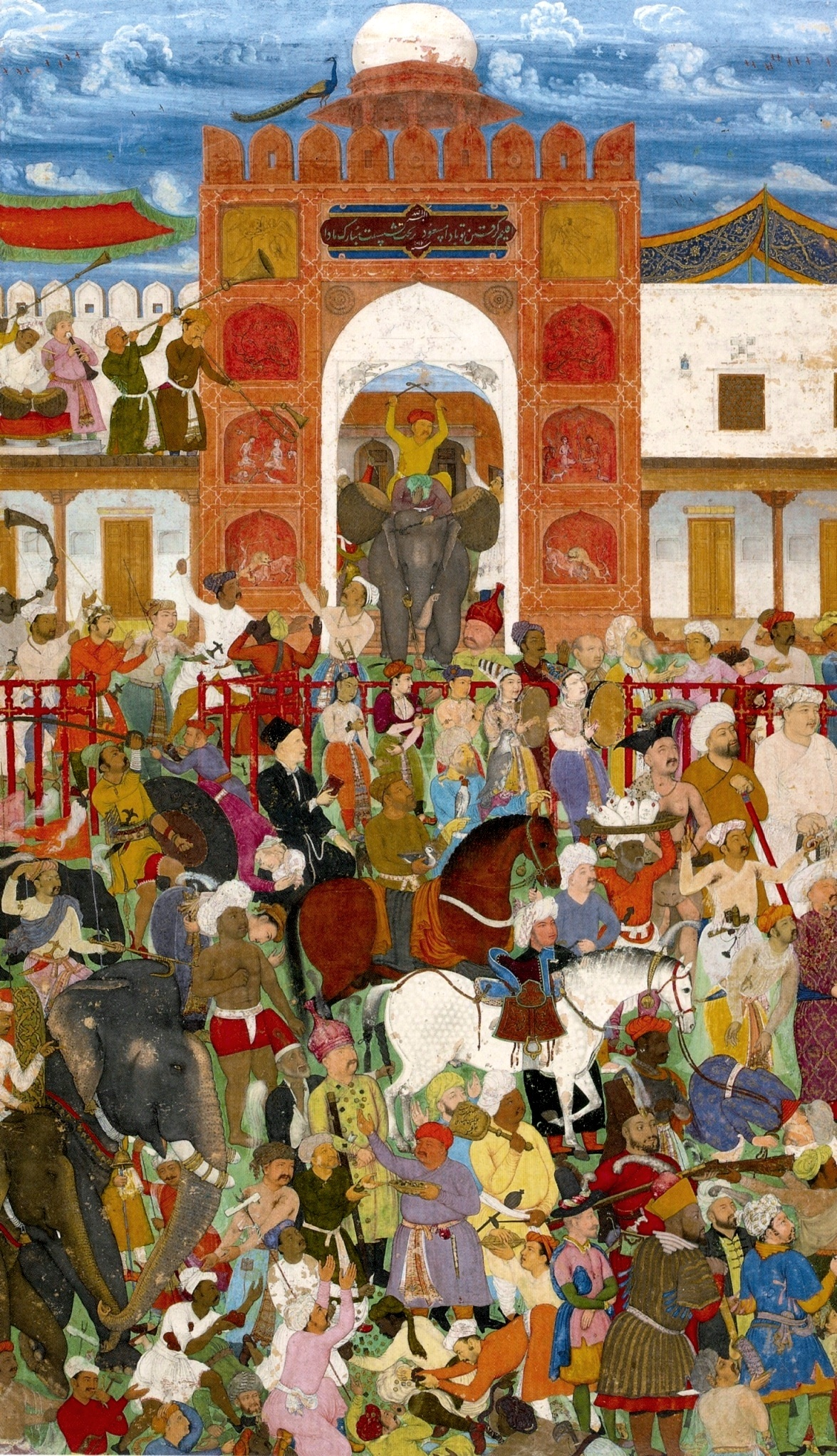
Celebrations at the accession of Jahangir in 1600, when Akbar was away from the capital on an expedition, Salim organised a coup and declared himself emperor. Akbar had to hastily return to Agra and restore order.

According to Jesuit missionary Pierre de Jarric, the orthodox scholar Ahmad Sirhindi sent letters to his disciple, Shaikh Farid Bukhari, a Mir Bakshi official who had been appointed as representative of the muslim orthodox faction of Mughal court, to support Jahangir to succeed his father. The orthodox faction extracted promise from Jahangir that he would support the cause of orthodox faction's cause if he succeeded. Jahangir succeeded the throne on Thursday, 3 November 1605, eight days after his father's death.

=== Khusrau rebellion ===
After Jahangir's ascent to the Mughal throne, growing tensions would cause Khusrau to rebel in April 1606. Soon after, Jahangir had to fend off his son Khusrau Mirza when he attempted to claim the throne based on Akbar's will. He left Agra with 350 horsemen on 6 April 1606 under the pretext of visiting Akbar's tomb in nearby Sikandra. Khusrau laid siege on Lahore, defended by Dilawar Khan. Jahangir relieved the siege and defeated Khusrau at the battle of Bhairowal. He was captured by Jahangir's army while crossing the Chenab river, attempting to flee toward Kabul. Khusrau was then defeated with the support of the Barha and Bukhari sāda and confined in the fort of Agra.

Jahangir was found to be more militarily capable, and he crushed the rebellion within a week. Jahangir had all the young aristocrat supporters of Khusrau tortured, impaled and made him watch them in agony as a warning. After rebelling and being defeated again for the second time, Khusrau was then blinded and imprisoned until 1619. In 1620, Khusrau was sent on a mission to Deccan with his brother, Shah Jahan.

=== Rule ===
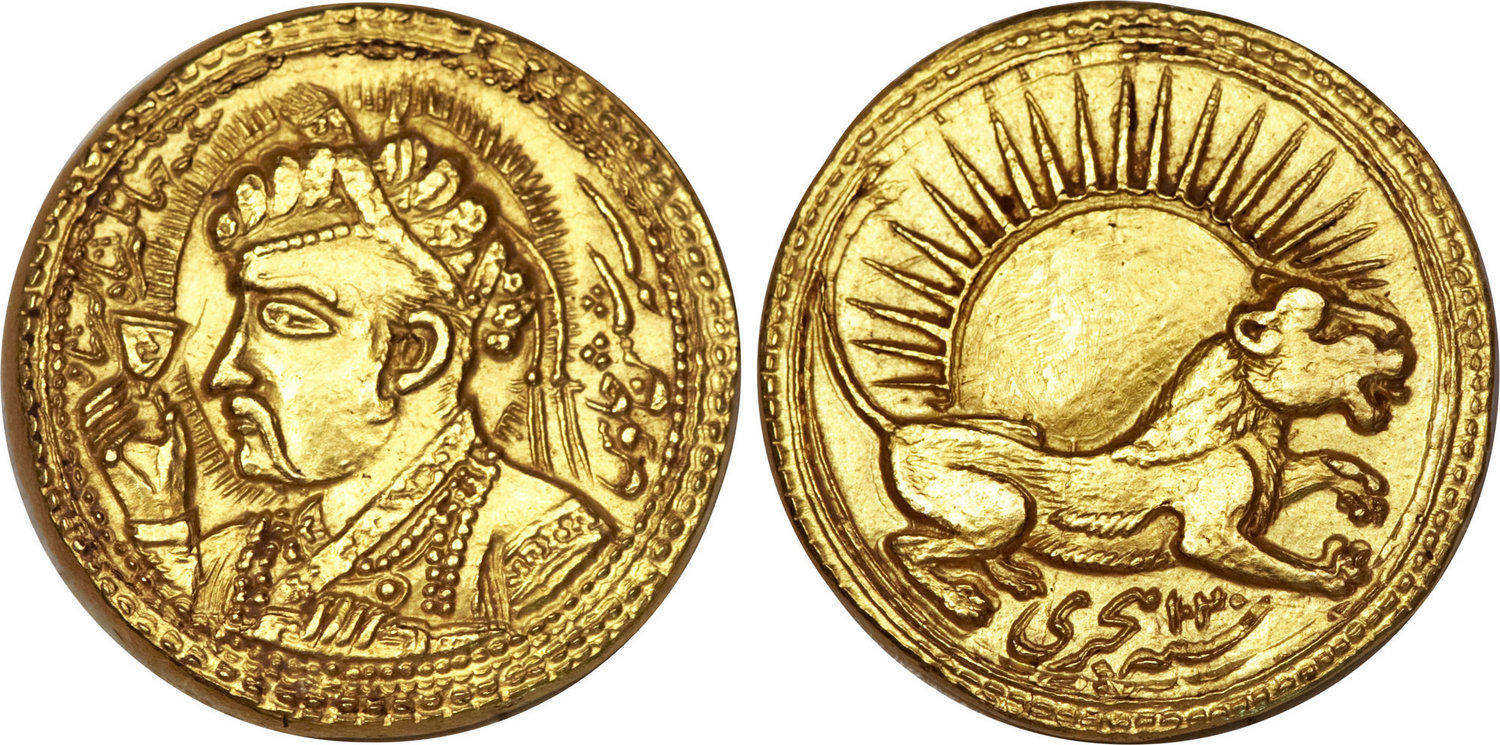
Commemorative coin of Jahangir for the 6th year of rule, with Lion and Sun symbol and legends in Persian. 1611

From the time of his marriage with Mehr-un-Nissa, later known as Empress Nur Jahan, Jahangir left the reins of government in her hands and appointed her family and relatives to high positions. Nur Jahan had complete freedom of speech near Jahangir without any reprimand. On the contrary, she could nag and fight with him on the smallest issue. Thus, her unprecedented freedom of action to control the state caused the displeasure of both his courtiers and foreigners.

In 1608, Jahangir posted Islam Khan I to subdue the rebel Musa Khan, the Masnad-e-Ala of the Baro-Bhuyan confederacy in Bengal, who was able to imprison him.

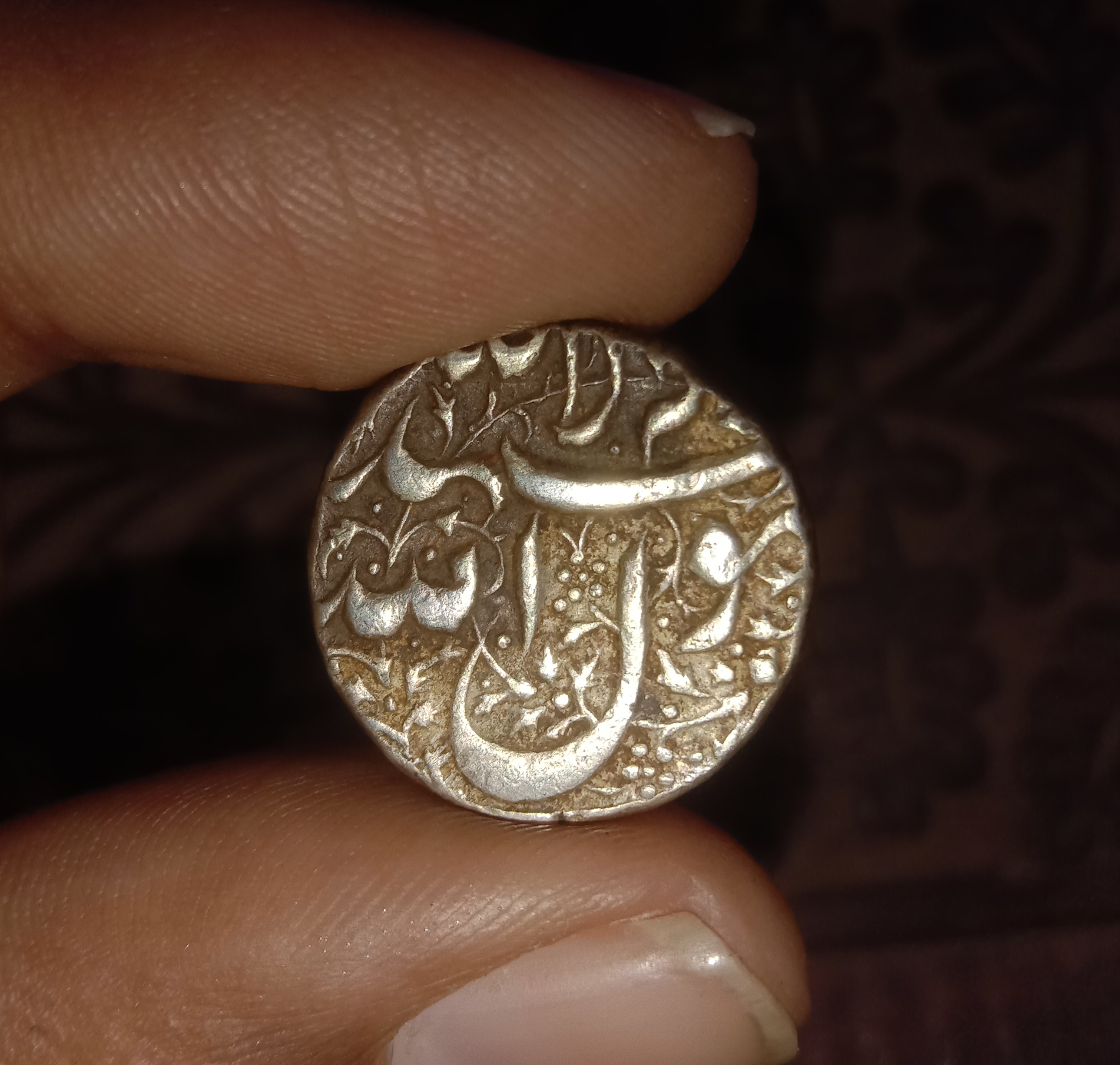
Silver rupee of Jahangir, Ahmednagar Mint.

In 1613, Jahangir issued a sanguinary order for the extirpation of the race of the Kolis who were notorious robbers and plunderers living in the most inaccessible parts of the province of Gujarat. A large number of the Koli chiefs were slaughtered and the rest hunted to their mountains and deserts. 169 heads of such Koli chiefs killed in battle by Nur-ul-llah Ibrahim, commander of 'Bollodo'. In the same year later, the Portuguese seized the Mughal ship Rahimi, which had set out from Surat on its way with a large cargo of 100,000 rupees and Pilgrims, who were on their way to Mecca and Medina to attend the annual Hajj. The Rahimi was owned by Mariam-uz-Zamani, mother of Jahangir and Akbar's favourite consort. She was bestowed the title of 'Mallika-e-Hindustan' (Queen of Hindustan) by Akbar and was subsequently referred to as same during Jahangir's reign. The Rahimi was the largest Indian ship sailing in the Red Sea and was known to the Europeans as the "great pilgrimage ship". When the Portuguese officially refused to return the ship and the passengers, the outcry at the Mughal court was unusually severe. The outrage was compounded by the fact that the owner and the patron of the ship was none other than the revered mother of the current emperor. Jahangir himself was outraged and ordered the seizure of the Portuguese town Daman. He ordered the apprehension of all Portuguese within the Mughal Empire; he further confiscated churches that belonged to the Jesuits. This episode is considered to be an example of the struggle for wealth that would later ensue and lead to colonisation of the Indian sub-continent. Jahangir then gathered his forces under the command of Ali Kuli Khan and fought Raja Lakshmi Narayan Bhup of the Kingdom of Koch Bihar in the far eastern province of Bengal. Raja Lakshmi Narayan then accepted the Mughals as his suzerains and was given the title Nazir, later establishing a garrison at Atharokotha. Jahangir was responsible for ending a century-long struggle with the Sisodia Rajput house of Mewar. The campaign against them was pushed so extensively that they were made to submit with great loss of life and property.

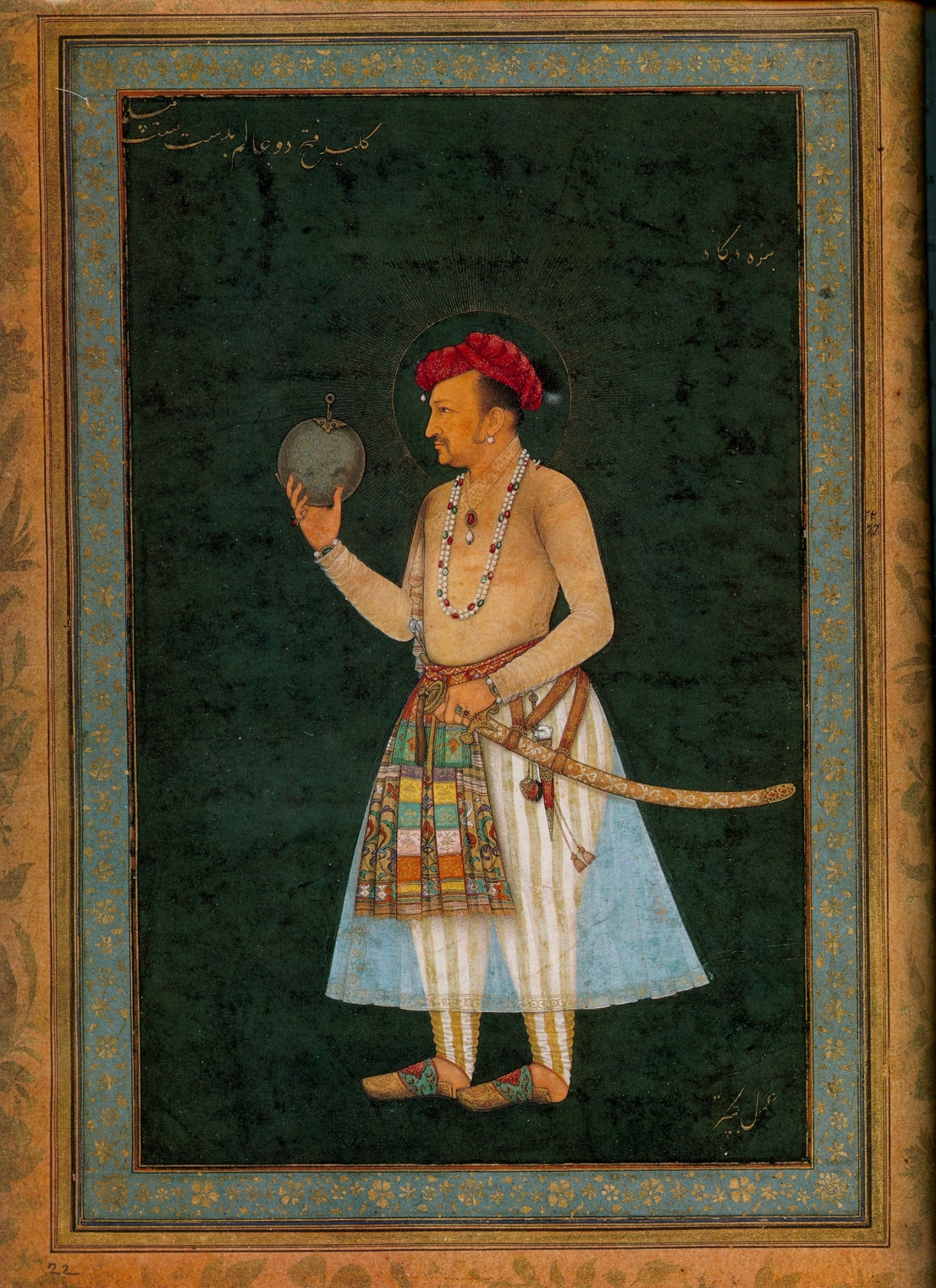
Jahangir holding a globe, 1614–1618.

In 1614, The East India Company persuaded King James I to send a British ambassador to the Mughal court, Thomas Roe. Thomas Roe describes how petitioners could use the chain of justice to attract the emperor's attention if his decision was not to their satisfaction during Darshana. The Darshana tradition was adopted by the Mughal Emperors from Hindu religio-political rituals. As a royal envoy to the Agra court of Jahangir. Roe resided at Agra for three years, until 1619. At the Mughal court, Roe allegedly became a favourite of Jahangir and may have been his drinking partner; he arrived with gifts of "many crates of red wine" and explained to him what beer was and how it was made. The immediate result of the mission was to obtain permission and protection for an East India Company factory at Surat. While no major trading privileges were conceded by Jahangir, "Roe's mission was the beginning of a Mughal-Company relationship that would develop into something approaching a partnership and see the "EIC" gradually drawn into the Mughal nexus". While Roe's detailed journals are a valuable source of information on Jahangir's reign, the Emperor did not return the favour, with no mention of Roe in his voluminous diaries.

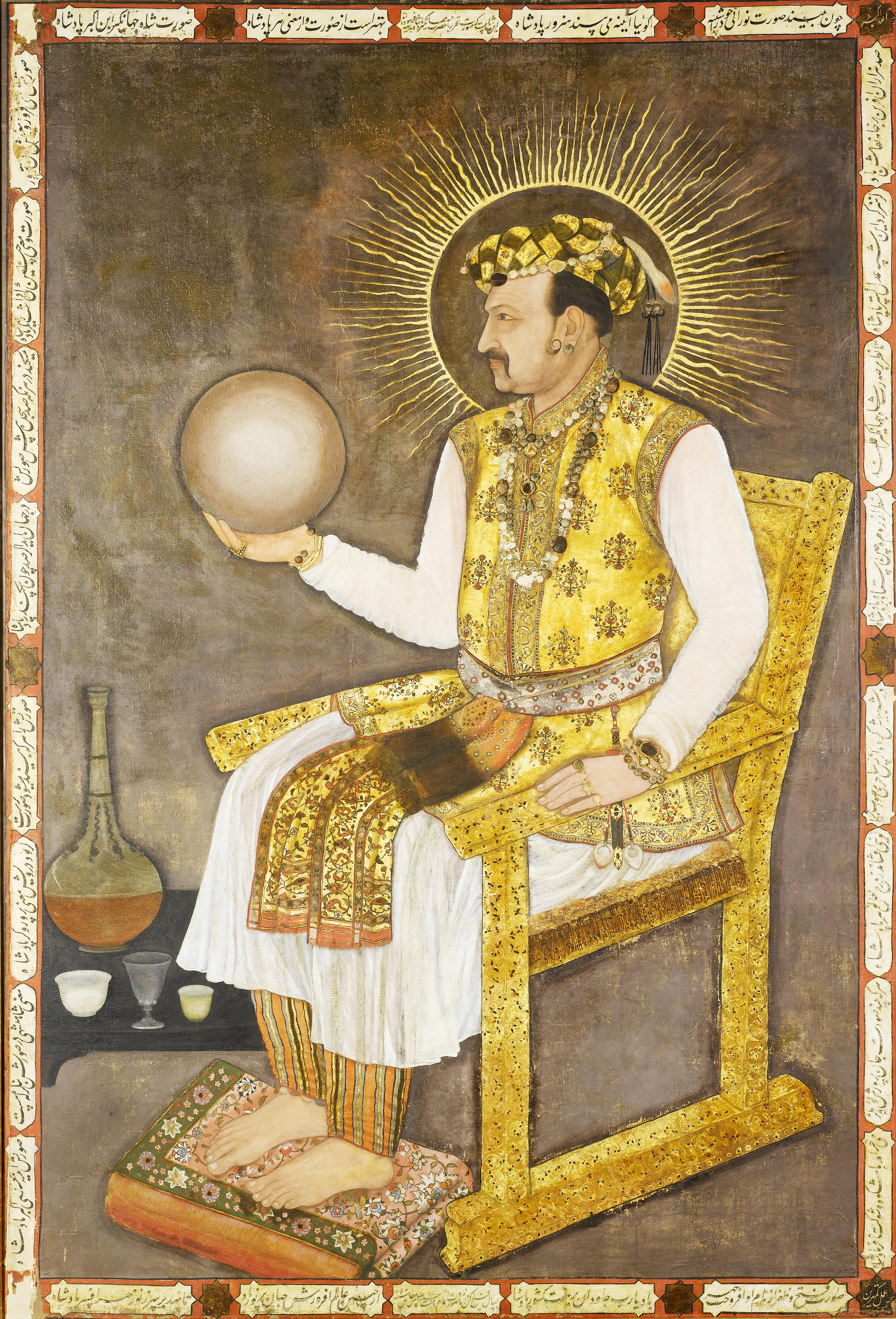
Jahangir by Abu al-Hasan c.1617

In 1615, Jahangir captured Kangra Fort, whose Katoch rulers came under Mughal vassalship during the reign of Akbar. Consequently, a siege was laid and the fort was taken in 1620, which "resulted in the submission of the Raja of Chamba who was the greatest of all the rajas in the region." The district of Kishtwar, in the vast province of Kashmir, was also conquered the same year.

In October 1616, Jahangir sent Prince Khurram to fight against the combined forces of three rebel kingdoms of Ahmednagar, Bijapur and Golconda. Jahangir considered his third son, Khurram (regnal name Shah Jahan) as his favourite son.

After intense lobbying by VOC factors during Jahangir's visit to Ahmedabad, Jahangir issued the first known Firman directed towards the VOC in Gujarat, contained in a letter from P. G. van Ravesteyn and A. W. Goeree to Jan Pieterszoon Coen, dated 12 March 1618. The firman granted few notable assurances to the factors, such as freedom to trade at any Mughal ports, autonomy to govern their affairs, application of normal customs duty (believed to be 2.5% during Jahangir's reign), freedom to trade with local merchants and profess their religion.

In 1621 of February, However, when Nur Jahan married her daughter, Mihr-un-nissa Begum, to Jahangir's youngest son, Shahryar Mirza, Khurram suspected that his stepmother was trying to maneuver Shahryar as the successor to Jahangir. Using the rugged terrain of Deccan to his advantage, Khurram launched a rebellion against Jahangir in 1622. This precipitated a political crisis in Jahangir's court. Khurram murdered his blind older brother, Khusrau Mirza, to smooth his path to the throne. Simultaneously, the Safavid emperor Abbas the Great attacked Kandahar in the winter of 1622. Since it was both a commercial center at the border of the Mughal Empire and the burial place of Babur, the founder of the Mughal Empire, Jahangir dispatched Prince Shahryar to repel the Safavids. However, due to Shahryar's inexperience and harsh Afghan winter, Kandahar fell to the Safavids.

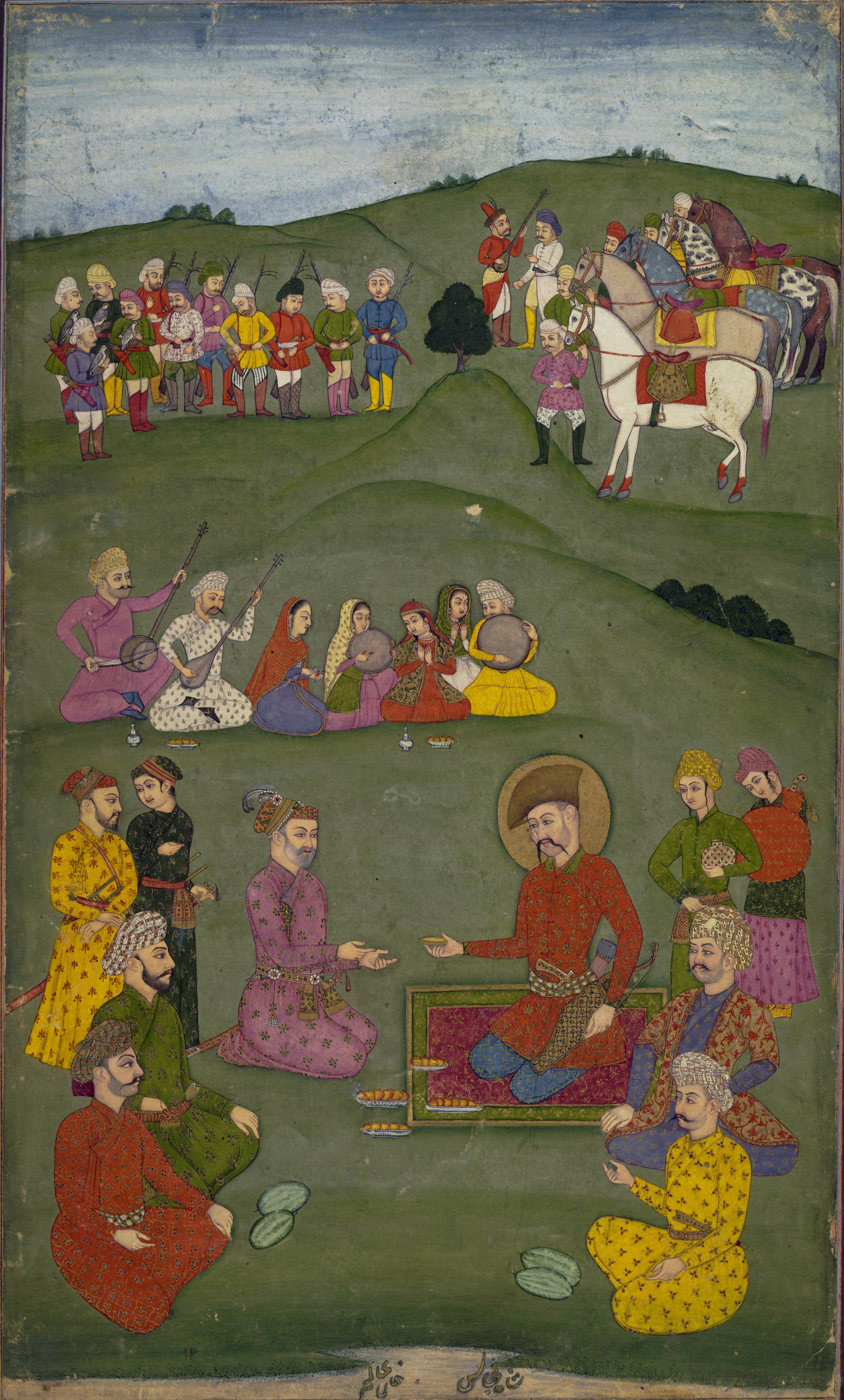
Shah Abbas I receiving Khan Alam, ambassador from Jahangir in 1617

In 1623, Emperor Jahangir sent his tehsildar, Khan Alam, to Safavid Persia, accompanied by 800 sepoys, scribes and scholars, along with ten howdahs well decorated in gold and silver, to negotiate peace with Emperor Abbas after a brief conflict in the region around Kandahar. Khan Alam soon returned with valuable gifts and groups of masters of the hunt (Persian: میر شکار, romanized: mir shikār) from both Safavid Iran and the Khanates of Central Asia. On March, Jahangir ordered Mahabat Khan, one of Jahangir's most loyal high generals, to crush Khurram's rebellion in the Deccan. After a series of victories by Mahabat Khan over Khurram, the civil war finally ended in October 1625.

In 1626, Jahangir began to contemplate an alliance between the Ottoman Empire, the Mughals, and the Khanate of Bukhara of the Uzbeks against the Safavids, who had defeated the Mughals at Kandahar. He even wrote a letter to the Ottoman Sultan, Murad IV. Jahangir's ambition did not materialise due to his death in 1627.

== Death ==
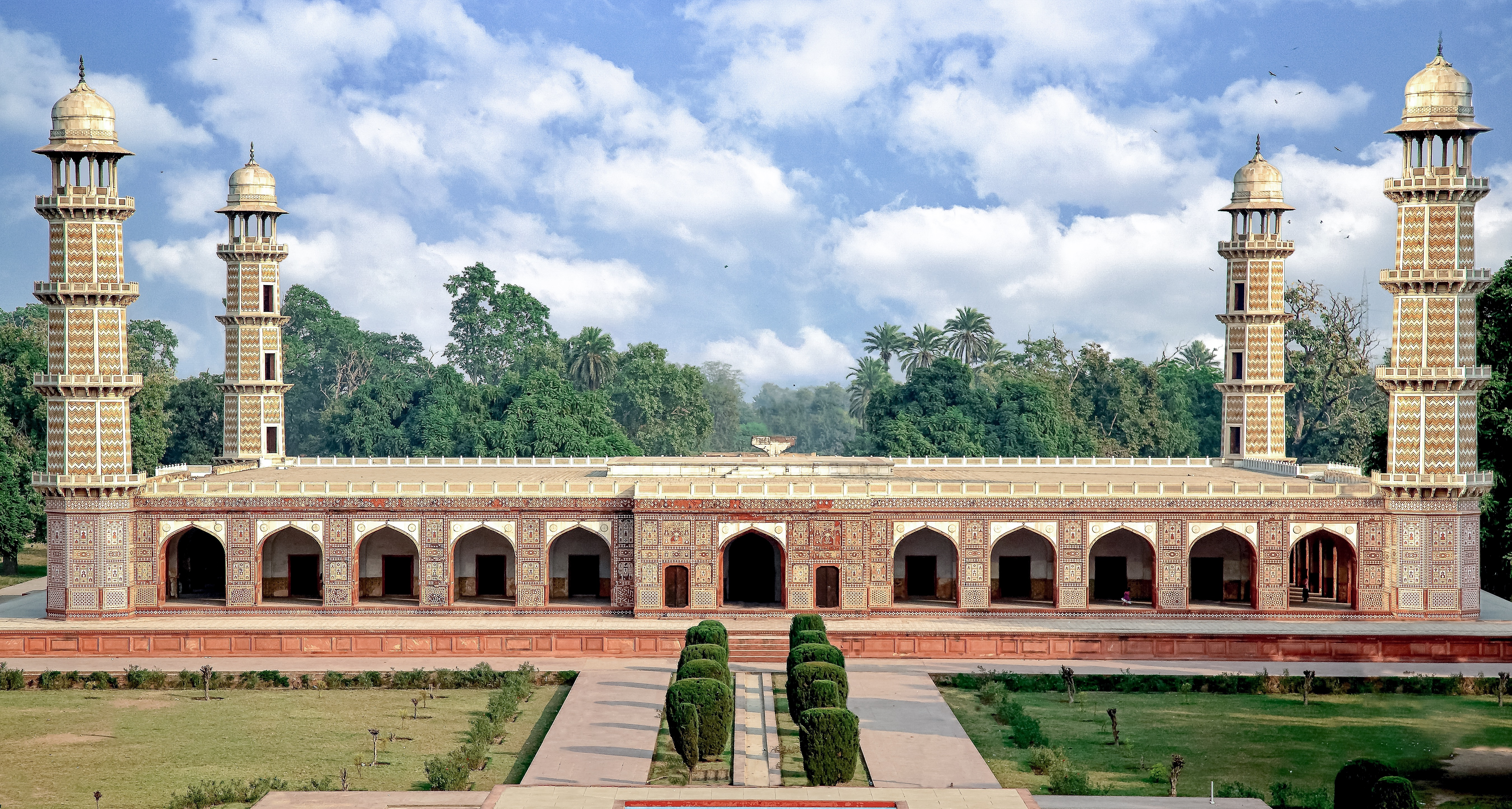
Tomb of Jahangir in Lahore

A lifelong user of opium and wine, Jahangir was frequently ill in the 1620s. Jahangir was trying to restore his health by visiting Kashmir and Kabul. He went from Kabul to Kashmir but decided to return to Lahore because of a severe cold.

In 1627 on 29 October, during the journey from Kashmir to Lahore, Jahangir died near Bhimber. To embalm and preserve his body, the entrails were removed; these were buried inside Baghsar Fort near Bhimber in Subah of Lahore. The body was then conveyed by palanquin to Lahore and was buried in Shahdara Bagh, a suburb of that city. His son, Shah Jahan, commissioned his tomb and is today a popular tourist attraction site. The tomb site was inscribed on the tentative list for UNESCO World Heritage Site status in 1993.

Jahangir's death launched a minor succession crisis. While Nur Jahan desired her son-in-law, Shahryar Mirza, to take the throne, her brother Abu'l-Hassan Asaf Khan was corresponding with his son-in-law, Prince Khurram to take over the throne. To counter Nur Jahan, Abu'l Hassan put Dawar Bakhsh as the puppet ruler and confined Nur Jahan in the Shahdara. Upon his arrival in Agra in February 1628, Prince Khurram executed both Shahryar and Dawar and took the regnal name Shah Jahan (Shihab-ud-Din Muhammad Khurram).

== Personal life ==
Jahangir was famous for his "Chain of Justice". In contemporary paintings, it has been shown as a golden chain with golden bells. In his memoir Tuzk-e-Jahangiri, he wrote that he ordered the creation of this chain for his subjects to appeal to the emperor if they were denied justice at any level.

Jahangir also took interest in public health and medicine. After his accession, he passed twelve orders, of which at least two were related to this area. The fifth order forbade the manufacturing and sale of rice spirit and any kind of intoxicating drugs, and the tenth order was instrumental in laying the foundation of free hospitals and appointment of physicians in all the cities of his empire.

Jahangir was known for his fondness in hunting Nilgai.

=== Religious view ===
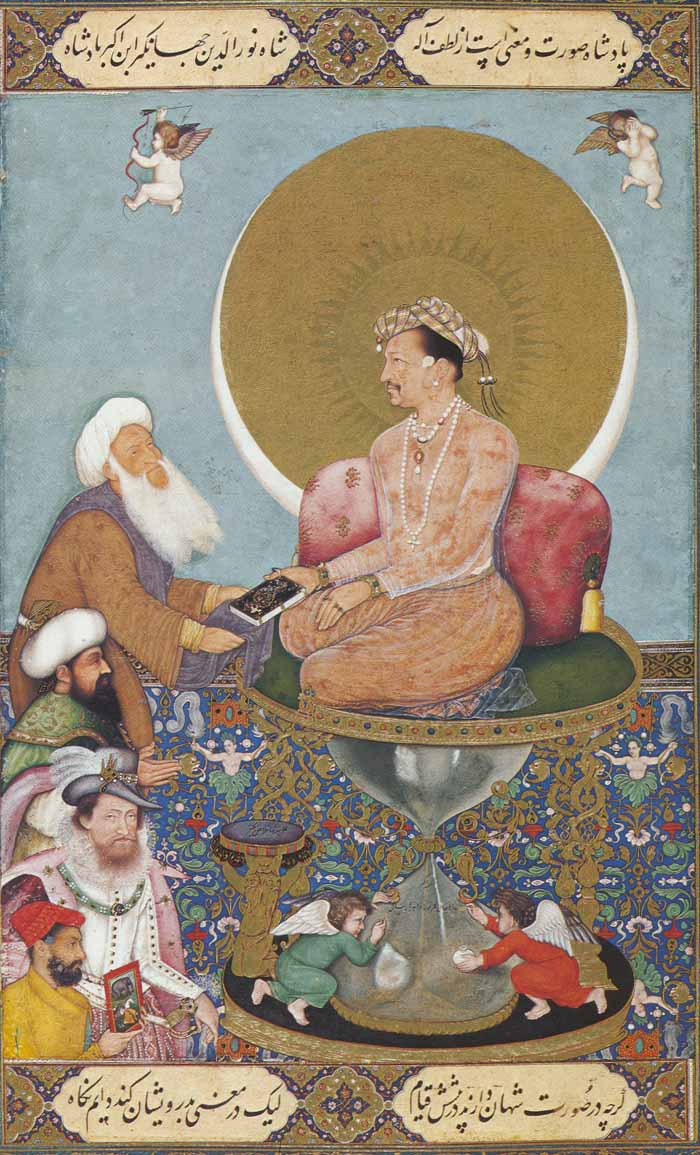
A Mughal miniature by Bichitr dated from the early 1620s depicting the Mughal emperor Jahangir preferring an audience with Sufi saint to his contemporaries, the Ottoman Sultan Ahmed I and the King of England James I (d. 1625); the picture is inscribed in Persian: "Though outwardly shahs stand before him, he fixes his gazes on dervishes."

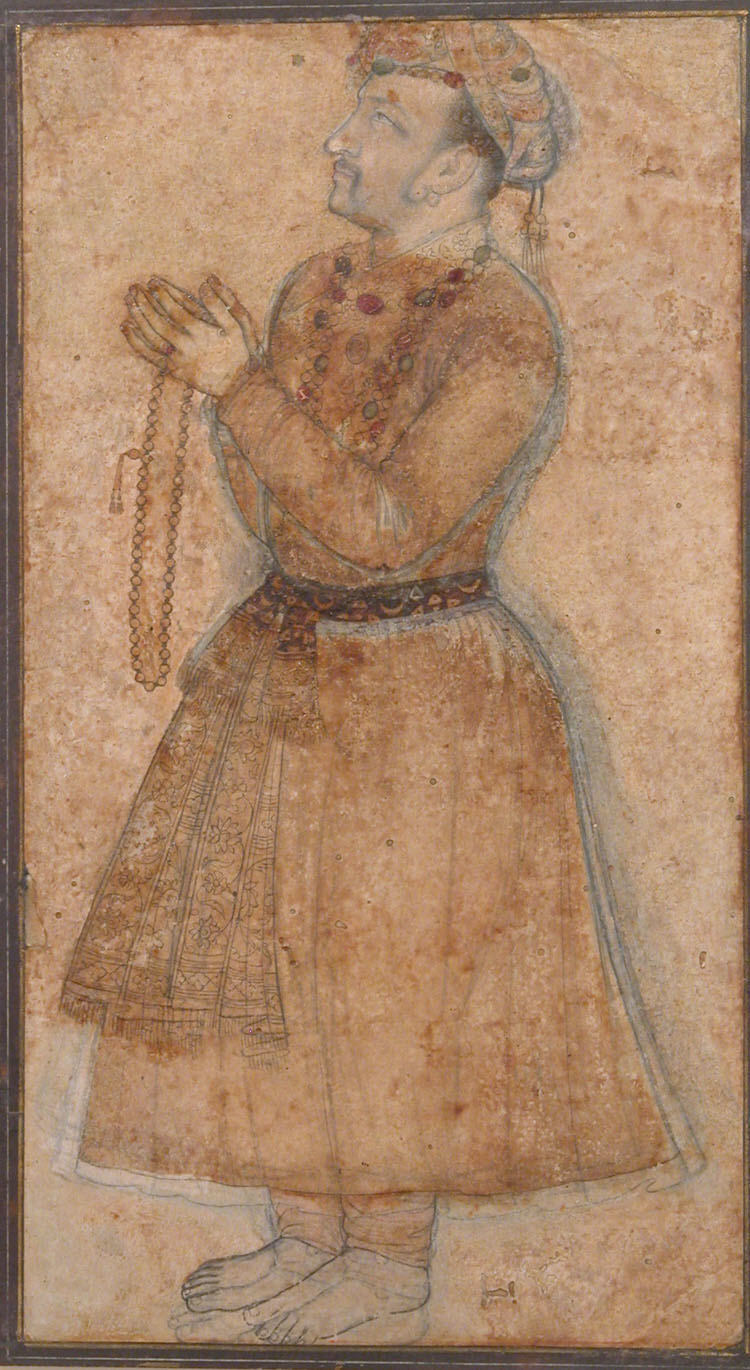
Portrait of Mughal Emperor Jahangir making Dua

According to M. Athar Ali, Jahangir generally continued the religious policy of Akbar and had a major interest in pantheism. However, orthodox figures in the Mughal's court influenced him in his later years to become more puritan in stance and reversed some of Akbar's religious policy.

At the start of his regime, many staunch Sunnis were hopeful, because he seemed less tolerant of other faiths than his father had been. At the time of his accession and the elimination of Abu'l Fazl, his father's chief minister and the architect of his eclectic religious stance, a powerful group of orthodox noblemen had gained increased power in the Mughal court. This included nobles especially like Shaykh Farid, Jahangir's trusted Mir Bakhshi, who held firmly the citadel of orthodoxy in Muslim India. Another influence for Jahangir changed his religious policies was due to the action of Ahmad Sirhindi, who routinely attend the court debates to counteract some religious beliefs and doctrines which prevalent in the court. In the process, it is recorded from these correspondence which compiled in 1617, that Farid Murtaza Khan took Ahmad Sirhindi advice regarding this matter. His efforts influenced Abul Fazl, protegee of emperor Akbar, to support Ahmad Sirhindi in effort to convince Jahangir to reverse the policies of Akbar of tolerating Hindus in Mughal court. Yohanan Friedmann has noted that according to many modern historians and thinkers, the puritanical thought of Ahmad Sirhindi has inspired the religious orthodoxy of emperor Aurangzeb. This was noted by how Ahmad Sirhindi managed to influence the successor of emperor Akbar, starting from Jahangir, into reversing Akbar's policies such as lifting marriage age limits, mosque abolishments, and Hijra methodology revival which was abandoned by his father. It is noted by historians that this influence has been significantly recorded during the conquest of Kangra under Jahangir, that at the presence of Ahmad Sirhindi who observed the campaign, the Mughal forces had the Idols broken, a cow slaughtered, Khutbah sermon read, and other Islamic rituals performed. Further mark of Jahangir's departure from Akbar's secular policy were recorded Terry, a traveller, who came and observed India region between 1616 and 1619, where he found the mosques full of worshippers, the exaltation of Quran and hadith practical teaching, and the complete observance of Fasting during Ramadan and Eid al-Fitr celebrations.

Jahangir issued bans on cowslaughter and animal slaughter on certain days of the week in continuance of his father's policy. According to the Dabistan-i Mazahib he appointed Srikant of Kashmir to be qazi of the Hindus so that they would have their own judicial representative. He also continued his father's policy of patronizing Brahmins and temples. Notably he issued several grants to the Chaitanya sect for their temples in Vrindavan, but also made negative comments about their temples. He, like his father, disapproved of reincarnation and idol worship and ordered the boar image to be removed from Rana Shankar's temple at Pushkar.

Most notorious was the execution of the Sikh Guru Arjan Dev on Jahangir's orders. His lands were confiscated and his sons imprisoned as Jahangir suspected him of helping Khusrau's rebellion. It is unclear whether Jahangir even understood what a Sikh was, referring to Guru Arjan as a Hindu, who had "captured many of the simple-hearted of the Hindus and even of the ignorant and foolish followers of Islam, by his ways and manners... for three or four generations (of spiritual successors) they had kept this shop warm." The trigger for Guru Arjan's execution was his support for Jahangir's rebel son Khusrau Mirza, yet it is clear from Jahangir's own memoirs that he disliked Guru Arjan before then: "many times it occurred to me to put a stop to this vain affair or bring him into the assembly of the people of Islam." Guru Arjan's successor Guru Hargobind was imprisoned at Gwalior Fort but later released. He developed friendly relations with Jahangir and accompanied him on his journey to Kashmir just before the latter's death.

According to Jahangir's memoirs, he issued a firman banning Jain seorahs (monks) due to alleged scandalous behavior. However, the ban was quickly rescinded but Jahangir neglected to mention that in his memoirs. There is a wide variety of evidence that Jahangir had good relations with Jains and Jain sources themselves extol him. According to Ali, Jahangir wrote his memoirs with his intended audience of Persian-speaking Muslims in mind and sought to portray himself as an anti-idolatry sultan and thus "modified" facts. Jahangir's memoirs also omit the fact that three of his nephews at one point converted to Christianity with his permission, although they would later reverse their decision.

He issued 'Jahangiri coins' which had his own portrait. He even issued the zodiac series of gold and silver coins which had images of zodiac symbols alongside the radiating sun in the background, due to his faith in astrology. The sign of the zodiac was substituted for the month in which the coin was minted. All of this was considered haram by the ulema due to which his successor Shah Jahan ordered all those coins melted, accounting for their extreme rarity now.

Jahangir had a strong inclination toward pragmatism, reason and skepticism. He often remarked on unusual occurrences by stating, "This is so strange, it is recorded here," or dismissing claims that defied logic with, "It does not accord with reason, and my mind does not accept it." While he upheld religious tolerance, his patience did not extend to deceitful religious practices. He swiftly punished a self-proclaimed guru who displeased him, expelled a yogi while destroying his idol for performing a superstitious ritual with his visitors, and imprisoned a renowned Naqshbandi Muslim scholar for a while, who, in his view, held an inflated sense of self-importance and hoodwinked people by peddling mysticism. However, he was not without his own biases. He maintained a deep reverence for the tombs of saints and firmly believed in the power of holy men's prayers, particularly those he credited with enabling his birth. He held faith in astrology and ensured he gave alms to counteract the negative effects of unfavorable planetary alignments.

According to Richard M Eaton, Emperor Jahangir issued many edicts admonishing his nobles not to convert the religion of anybody by force, but the issuance of such orders also suggests that such conversions must have occurred during his rule in some measure. He continued the Mughals tradition of being scrupulously secular in outlook. Stability, loyalty, and revenue were the main focus, not the religious change among their subjects.

=== Art ===
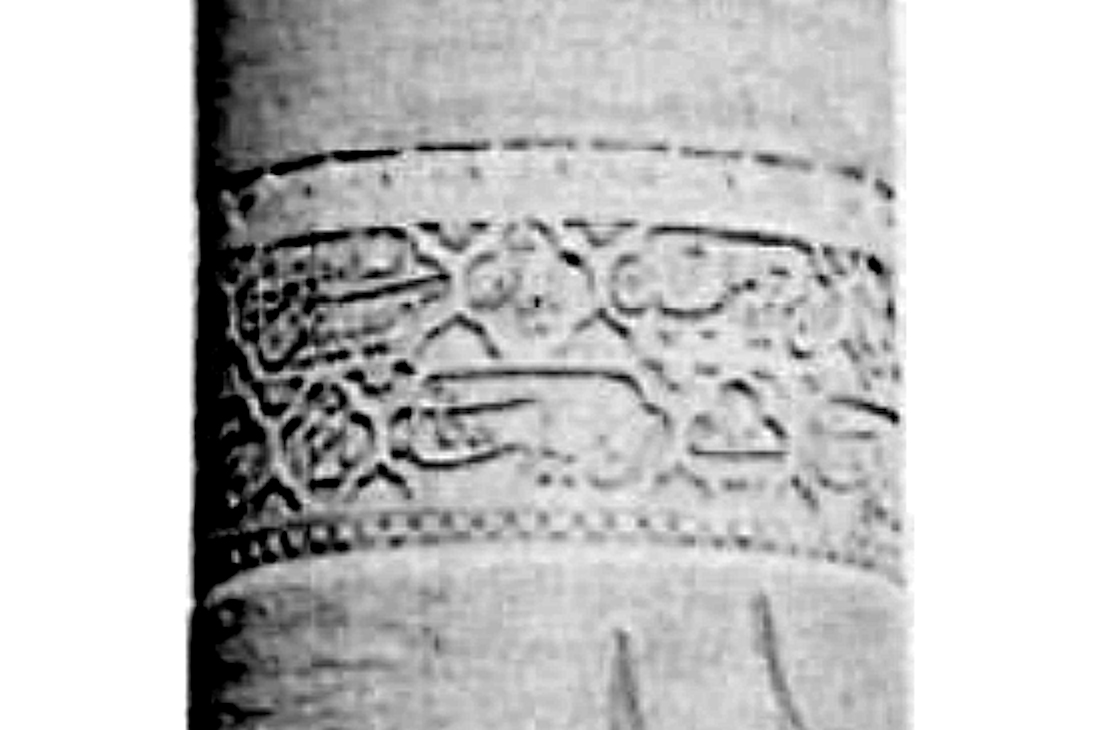
Jahangir's inscription on the Allahabad Pillar of Ashoka.

Jahangir was fascinated with art and architecture. In his autobiography, the Jahangirnama, Jahangir recorded events that occurred during his reign, descriptions of flora and fauna that he encountered, and other aspects of daily life, and commissioned court painters such as Ustad Mansur to paint detailed pieces that would accompany his vivid prose. For example, in 1619, he put pen to paper in awe of a royal falcon delivered to his court from the ruler of Iran: "What can I write of the beauty of this bird's colour? It had black markings, and every feather on its wings, back, and sides was extremely beautiful," and then recorded his command that Ustad Mansur paint a portrait of it after it perished. "Nadiri" was a type of exclusive clothing designed by Jahangir, reserved for his personal use and esteemed courtiers. Jahangir bound and displayed much of the art that he commissioned in elaborate albums of hundreds of images, sometimes organized around a theme such as zoology.

Jahangir himself was far from modest in his autobiography when he stated his prowess at being able to determine the artist of any portrait by simply looking at a painting. As he said:

...my liking for painting and my practice in judging it have arrived at such point when any work is brought before me, either of deceased artists or of those of the present day, without the names being told me, I say on the spur of the moment that is the work of such and such a man. And if there is a picture containing many portraits and each face is the work of a different master, I can discover which face is the work of each of them. If any other person has put in the eye and eyebrow of a face, I can perceive whose work the original face is and who has painted the eye and eyebrow.

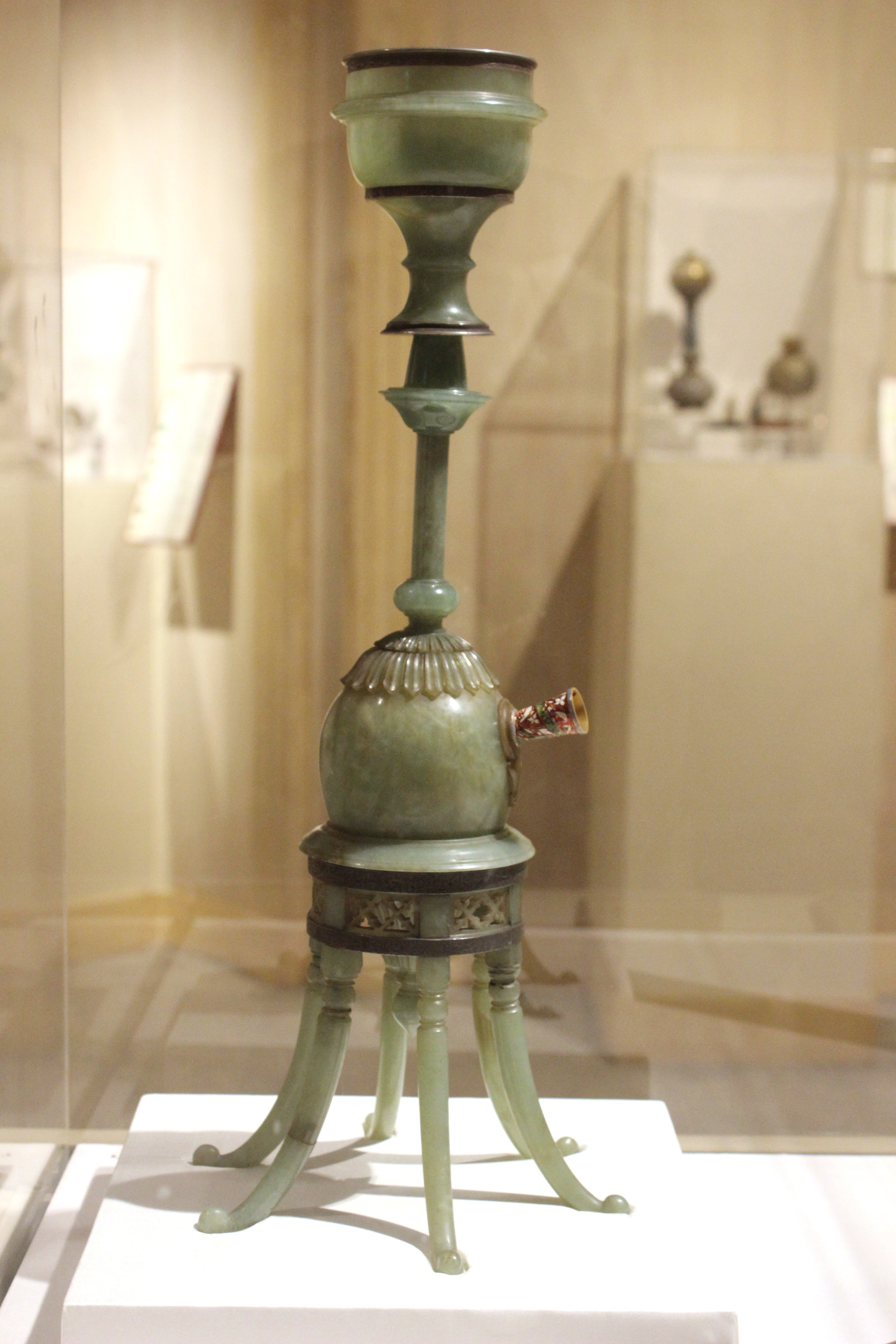
Jahangir's Jade hookah, National Museum, New Delhi

Jahangir took his connoisseurship of art very seriously. He also preserved paintings from Emperor Akbar's period. An excellent example of this is the painting done by Ustad Mansur of Musician Naubat Khan, son-in-law of legendary Tansen. In addition to their aesthetic qualities, paintings created under his reign were closely catalogued, dated and even signed, providing scholars with fairly accurate ideas as to when and in what context many of the pieces were created.

In the foreword to W. M. Thackston's translation of the Jahangirnama, Milo Cleveland Beach explains that Jahangir ruled during a time of considerably stable political control, and had the opportunity to order artists to create art to accompany his memoirs that were "in response to the emperor's current enthusiasms". He used his wealth and his luxury of free time to chronicle, in detail, the lush natural world that the Mughal Empire encompassed. At times, he would have artists travel with him for this purpose; when Jahangir was in Rahimabad, he had his painters on hand to capture the appearance of a specific tiger that he shot and killed because he found it to be particularly beautiful.

He had his artist Govardhan travel to Allahabad (today Prayagraj) to paint sadhus. This resulted in the earliest set of images depicting sadhus in all yogic positions.

The Jesuits had brought with them various books, engravings, and paintings and, when they saw the delight Akbar held for them, sent for more and more of the same to be given to the Mughals. They felt the Mughals were on the "verge of conversion", a notion which proved to be very false. Instead, both Akbar and Jahangir studied this artwork very closely and replicated and adapted it, adopting much of the early iconographic features and later the pictorial realism for which Renaissance art was known. Jahangir was notable for his pride in the ability of his court painters. A classic example of this is described in Sir Thomas Roe's diaries, in which the Emperor had his painters copy a European miniature several times creating a total of five miniatures. Jahangir then challenged Roe to pick out the original from the copies, a feat Sir Thomas Roe could not do, to the delight of Jahangir.

Jahangir was also revolutionary in his adaptation of European styles. A collection at the British Museum in London contains seventy-four drawings of Indian portraits dating from the time of Jahangir, including a portrait of the emperor himself. These portraits are a unique example of art during Jahangir's reign because faces were not drawn in full, including the shoulders as well as the head as these drawings are.

=== Politics ===
Jahangir is widely considered to have been a weak and incapable ruler. Orientalist Henry Beveridge (editor of the Tuzk-e-Jahangiri) compares Jahangir to the Roman emperor Claudius, for both were "weak men... in their wrong places as rulers... [and had] Jahangir been head of a Natural History Museum,... [he] would have been [a] better and happier man." Further he notes, "He made no addition to the imperial territories, but on the contrary, diminished them by losing Qandahar to the Persians. But possibly his peaceful temper, or his laziness, was an advantage, for it saved much bloodshed. His greatest fault as a king was his subservience to his wife, Nur-Jahan, and the consequent quarrel with his son, Shah Jahan, who was the ablest and best of his male children". Sir William Hawkins, who visited Jahangir's court in 1609, said: "In such short that what this man's father, called Ecber Padasha [Badshah Akbar], got of the Deccans, this king, Selim Sha [Jahangir] beginneth to lose." Italian writer and traveller, Niccolao Manucci, who worked under Jahangir's grandson, Dara Shikoh, began his discussion of Jahangir by saying: "It is a truth tested by experience that sons dissipate what their fathers gained in the sweat of their brow."

According to John F. Richards, Jahangir's frequent withdrawal to a private sphere of life was partly reflective of his indolence, brought on by his addiction to a considerable daily dosage of wine and opium.

=== Science ===
Jahangir had a keen interest in conducting his own "scientific" experiments, which reflected his deep fascination for the natural world. He found that the widely accepted belief about the aggressiveness of mountain sheep was not true. He investigated the effectiveness of bitumen for healing broken bones using a chicken as a specimen(bitumen proved ineffective). He compared the air quality of Ahmadabad and Mahmudabad by observing the rate of decay in sheep carcasses. Additionally, he actively engaged in animal husbandry and goat breeding, accurately estimated the gestation period of elephants, and studied the livers of lions and wolves to determine whether the location of their gall bladders, whether they were inside or outside the liver, correlated with courage.

== Popular culture ==
=== Films and television ===
- In the 1939 Hindi film Pukar, Jehangir was portrayed by Chandra Mohan.
- In the 1953 Hindi film Anarkali, he was portrayed by Pradeep Kumar.
- In the 1955 Hindi film Adil-E-Jahangir, he was portrayed by D. K. Sapru.
- In the 1955 Telugu film Anarkali, he was portrayed by ANR.
- In the 1958 Urdu film Anarkali, he was portrayed by Sudhir.
- In the 1960 Hindi film Mughal-e-Azam, he was portrayed by Dilip Kumar. Jalal Agha also played the younger Jahangir at the start of the film.
- In the 1966 Malayalam film Anarkali, he was portrayed by Prem Nazir.
- In the 1979 Telugu film Akbar Salim Anarkali, he was portrayed by Balakrishna.
- In the 1988 Shyam Benegal's TV Series Bharat Ek Khoj, he was portrayed by Vijay Arora.
- In the 2000 TV series Noorjahan, he was portrayed by Milnd Soman.
- In the 2005 Hindi film Taj Mahal: An Eternal Love Story, he was portrayed by Arbaaz Ali Khan.
- In the 2013 Ekta Kapoor's TV Series Jodha Akbar, he was portrayed by Ravi Bhatia. Ayaan Zubair Rahmani also played young Salim initially.
- In the 2014 Indu Sundaresan's TV Series Siyaasat, he was portrayed by Karanvir Sharma and Later Sudhanshu Pandey.
- In the 2014 Indian television sitcom Har Mushkil Ka Hal Akbar Birbal, Pawan Singh portrayed the role of prince Salim.
- In the 2018 Colors TV series Dastaan-E-Mohabbat Salim Anarkali, he is portrayed by Shaheer Sheikh.
- In the 2023 ZEE5's web series Taj: Divided by Blood, he is portrayed by Aashim Gulati.

=== Literature ===
- Jahangir is a principal character in Indu Sundaresan's award-winning historical novel The Twentieth Wife (2002) as well as in its sequel The Feast of Roses (2003).
- Jahangir is a principal character in Alex Rutherford's novel Ruler of the World (2011) as well as in its sequel The Tainted Throne (2012) of the series Empire of the Moghul.
- Jahangir is a character in novel Nur Jahan's Daughter (2005) written by Tanushree Poddar.
- Jahangir is a character in the novel Beloved Empress Mumtaz Mahal: A Historical Novel by Nina Consuelo Epton.
- Jahangir is a principal character in the novel Nurjahan: A historical novel by Jyoti Jafa.
- Jahangir is a character in the novel Taj, a Story of Mughal India by Timeri Murari.

== See also ==
- Jahangirnama
- Hiran Minar
- Sheikhupur, Badaun

== Appendix ==
=== Bibliography ===
- Abul Fazl 'Allami (1907). The Akbar Nama of Abu-l-Fazl. Vol. III. Translated by Beveridge, Henry. Calcutta, India: Asiatic Society.
- Andrea, Alfred J.; Overfield, James H. (2005). The Human Record: Sources of Global History. Vol. 2: Since 1500 (Fifth ed.). Boston: Houghton Mifflin. ISBN 978-0-618-37041-2.
- Alvi, Sajida S. (1989). "Religion and State during the Reign of Mughal Emperor Jahǎngǐr (1605–27): Nonjuristical Perspectives". Studia Islamica (69): 95–119. doi:10.2307/1596069. JSTOR 1596069.
- Balabanlilar, Lisa (2020). The Emperor Jahangir: Power and Kingship in Mughal India. London: I. B. Tauris. ISBN 978-1-83860-042-6.
- Findly, Ellison B. (April–June 1987). "Jahāngīr's Vow of Non-Violence". Journal of the American Oriental Society. 107 (2): 245–256. doi:10.2307/602833. JSTOR 602833.
- Gascoigne, Bamber; Gascoigne, Christina (1998) [1971]. The Great Moghuls. London: Constable. pp. 130–179. OCLC 39270860.
- Lefèvre, Corinne (2007). "Recovering a Missing Voice from Mughal India: The Imperial Discourse of Jahāngīr (r. 1605–1627) in his Memoirs" (PDF). Journal of the Economic and Social History of the Orient. 50 (4): 452–489. doi:10.1163/156852007783245034. S2CID 153839580.
- Jahangir, Emperor of Hindustan (1999). The Jahangirnama: Memoirs of Jahangir, Emperor of India. Translated by Thackston, Wheeler M. Oxford University Press. ISBN 978-0-19-512718-8.
- Mukherjee, Soma (2001). Royal Mughal Ladies and Their Contributions. Gyan Books. ISBN 978-81-212-0760-7.
- Lefèvre, Corinne (2022). Consolidating Empire: Power and Elites in Jahangir's India. Permanent Black.

Jahangir Timurid dynasty Born: 20 September 1569 Died: 8 November 1627
Regnal titles
Preceded by Akbar	Mughal Emperor; 1605–1627	Succeeded by Shah Jahan
