= Tuzk-e-Jahangiri =

Autobiography of Mughal emperor Jahangir (1569–1627)

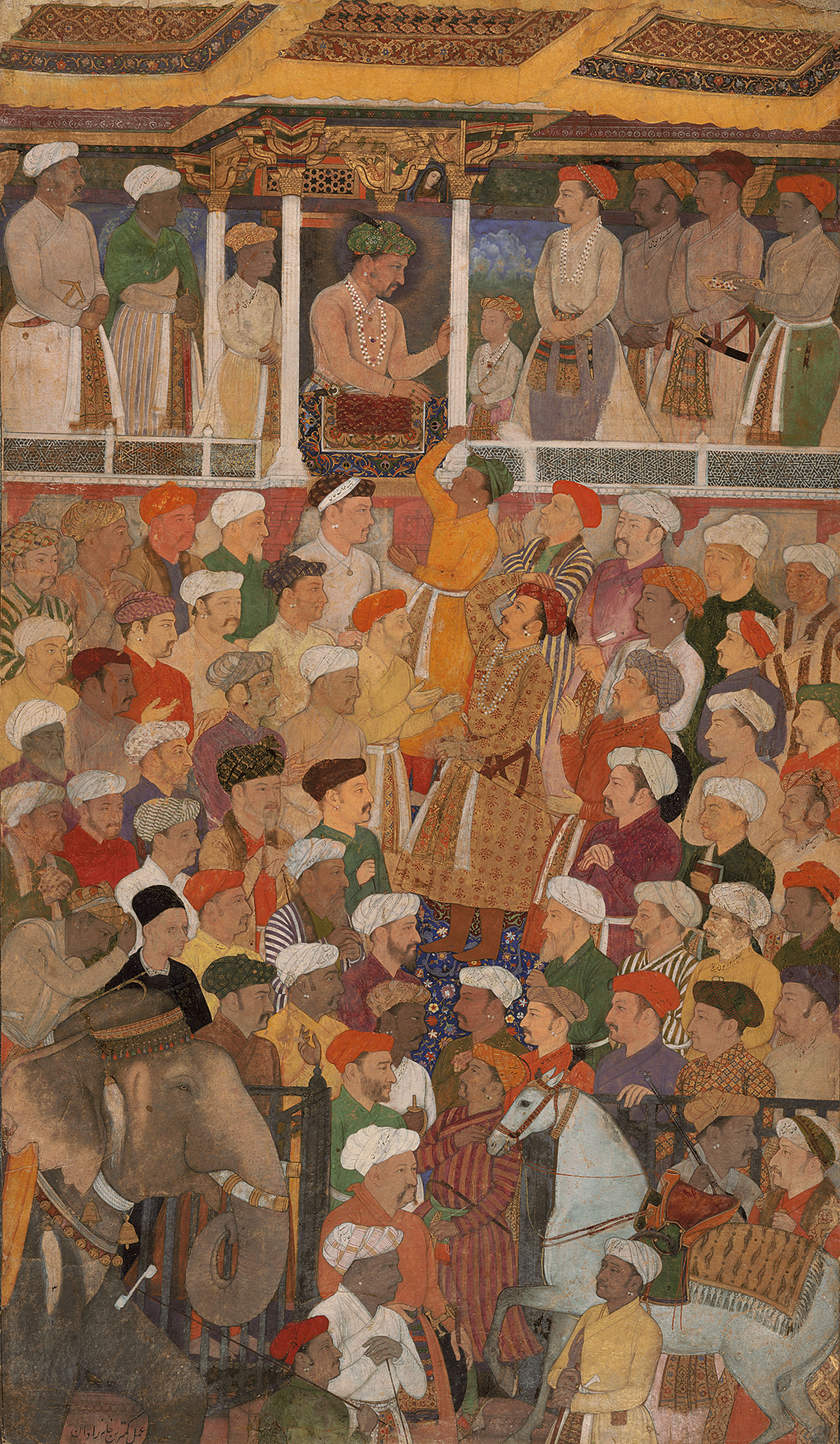
Abul Hasan and Manohar, with Jahangir in the Darbar, from the Jahangir-nama, c. 1620. Gouache on paper.

The Tuzk-e-Jahangiri (Persian: تزک جهانگیری) or Jahangirnama (Persian: جهانگیرنامه) is the autobiography of Mughal Emperor Jahangir (1569–1627). The Tuzk-e-Jahangiri is written in Persian, and follows the tradition of his great-grandfather, Babur (1487–1530), who had written the Baburnama; though Jahangir went a step further and besides writing on the history of his reign, he included details such as his reflections on art, politics, and information about his family.

He wrote the memoirs in stages through most of his life until 1622. His own manuscript was magnificently illustrated by his studio of painters, but the illustrations were very early dispersed, many being found in muraqqa (albums) compiled by his sons. Several of these illustrations are in the British Library.

== Overview ==
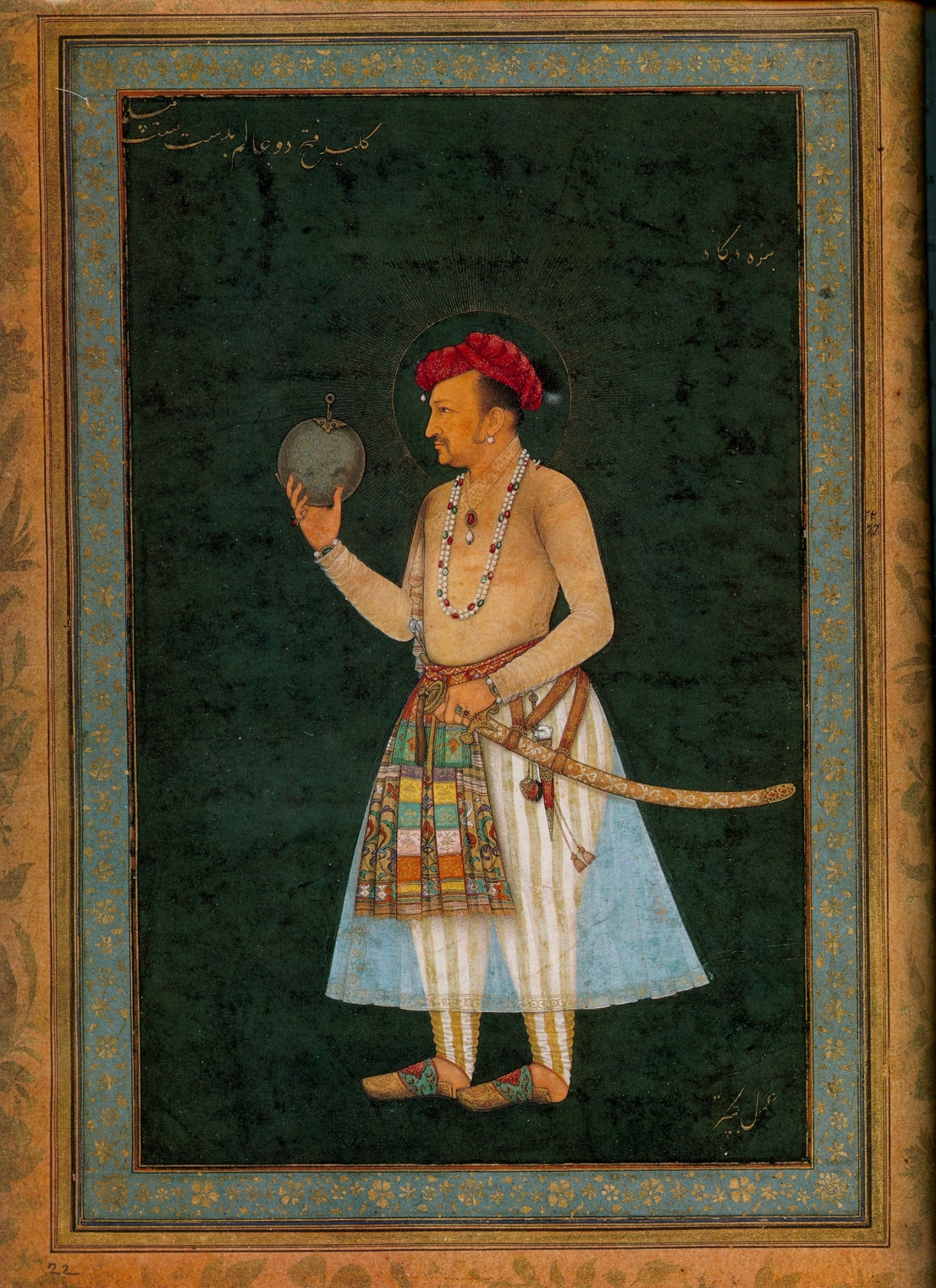
Jahangir holding a globe, 1614–1618.

The text details the first 19 years of his reign (from 1605–1623), but he gave up the writing of his memoirs in 1621. The complete Tuzk-e-Jahangiri written by Jahangir himself is housed in the National Museum of India since the 1950s. He then entrusted the task to Mu‘tamad Khān, the author of the Iqbal-nama, who continued the memoirs at the start of 1623. From here, it was taken up by Muhammad Hadi, who continued it to Jahangir's death in 1627. It forms an important reference point with respect to the era of his father Akbar and his official chronicle, the Akbarnama. The first important printed version of Jahangirnama was by Sayyid Ahmad, printed at Ghazipur in 1863 and at Aligarh in 1864.

Jahangir's autobiography reflects his views on various political, religious and social issues. He noted many of his local legislative policies. Among them were his decrees to manage and regulate the jagirdars. These were people who held the jagir, the emperor's land grant title. The jagirdars were to receive the income of the land and use it to mainly finance the maintenance of troops and addressing town needs. Jahangir made various attempts to halt corruption by the jagirdars. He prohibited each of them from using the money for personal profit by ordering that part of the land income go to hospitals and infirmaries and for each town to be equipped with mosques. Jahangir also kept the jagirdars from gaining interest in family or land riches by ordering the jagirdars to seek his approval before marrying someone from the town they ruled in. He also spoke of his trust in his beloved wife Nur Jahan, praising her courage and skill and acknowledging the influence she had on him.

== See also ==
- Babarnama
- Akbarnama
- Shahjahannama
- Tuzk-e-Taimuri

== Work online ==
- The Tūzuk-i-Jahangīrī Or Memoirs Of Jahāngīr, Alexander Rogers and Henry Beveridge. Royal Asiatic Society, 1909–1914.

== Bibliography ==
- Henry Miers Elliot (1875). Wakiʼat-i Jahangiri. Lahore: Sheikh Mubarak Ali.
- Jahangir, Emperor of Hindustan (1829). Memoirs of the Emperor Jahanguir. Translated by Price, Major David. London: J. Murray.
- Jahangir, Emperor of Hindustan (1909). Beveridge, Henry (ed.). The Tuzuk-i-Janhangīrī or Memoirs of Jahāngīr. Translated by Rogers, Alexander. London: Royal Asiatic Society.
- Jahangir, Emperor of Hindustan (1999). The Jahangirnama: Memoirs of Jahangir, Emperor of India. Translated by Thackston, Wheeler M. Oxford University Press. ISBN 978-0-19-512718-8.
- Losty, J. P. Roy, Malini (eds), Mughal India: Art, Culture and Empire, 2013, British Library, ISBN 0712358706, 9780712358705
