= Baha al-Din Baghdadi =

- Born: Baghdadak, Khwarazm
- Died: after 1192
- Occupations: Secretary, poet
- Relatives: Majd al-Din Baghdadi (brother)

Baha al-Din Baghdadi (Persian: بها الدین بغدادی; died after 1192) was a Persian secretary of the Khwarazmshahs, who is notable for his expertise in Persian letter-writing. He served as the head of the divan-e insha (chancellery) under Ala ad-Din Tekish (r. 1172–1200).

== Biography ==
The background and early life of Baha al-Din is obscure. He was a native of a place called Baghdadak in the Central Asian region of Khwarazm, and had an elder brother named Majd al-Din Baghdadi, a prominent mystic in the 12th and 13th centuries. Baha al-Din first rose to prominence during the reign of the Khwarazmshah Ala ad-Din Tekish (r. 1172–1200), under whom he served as the head of the divan-e insha (chancellery). Baha al-Din was jailed twice due to his association with the Khwarazmian court; first for a short time after a disagreement with Tekish's vizier Nizam al-Mulk Shams al-Din Mas'ud Heravi, and later, he was imprisoned at Marv from 1186 to 1189 by Tekish's brother and rival for the throne, Sultanshah. It was during his second imprisonment that he wrote the Persian prose of Risala-ye habsiya ("Message from prison"). He was released from jail after the brothers made peace, and rejoined Tekish. According to the Haft eqlim of Amin Razi (died in the 17th-century), Baha al-Din retained his post during the reign of the next Khwarazmshah, Muhammad II (r. 1200–1220), which according to the Iranologist Clifford Edmund Bosworth, however, is "hard to verity." Baha al-Din disappears in records after 1192.

Baha al-Din distinguished himself as a prominent writer through the quality of prose writings. His work was praised by poets such as Awfi and Sa'd al-Din Varavini.

== Sources ==
- Bosworth, Clifford Edmund (1988). "Bahāʾ-al-Dīn Baḡdādī". In Yarshater, Ehsan (ed.). Encyclopædia Iranica. Vol. III/4: Bačča(-ye) Saqqā–Bahai Faith III. London and New York: Routledge & Kegan Paul. pp. 430–431. ISBN 978-0-71009-116-1.
- Bosworth, Clifford Edmund (2008). "Khwarazmshahs i. Descendants of the line of Anuštigin". In Yarshater, Ehsan (ed.). Encyclopædia Iranica. Vol. XIV: Isfahan IX–Jobbāʾi. London and New York: Routledge & Kegan Paul. ISBN 978-1-934283-08-0.
