= Ahmad Tehrani =

Iranian bureaucrat and poet (16th century)

- Born: 1540s Safavid Iran
- Died: 1590s Safavid Iran
- Occupations: Bureaucrat and poet
- Children: Amin Razi
- Relatives: Khvajeh Lohrasb (father); Khvajeh Mohammad-Sharif (brother); Khvajegi (brother); Omidi (uncle); Mirza Ghiyas Beg (nephew); Mohammad-Taher Wasli (nephew); Shapur (nephew)
- Writing career
- Language: Persian

Ahmad Tehrani (Persian: احمد تهرانی) was a bureaucrat and poet in 16th-century Safavid Iran, who served as the kalantar (mayor) of Tehran under Shah Tahmasp I (r. 1524–1576), Ismail II (r. 1576–1577) and Mohammad Khodabanda (r. 1578–1587). He was the father of Amin Razi, the author of the biographical work Haft eqlim.

== Life ==
Ahmad Tehrani belonged to a family renowned for their knowledge and interest in literature, many of them occupying high positions in the government. The birth and death dates of Ahmad is unknown, it can be presumed that he lived from the 1540s to the 1590s, based on the information of the Haft eqlim by his son Amin Razi and the biographical work Tohfa-ye Sami by the Safavid prince Sam Mirza. Ahmad was the son of Khvajeh Lohrasb, a distinguished poet in Tehran. His uncle was Omidi, a poet and kadkhuda (chief) of Tehran. His brother was Khvajeh Mohammad-Sharif, a statesman and governor, who was the father of Mirza Ghiyas Beg and Mohammad-Taher Wasli, both whom served as bureaucrats and poets in the court of the Mughal emperor Jahangir (r. 1605–1627). Ahmad's other brother Khvajegi and the latters son Shapur were poets.

Ahmad was among the notable locals that the Safavid ruler Shah Tahmasp I (r. 1524–1576) came to know once he turned his attention to Tehran and erected a fortress around it. According to Amin Razi, Ahmad was bold in his approach to important matters and was highly interested in having gardens and qanats built. According to the modern Iranian historian Morteza Mousavi, this suggests that Ahmad had achieved a certain degree of prominence during that period.

Qajar-era maps of Tehran show three caravanserais and a market in the Oudlajan and Bazaar districts named "Ahmad-e Kur" ("Ahmad the blind"), which most likely refers to Ahmad, based on wealth and status in Tehran, as well as building activities. Ahmad's blindess is also seemingly referenced by Shah Tahmasp I in a poem. However, no source directly mentions his blindness. Ahmad was eventually installed as the kalantar (mayor) of Tehran and overseer of the royal estates by Shah Tahmasp I. Mohammad Khodabanda (r. 1578–1587) was the last Safavid ruler that Ahmad is recorded to have served as kalantar. Ahmad most likely died during the reign of Mohammad Khodabanda's successor Shah Abbas I (r. 1587–1629), as he is not mentioned by Amin Razi during this period.

Ahmad occasionally wrote poems, of which only three verses have survived.

== Sources ==
- Memon, M. U. (2020). "Amīn Aḥmad Rāzī". Encyclopaedia Iranica Online. Brill. doi:10.1163/2330-4804_EIRO_COM_5303.
- Mousavi, Morteza (2023). "احمد تهرانی، کلانتر". The Great Islamic Encyclopaedia (in Persian).
