= Cairo pentagonal tiling =

Tiling of the plane by pentagons

- Equilateral form of the Cairo tiling
- Type: Pentagonal tiling
- Tile: irregular pentagons
- Dual: Snub square tiling
- Properties: face-transitive

In geometry, a Cairo pentagonal tiling is a tessellation of the Euclidean plane by congruent convex pentagons, formed by overlaying two tessellations of the plane by hexagons and named for its use as a paving design in Cairo. It is also called MacMahon's net after Percy Alexander MacMahon, who depicted it in his 1921 publication New Mathematical Pastimes. John Horton Conway called it a 4-fold pentille.

Infinitely many different pentagons can form this pattern, belonging to two of the 15 families of convex pentagons that can tile the plane. Their tilings have varying symmetries; all are face-symmetric. One particular form of the tiling, dual to the snub square tiling, has tiles with the minimum possible perimeter among all pentagonal tilings. Another, overlaying two flattened tilings by regular hexagons, is the form used in Cairo and has the property that every edge is collinear with infinitely many other edges.

In architecture, beyond Cairo, the Cairo tiling has been used in Mughal architecture in 18th-century India, in the early 20th-century Laeiszhalle in Germany, and in many modern buildings and installations. It has also been studied as a crystal structure and appears in the art of M. C. Escher.

== Structure and classification ==
The union of all edges of a Cairo tiling is the same as the union of two tilings of the plane by hexagons. Each hexagon of one tiling surrounds two vertices of the other tiling, and is divided by the hexagons of the other tiling into four of the pentagons in the Cairo tiling. Infinitely many different pentagons can form Cairo tilings, all with the same pattern of adjacencies between tiles and with the same decomposition into hexagons, but with varying edge lengths, angles, and symmetries. The pentagons that form these tilings can be grouped into two different infinite families, drawn from the 15 families of convex pentagons that can tile the plane, and the five families of pentagon found by Karl Reinhardt in 1918 that can tile the plane isohedrally (all tiles symmetric to each other).

One of these two families consists of pentagons that have two non-adjacent right angles, with a pair of sides of equal length meeting at each of these right angles. Any pentagon meeting these requirements tiles the plane by copies that, at the chosen right angled corners, are rotated by a right angle with respect to each other. At the pentagon sides that are not adjacent to one of these two right angles, two tiles meet, rotated by a 180° angle with respect to each other. The result is an isohedral tiling, meaning that any pentagon in the tiling can be transformed into any other pentagon by a symmetry of the tiling. These pentagons and their tiling are often listed as "type 4" in the listing of types of pentagon that can tile. For any type 4 Cairo tiling, twelve of the same tiles can also cover the surface of a cube, with one tile folded across each cube edge and three right angles of tiles meeting at each cube vertex, to form the same combinatorial structure as a regular dodecahedron.

The other family of pentagons forming the Cairo tiling are pentagons that have two complementary angles at non-adjacent vertices, each having the same two side lengths incident to it. In their tilings, the vertices with complementary angles alternate around each degree-four vertex. The pentagons meeting these constraints are not generally listed as one of the 15 families of pentagons that tile; rather, they are part of a larger family of pentagons (the "type 2" pentagons) that tile the plane isohedrally in a different way.

Bilaterally symmetric Cairo tilings are formed by pentagons that belong to both the type 2 and type 4 families. The basketweave brick paving pattern can be seen as a degenerate case of the bilaterally symmetric Cairo tilings, with each brick (a $1\times 2$ rectangle) interpreted as a pentagon with four right angles and one 180° angle.

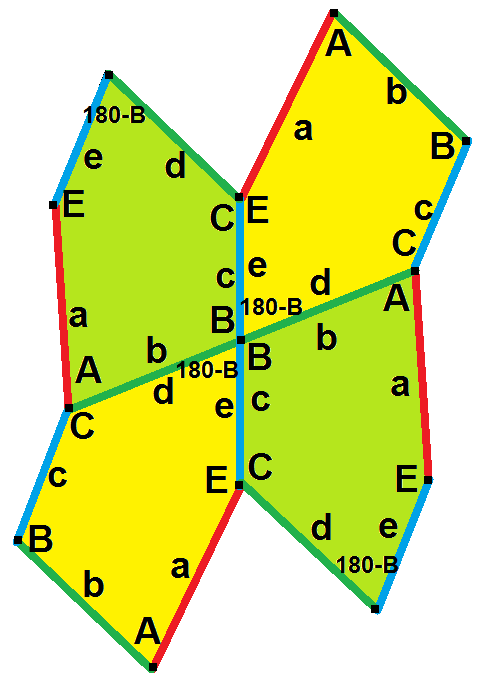

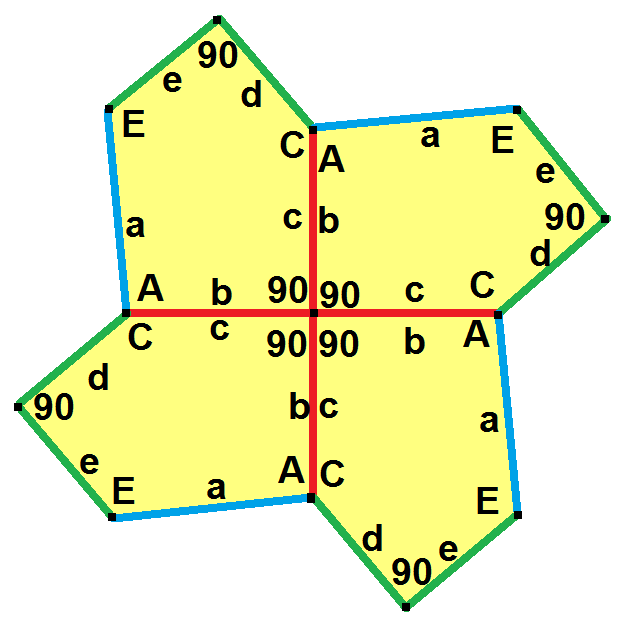
Type 4 tiles have non-adjacent right angles between pairs of equal-length sides

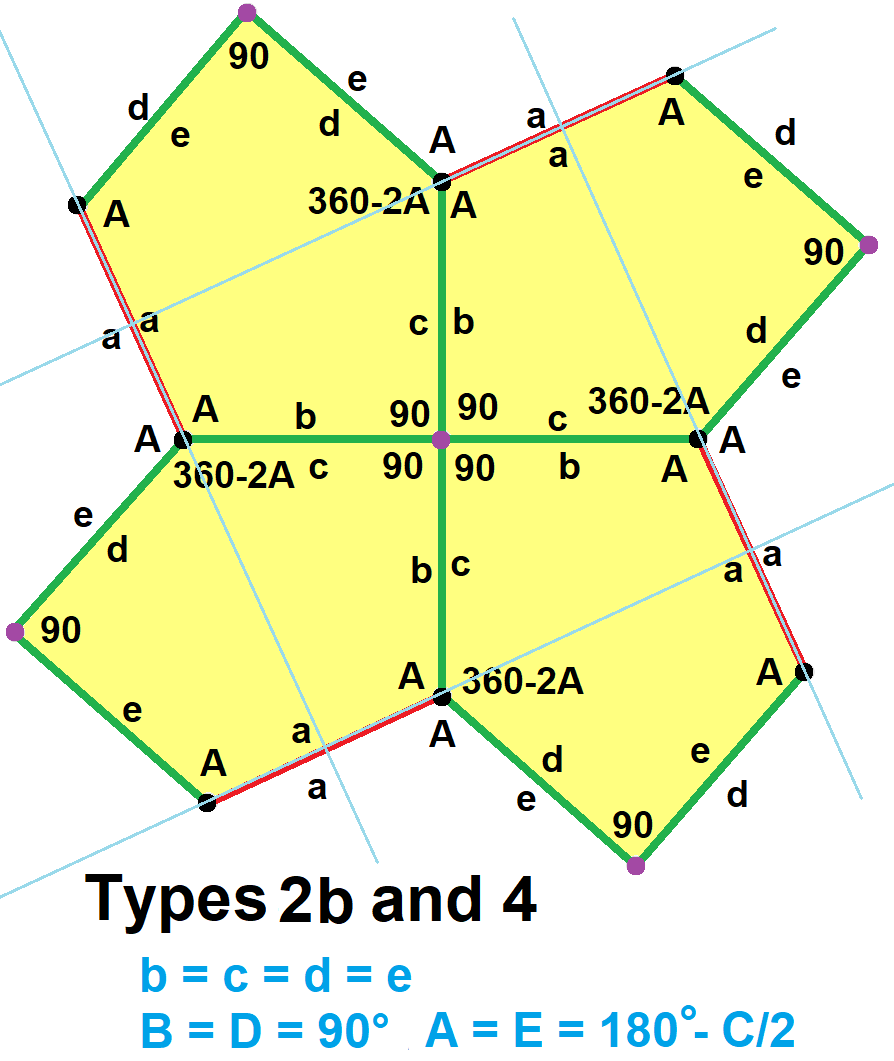
Bilaterally symmetric tilings (belonging to both types) use tiles with non-adjacent right angles and four equal edges
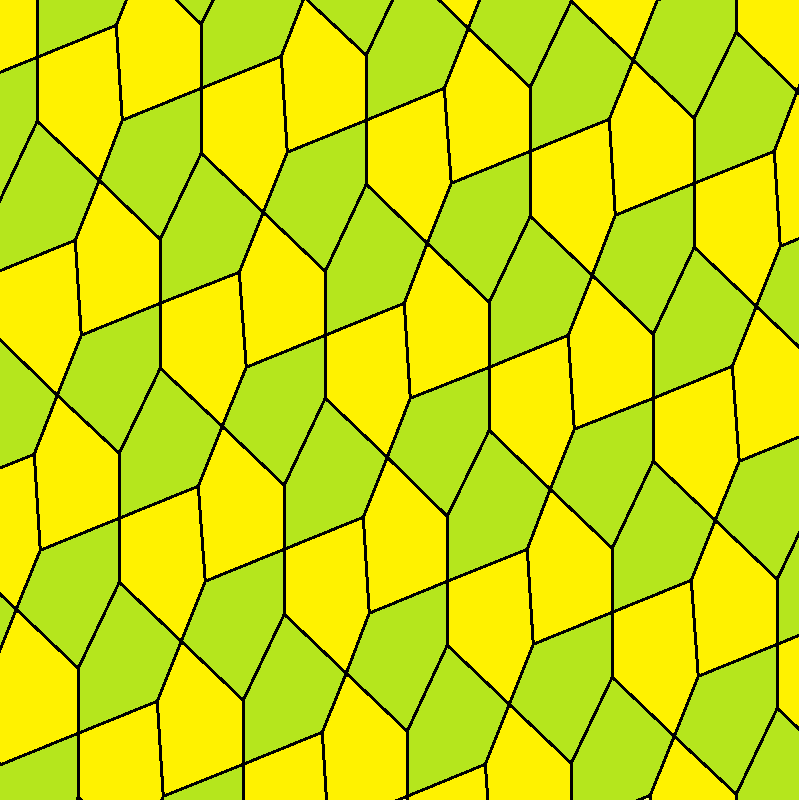
Type 2 Cairo tiling, with coloring showing reflected and non-reflected tiles

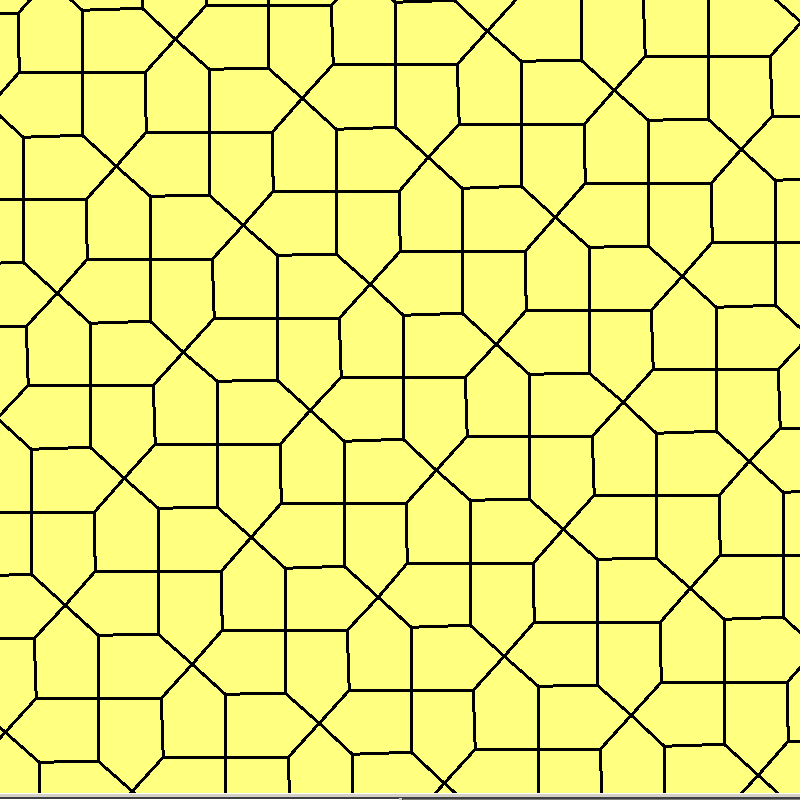
In a type 4 Cairo tiling, the pentagons can be bilaterally symmetric even when the tiling isn't

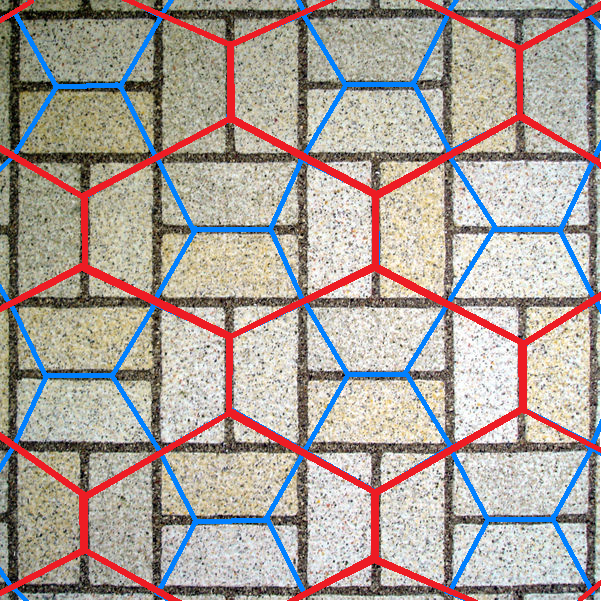
The basketweave, a degenerate bilaterally symmetric tiling, with non-degenerate tiling overlaid

It is possible to assign six-dimensional half-integer coordinates to the pentagons of the tiling, in such a way that the number of edge-to-edge steps between any two pentagons equals the L^{1} distance between their coordinates. The six coordinates of each pentagon can be grouped into two triples of coordinates, in which each triple gives the coordinates of a hexagon in an analogous three-dimensional coordinate system for each of the two overlaid hexagon tilings. The number of tiles that are $i$ steps away from any given tile, for $i=0,1,2,\dots$, is given by the coordination sequence
$$1, 5, 11, 16, 21, 27, 32, 37, \dots$$
in which, after the first three terms, each term differs by 16 from the term three steps back in the sequence. One can also define analogous coordination sequences for the vertices of the tiling instead of for its tiles, but because there are two types of vertices (of degree three and degree four) there are two different coordination sequences arising in this way. The degree-four sequence is the same as for the square grid.

== Special cases ==
=== Catalan tiling ===
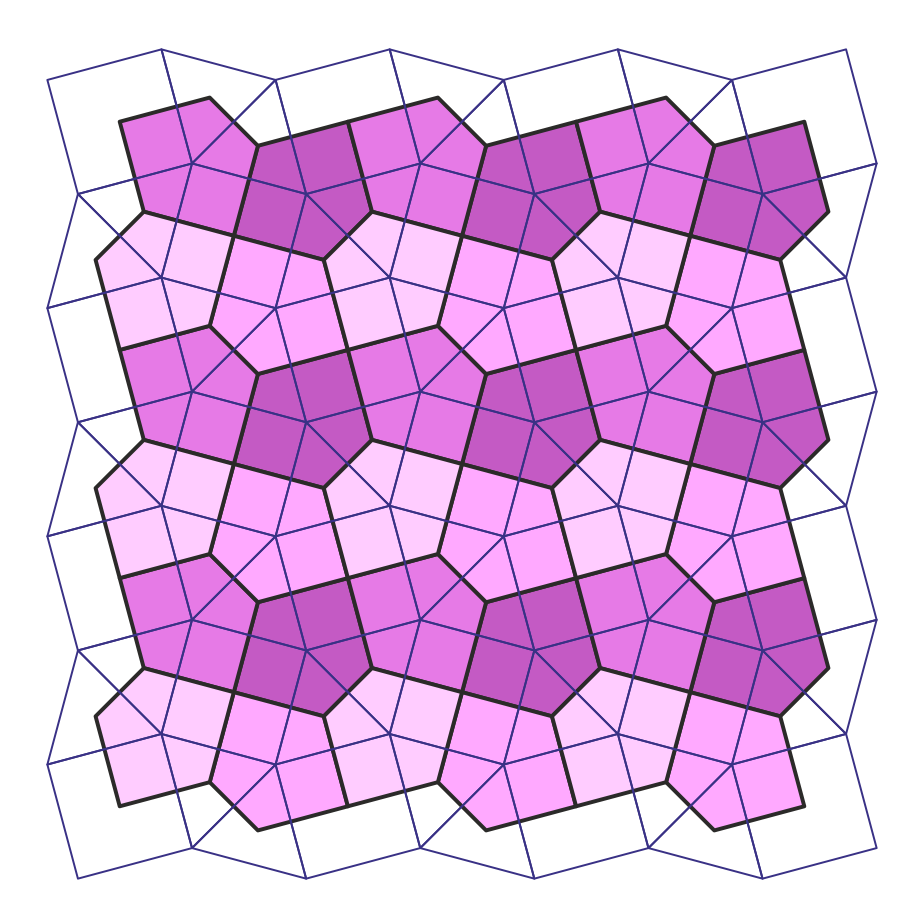
Cairo tiling as the dual of the snub square tiling

Geometry of pentagons for the dual snub square tiling

The snub square tiling, made of two squares and three equilateral triangles around each vertex, has a bilaterally symmetric Cairo tiling as its dual tiling. The Cairo tiling can be formed from the snub square tiling by placing a vertex of the Cairo tiling at the center of each square or triangle of the snub square tiling, and connecting these vertices by edges when they come from adjacent tiles. Its pentagons can be circumscribed around a circle. They have four long edges and one short one with lengths in the ratio $1:\sqrt{3}-1$. The angles of these pentagons form the sequence 120°, 120°, 90°, 120°, 90°.

The snub square tiling is an Archimedean tiling, and as the dual to an Archimedean tiling this form of the Cairo pentagonal tiling is a Catalan tiling or Laves tiling. It is one of two monohedral pentagonal tilings that, when the tiles have unit area, minimizes the perimeter of the tiles. The other is also a tiling by circumscribed pentagons with two right angles and three 120° angles, but with the two right angles adjacent; there are also infinitely many tilings formed by combining both kinds of pentagon.

=== Tilings with collinear edges ===
Collinear form of Cairo tiling, with integer-coordinate pentagons, formed by flattening two perpendicular regular hexagonal tilings in perpendicular directions

Pentagons with integer vertex coordinates $(\pm 2, 0)$, $(\pm 3,3)$, and $(0,4)$, with four equal sides shorter than the remaining side in the ratio $\sqrt{10}:4$, form a Cairo tiling whose two hexagonal tilings can be formed by flattening two perpendicular tilings by regular hexagons in perpendicular directions, by a ratio of $\sqrt 3$. This form of the Cairo tiling inherits the property of the tilings by regular hexagons (unchanged by the flattening), that every edge is collinear with infinitely many other edges.

=== Tilings with equal side lengths ===
The regular pentagon cannot form Cairo tilings, as it does not tile the plane without gaps. There is a unique equilateral pentagon that can form a type 4 Cairo tiling; it has five equal sides but its angles are unequal, and its tiling is bilaterally symmetric. Infinitely many other equilateral pentagons can form type 2 Cairo tilings.

== Applications ==
Several streets in Cairo have been paved with the collinear form of the Cairo tiling; this application is the origin of the name of the tiling. As of 2019 this pattern can still be seen as a surface decoration for square tiles near the Qasr El Nil Bridge and the El Behoos Metro station; other versions of the tiling are visible elsewhere in the city. Some authors including Martin Gardner have written that this pattern is used more widely in Islamic architecture, and although this claim appears to have been based on a misunderstanding, patterns resembling the Cairo tiling are visible on the 17th-century Tomb of I'timād-ud-Daulah in India, and the Cairo tiling itself has been found on a 17th-century Mughal jali.

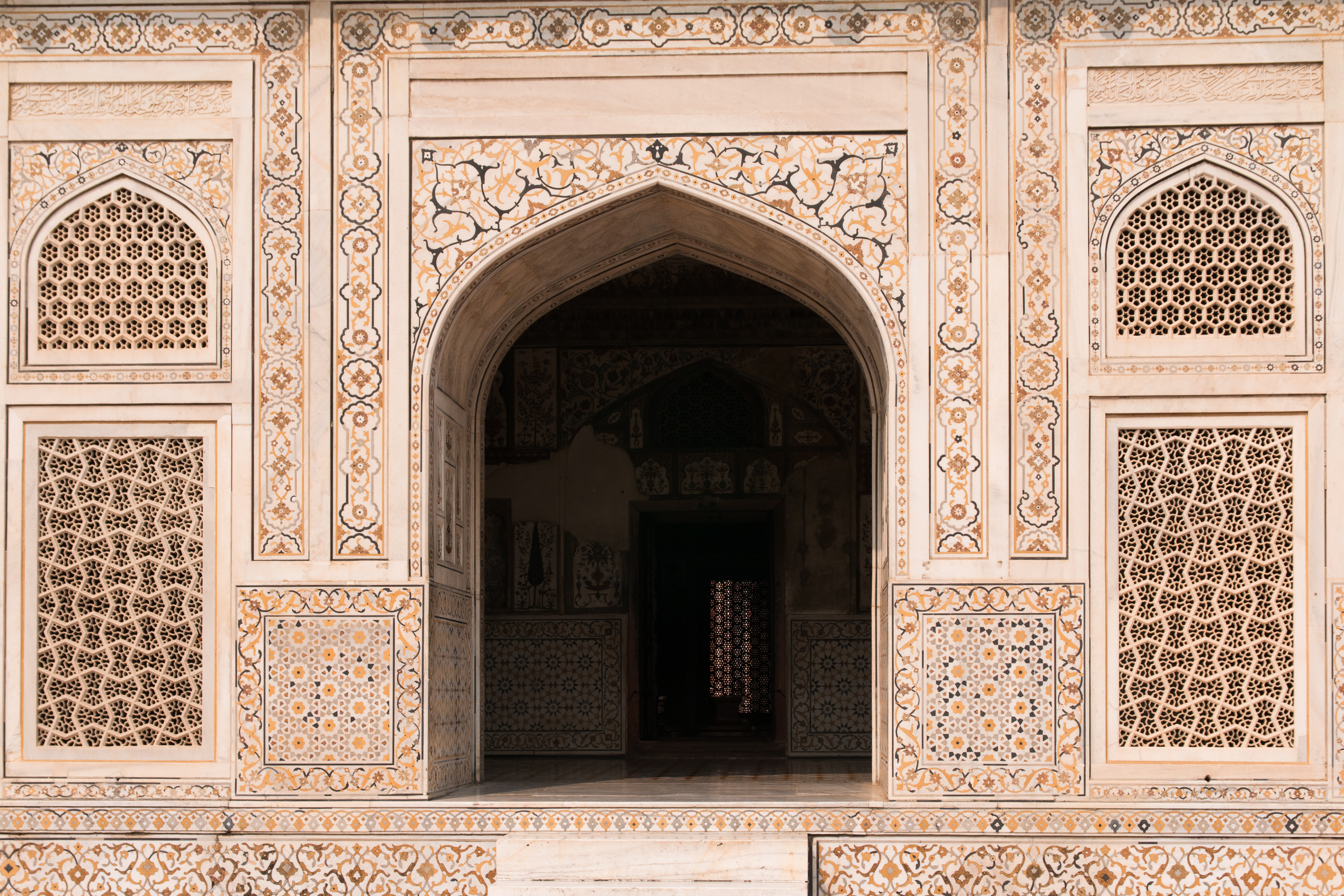
Tomb of I'timād-ud-Daulah, with rectangular side panels resembling the Cairo tiling

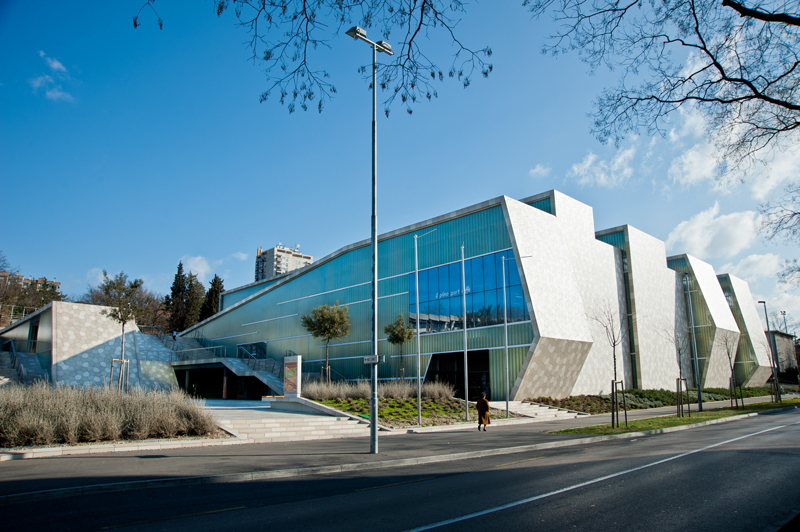
Centar Zamet, with the Cairo tiling visible on its walls

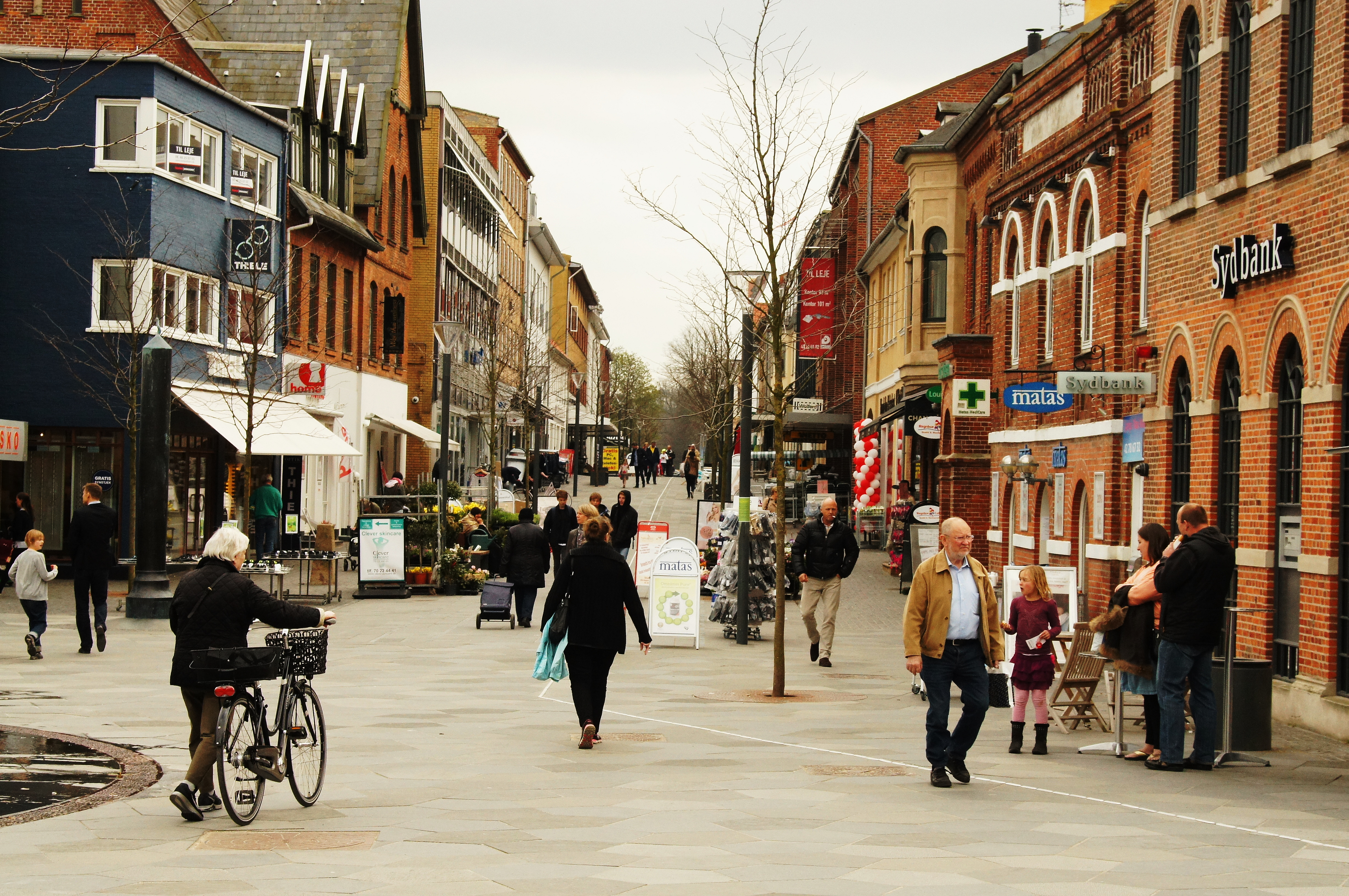
Cairo tiling in Hørsholm, Denmark
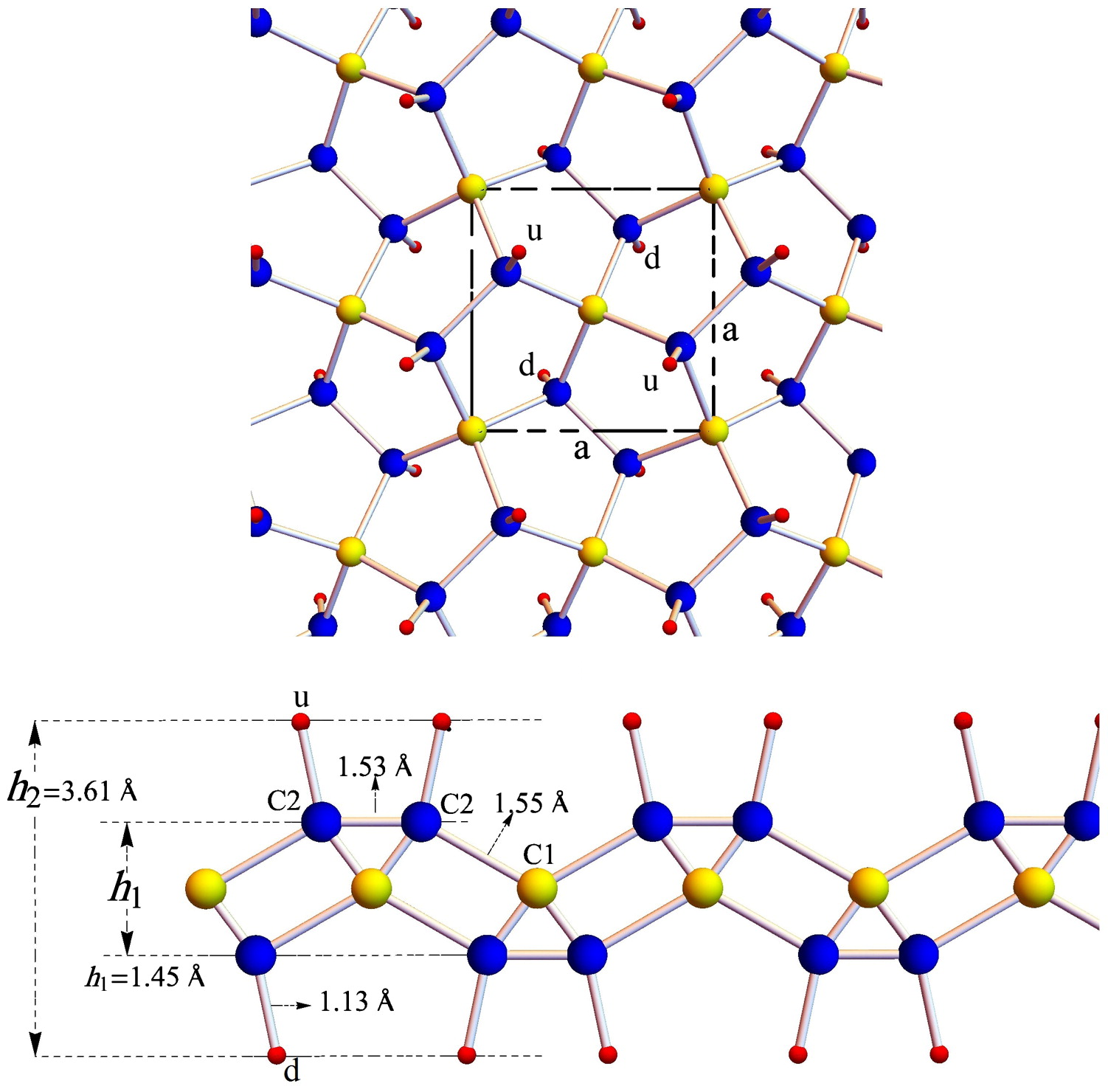
Penta-graphane

One of the earliest publications on the Cairo tiling as a decorative pattern occurs in a book on textile design from 1906. Inventor H. C. Moore filed a US patent on tiles forming this pattern in 1908. At roughly the same time, Villeroy & Boch created a line of ceramic floor tiles in the Cairo tiling pattern, used in the foyer of the Laeiszhalle in Hamburg, Germany. The Cairo tiling has been used as a decorative pattern in many recent architectural designs; for instance, the city center of Hørsholm, Denmark, is paved with this pattern, and the Centar Zamet, a sports hall in Croatia, uses it both for its exterior walls and its paving tiles.

In crystallography, this tiling has been studied at least since 1911. It has been proposed as the structure for layered hydrate crystals, certain compounds of bismuth and iron, and penta-graphene, a hypothetical compound of pure carbon. In the penta-graphene structure, the edges of the tiling incident to degree-four vertices form single bonds, while the remaining edges form double bonds. In its hydrogenated form, penta-graphane, all bonds are single bonds and the carbon atoms at the degree-three vertices of the structure have a fourth bond connecting them to hydrogen atoms.

The Cairo tiling has been described as one of M. C. Escher's "favorite geometric patterns". He used it as the basis for his drawing Shells and Starfish (1941), in the bees-on-flowers segment of his Metamorphosis III (1967–1968), and in several other drawings from 1967–1968. An image of this tessellation has also been used as the cover art for the 1974 first edition of H. S. M. Coxeter's book Regular Complex Polytopes.
