= Amīn Rāzī =

16th and 17th century geographer

Amin Razi
- Born: 16th-century Safavid Iran
- Died: 17th-century Safavid Iran
- Occupations: Geographer, Writer
- Relatives: Ahmad Tehrani (father); Khvajeh Lohrasb (grandfather); Khvajeh Mohammad-Sharif (uncle); Khvajegi (uncle); Omidi (great-uncle); Mirza Ghiyas Beg (cousin); Mohammad-Taher Wasli (cousin); Shapur (cousin)
- Writing career
- Language: Persian
- Notable work: Haft eqlim

Amin Ahmad Razi (Persian: امین احمد رازی), was the author of the Haft eqlim (lit. 'Seven Climes'), a Persian geographical and biographical encyclopedia composed in 1593–94.

Amin Razi was born in Ray, Persia into a prestigious family; his father was Ahmad Tehrani, the mayor of Ray by appointment of Tahmasp I (r. 1524–1576). His paternal uncle was Khvajeh Mohammad-Sharif, a poet and minister to the governor of Khorasan and later to the Shah.

Amin Razi states that he completed his encyclopedia in AH 1002 (1593/4) after six years of work, although the work as extant includes additions of younger date. His dates of birth and death are unknown. He may have visited Mughal India during the reign of Akbar.

Haft eqlim (also Haft iqlīm) provides extensive historical, biographical and topographical information, arranged by "clime", i.e. the major division of the known world by geographic latitude according to Ptolemy. The total number of biographies in the work is 1,560, in many cases giving more detail than those found in medieval works such as Lubab ul-Albab or Tazkirat al-Awliya. The work also cited samples of poetry which is not recorded elsewhere, and some prose passages, e.g. by Ubayd Zakani.

Amin Razi's sources have been researched by Naqawī, who identified thirty-nine. Ethé provides a table of the contents of the work. The work survives in numerous manuscripts. The only complete edition is by Jawād Fāżel (1961). The Calcutta edition by Ross et al. is superior to Fāżel's but is incomplete, omitting the fourth clime (which encompasses more than half of the work).

== Sources ==
- Memon, M. U. (2020). "Amīn Aḥmad Rāzī". Encyclopaedia Iranica Online. Brill. doi:10.1163/2330-4804_EIRO_COM_5303.
