= Khvajeh Mohammad-Sharif =

Persian politician and poet (16th century)

Khvajeh Mohammad-Sharif (Note: Also spelled "Khwaja Muhammad-Sharif".) (Persian: خواجه محمد شریف) was a Persian statesman, who occupied the post of vizier of several Safavid provinces. He was also a poet, who wrote under the pen name Hejri (هجری).

== Biography ==
Mohammad-Sharif was a native of Tehran—his brother Ahmad Tehrani had been appointed the mayor (kalantar) of Ray by Shah Tahmasp I (r. 1524–1576).

After the death of his father, Mohammad-Sharif left for Khorasan, where he served as the vizier of Mohammad Khan Tekkelu and his son Tatar Soltan, who was the governor of the Safavid province of Khorasan.

Mohammad-Sharif was later listed under the service of Shah Tahmasp I, where he in the start served as the vizier of Yazd, Abarkuh, and Biabanak for seven years.

Thereafter, he was appointed as the vizier of Isfahan, one of the most prominent offices in the area. There, he became known for his rational approach to its inhabitants and for his skillful ability to resolve frictions. He died there in 1576/7.

He was married to a daughter of Aqa Mulla Dawatdar.

After his death, his youngest son, Mirza Ghiyas Beg, fell into disgrace for unknown reasons, and thus chose to relocate to Mughal India, where he became a high-ranking statesman, and eventually the chief minister of Emperor Jahangir (r. 1605–1627). (Note: Ghiyas Beg's son Abu'l-Hasan Asaf Khan achieved high ranks at the Mughal court, whilst his daughter Nur Jahan became the most beloved wife of the Mughal emperor Jahangir. Ghiyas Beg's granddaughter, Mumtaz Mahal, was the wife of Jahangir's son and successor Shah Jahan (r. 1628-1658), and was later buried in the iconic Taj Mahal.) Another son of Mohammad-Sharif, Mohammad-Taher Wasli, was a learned man who composed poetry under the pen name of Wasli.

== Sources ==
- Banks Findley, Ellison (11 Feb 1993). Nur Jahan: Empress of Mughal India. Oxford, UK: Nur Jahan : Empress of Mughal India. ISBN 9780195074888.
- Shokoohy, Mehrdad (2001). "GĪĀṮ BEG, ʿEʿTEMĀD-AL-DAWLA". Encyclopaedia Iranica, Vol. X, Fasc. 6. pp. 594–595.
