= Equilateral pentagon =

Pentagon with all sides equal but the angles may not be equal

Equilateral pentagon built with four equal circles disposed in a chain.

In geometry, an equilateral pentagon is a polygon in the Euclidean plane with five sides of equal length. Its five vertex angles can take a range of sets of values, thus permitting it to form a family of pentagons. In contrast, the regular pentagon is unique, because it is equilateral and moreover it is equiangular (its five angles are equal; the measure is 108 degrees).

Four intersecting equal circles arranged in a closed chain are sufficient to determine a convex equilateral pentagon. Each circle's center is one of four vertices of the pentagon. The remaining vertex is determined by one of the intersection points of the first and the last circle of the chain.

== Examples ==
Simple				Collinear edges	Complex polygon	
Convex		Concave		Collinear edges	Complex polygon	
Regular pentagon (108° internal angles)	Adjacent right angles (60° 150° 90° 90° 150°)	Reflexed regular pentagon (36° 252° 36° 108° 108°)	Dodecagonal versatile (30° 210° 60° 90° 150°)	Degenerate into trapezium (120° 120° 60° 180° 60°)	Regular star pentagram (36°)	Intersecting (36° 108° −36° −36° 108°)
				Degenerate into triangle (≈28.07° 180° ≈75.96° ≈75.96° 180°)	Self-intersecting	Degenerate (edge-vertex overlap)

== Internal angles of a convex equilateral pentagon ==
Convex equilateral pentagon dissected into 3 triangles, which helps to calculate the value of angle δ as a function of α and β.

When a convex equilateral pentagon is dissected into triangles, two of them appear as isosceles (triangles in orange and blue) while the other one is more general (triangle in green). We assume that we are given the adjacent angles $\alpha$ and $\beta$.

According to the law of sines the length of the line dividing the green and blue triangles is:

$$a = 2\sin\left(\frac{\beta}{2}\right).$$

The square of the length of the line dividing the orange and green triangles is:

$$\begin{align}
b^2 & = 1 + a^2 - 2(1)(a)\cos\left(\alpha - \frac{\pi}{2} + \frac{\beta}{2} \right)\\
& = 1 + 4\sin^2\left(\frac{\beta}{2}\right)
- 4\sin\left(\frac{\beta}{2}\right)\sin\left(\alpha+\frac{\beta}{2}\right).\\
\end{align}$$

According to the law of cosines, the cosine of δ can be seen from the figure:

$$\cos(\delta) = \frac{1^2 + 1^2 - b^2}{2(1)(1)}\ .$$

Simplifying, δ is obtained as function of α and β:

$$\delta = \arccos\left[\cos(\alpha) + \cos(\beta) - \cos(\alpha + \beta) - \frac{1}{2} \right].$$

The remaining angles of the pentagon can be found geometrically: The remaining angles of the orange and blue triangles are readily found by noting that two angles of an isosceles triangle are equal while all three angles sum to 180°. Then $\epsilon, \gamma,$ and the two remaining angles of the green triangle can be found from four equations stating that the sum of the angles of the pentagon is 540°, the sum of the angles of the green triangle is 180°, the angle $\gamma$ is the sum of its three components, and the angle $\epsilon$ is the sum of its two components.

A cyclic pentagon is equiangular if and only if it has equal sides and thus is regular. Likewise, a tangential pentagon is equilateral if and only if it has equal angles and thus is regular.

== Tiling ==
Cairo pentagonal tiling by equilateral pentagons with two non-adjacent right angles

There are two infinite families of equilateral convex pentagons that tile the plane, one having two adjacent supplementary angles and the other having two non-adjacent supplementary angles; these families belong to monohedral type 1 and type 2 respectively, the latter family having two special cases that also fit types 4 and 8. Each family has one degree of freedom, and they intersect at the degenerate pentagon with one angle of 180°. Some of those pentagons can tile in more than one way, and there is one sporadic example of an equilateral pentagon that can tile the plane but does not belong to either of those two families; it belongs to type 7 and its angles are roughly 89°16', 144°32.5', 70°55', 135°22', and 99°54.5', no two supplementary.

== A two-dimensional mapping ==
All the equilateral pentagons plotted within the area delimited by the condition α ≥ β ≥ δ. Three regions for each of three types of pentagons are shown: stellated, concave and convex

Equilateral pentagons can intersect themselves either not at all, once, twice, or five times. The ones that don't intersect themselves are called simple, and they can be classified as either convex or concave. We here use the term "stellated" to refer to the ones that intersect themselves either twice or five times. We rule out, in this section, the equilateral pentagons that intersect themselves precisely once.

Given that we rule out the pentagons that intersect themselves once, we can plot the rest as a function of two variables in the two-dimensional plane. Each pair of values (α, β) maps to a single point of the plane and also maps to a single pentagon.

The periodicity of the values of α and β and the condition α ≥ β ≥ δ permit the size of the mapping to be limited. In the plane with coordinate axes α and β, the equation α = β is a line dividing the plane in two parts (south border shown in orange in the drawing). The equation δ = β as a curve divides the plane into different sections (north border shown in blue).

Both borders enclose a continuous region of the plane whose points map to unique equilateral pentagons. Points outside the region just map to repeated pentagons—that is, pentagons that when rotated or reflected can match others already described. Pentagons that map exactly onto those borders have a line of symmetry.

Inside the region of unique mappings there are three types of pentagons: stellated, concave and convex, separated by new borders.

=== Stellated ===
The stellated pentagons have sides intersected by others. A common example of this type of pentagon is the pentagram. A condition for a pentagon to be stellated, or self-intersecting, is to have 2α + β ≤ 180°. So, in the mapping, the line 2α + β = 180° (shown in orange at the north) is the border between the regions of stellated and non-stellated pentagons. Pentagons which map exactly to this border have a vertex touching another side.

=== Concave ===
The concave pentagons are non-stellated pentagons having at least one angle greater than 180°. The first angle which opens wider than 180° is γ, so the equation γ = 180° (border shown in green at right) is a curve which is the border of the regions of concave pentagons and others, called convex. Pentagons which map exactly to this border have at least two consecutive sides appearing as a double length side, which resembles a pentagon degenerated to a quadrilateral.

=== Convex ===
The convex pentagons have all of their five angles smaller than 180° and no sides intersecting others. A common example of this type of pentagon is the regular pentagon.
