= Majd al-Din Baghdadi =

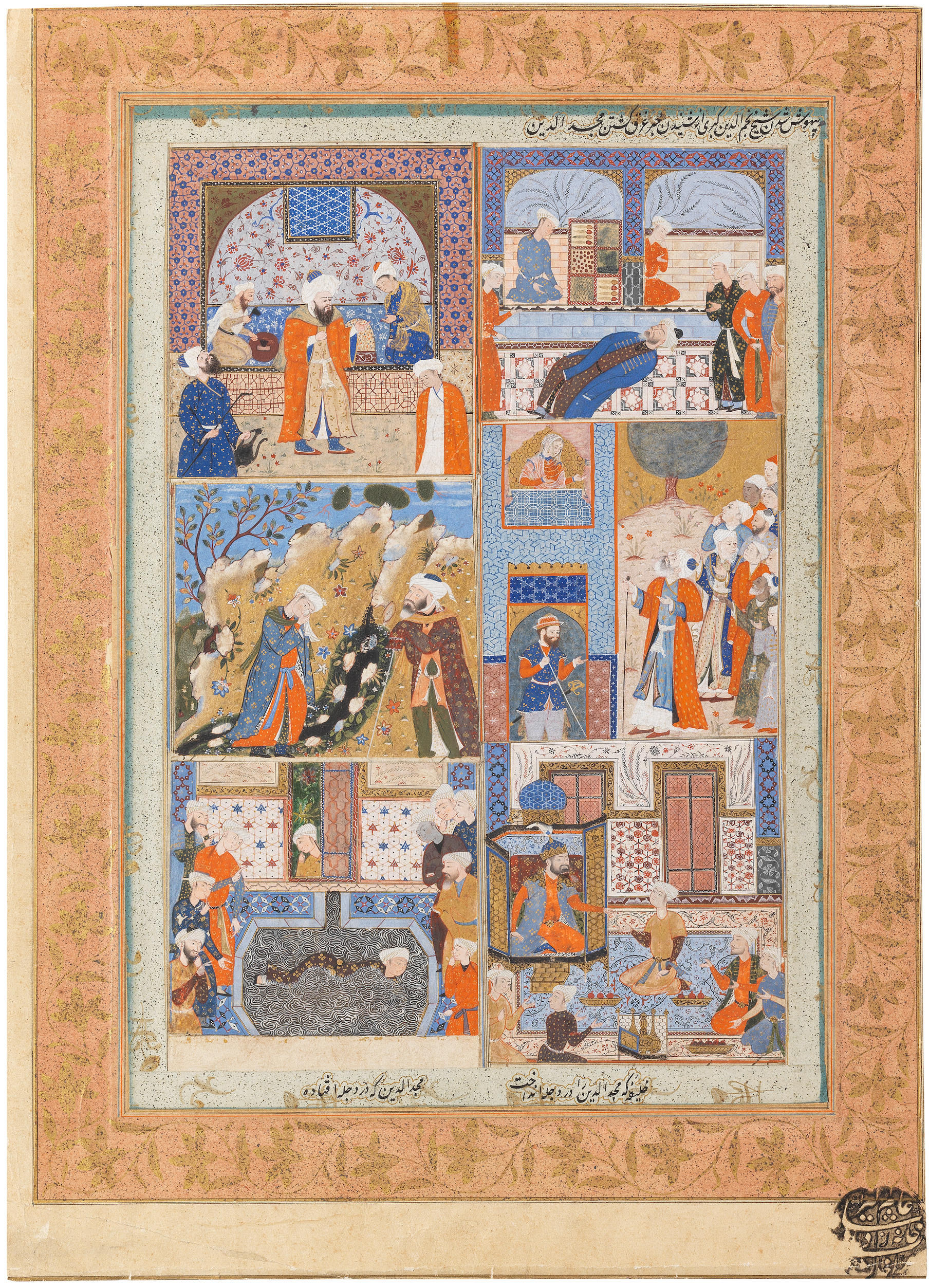
Persian miniature from an album page with six scenes from the life of Majd al-Din Baghdadi. Created in 16th-century Herat (now Afghanistan)

Abū Saʿīd Sharaf ibn al-Muʾayyad ibn Abī l-Fatḥ al-Baghdādī (1170–1219), best known as Majd al-Din Baghdadi (Persian: مجدالدین بغدادی), was an important Sufi shaykh ("master") of the Kubrawiya school of Sufism. Baghdadi's students included Najm al-Din Razi (died 1256) and Razi al-Din Ali Lala (died 1244). His most significant work was Tuḥfat al-barara fī l-masāʾil al-ʿashara ("The gift of the pious in ten questions"), written in Arabic. Baghdadi also wrote several Persian works, including Risāla fī l-safar ("Treatise on [spiritual] travel"), as well as poems and letters.

He was the older brother of Baha al-Din Baghdadi.
