= Penta-graphene =

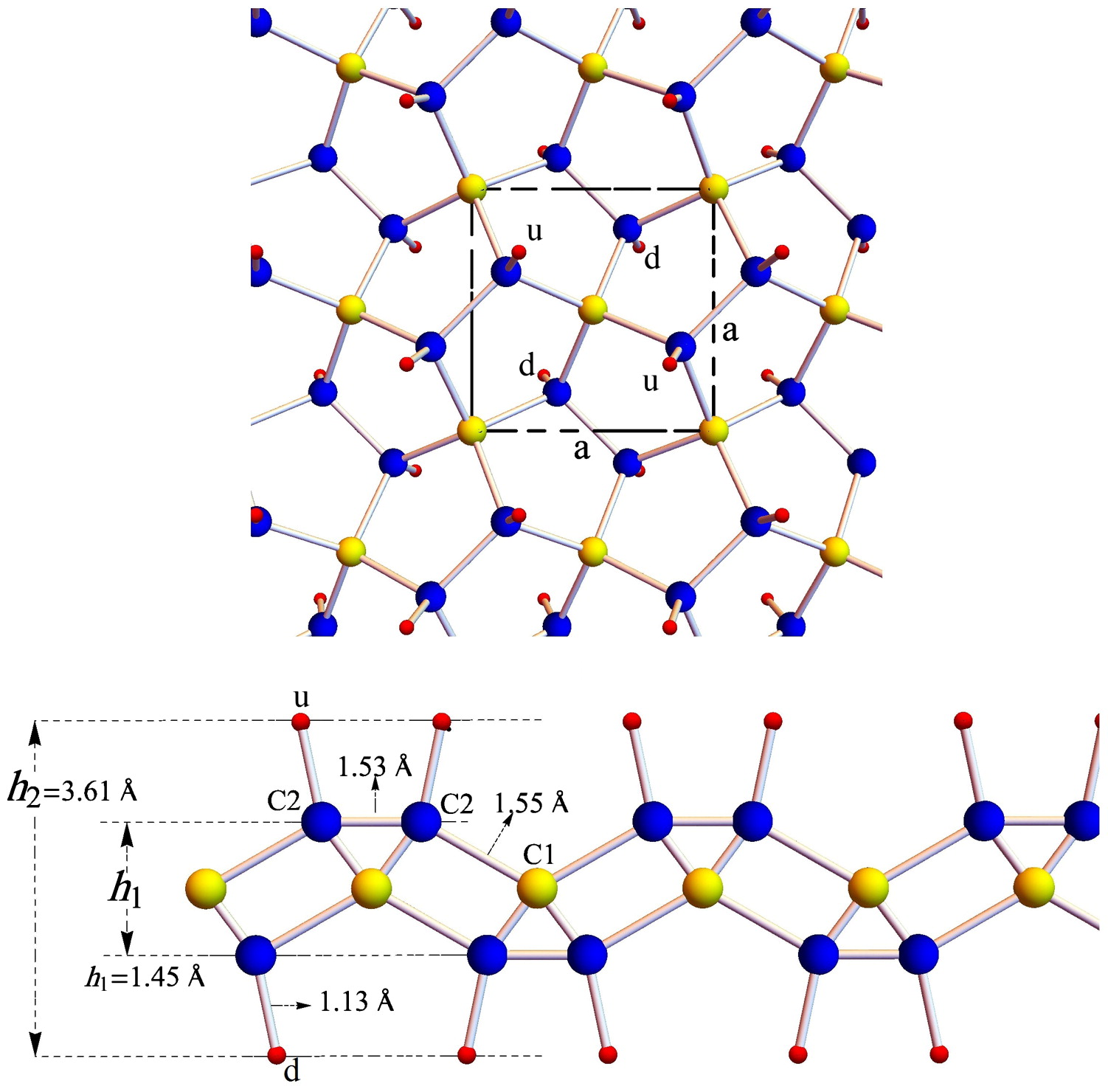
- Top view (top) and side view (bottom) of penta-graphane. Yellow and blue spheres show two types of carbon atoms, while red balls correspond to hydrogens.

Names
- Other names PG

Identifiers

Properties
Chemical formula	C_{n}
- Except where otherwise noted, data are given for materials in their standard state (at 25 °C [77 °F], 100 kPa). Infobox references

Penta-graphene is a hypothetical carbon allotrope composed entirely of carbon pentagons and resembling the Cairo pentagonal tiling. Penta-graphene was proposed in 2014 on the basis of analyses and simulations. Further calculations predicted that it is unstable in its pure form, but can be stabilized by hydrogenation. Due to its atomic configuration, penta-graphene has an unusually negative Poisson’s ratio and very high ideal strength believed to exceed that of a similar material, graphene.

Cairo pentagonal tiling

Penta-graphene contains both sp^{2} and sp^{3} hybridized carbon atoms. Contrary to graphene, which is a good conductor of electricity, penta-graphene is predicted to be an insulator with an indirect band gap of 4.1–4.3 eV. Its hydrogenated form is called penta-graphane. It has a diamond-like structure with sp^{3} and no sp^{2} bonds, and therefore a wider band gap (ca. 5.8 eV) than penta-graphene. Chiral penta-graphene nanotubes have also been studied as metastable allotropes of carbon.
