= Mirza Ghiyas Beg =

Mughal administrator (1544–1621)

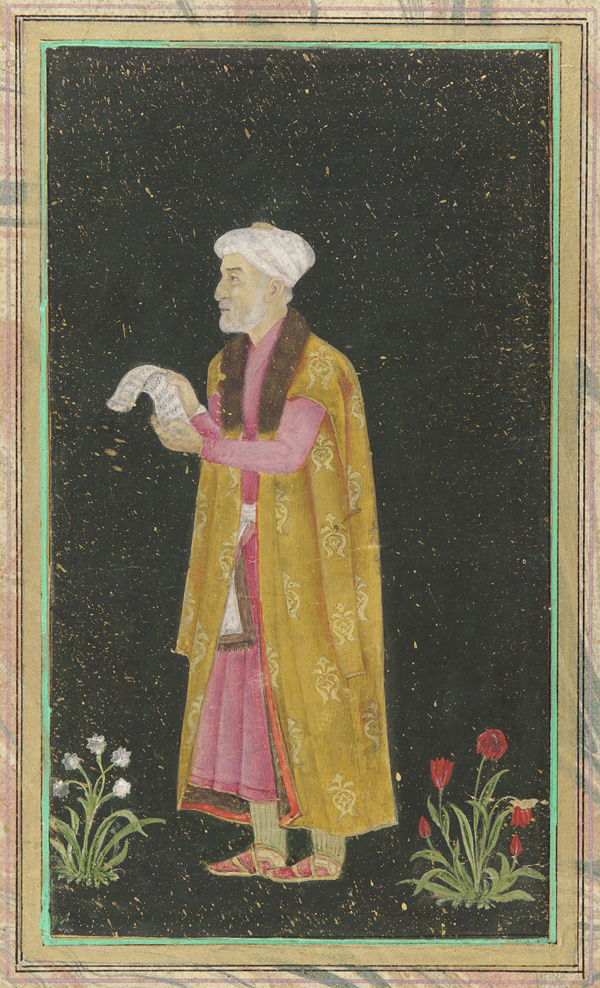
- An 18th-century portrait of Mirza Ghiyas Beg. Color and gold over gold-sprinkled black ground on paper.

Vakil of the Mughal Empire (Grand Vizier)
- In office 1611 – January 1621
- Monarch: Jahangir
- Preceded by: Asaf Khan Qazvini
- Succeeded by: Abu'l-Hasan Asaf Khan

Personal details
- Born: c. 1544 Tehran, Safavid Iran
- Died: January 1621 (aged 76–77) Kangra, Mughal Empire
- Spouse: Asmat Begam
- Relations: Khvajeh Mohammad-Sharif (father); Mohammad-Taher Wasli (brother); Ahmad Tehrani (uncle); Amin Razi (cousin); Jahangir (son-in-law)
- Children: Muhammad Sharif; Shapur Itiqad Khan; Abu'l-Hasan Asaf Khan; Manija Begum; Nur Jahan; Khadija Begum

Military service
- Allegiance: Mughal Empire
- Years of service: 1577–1621

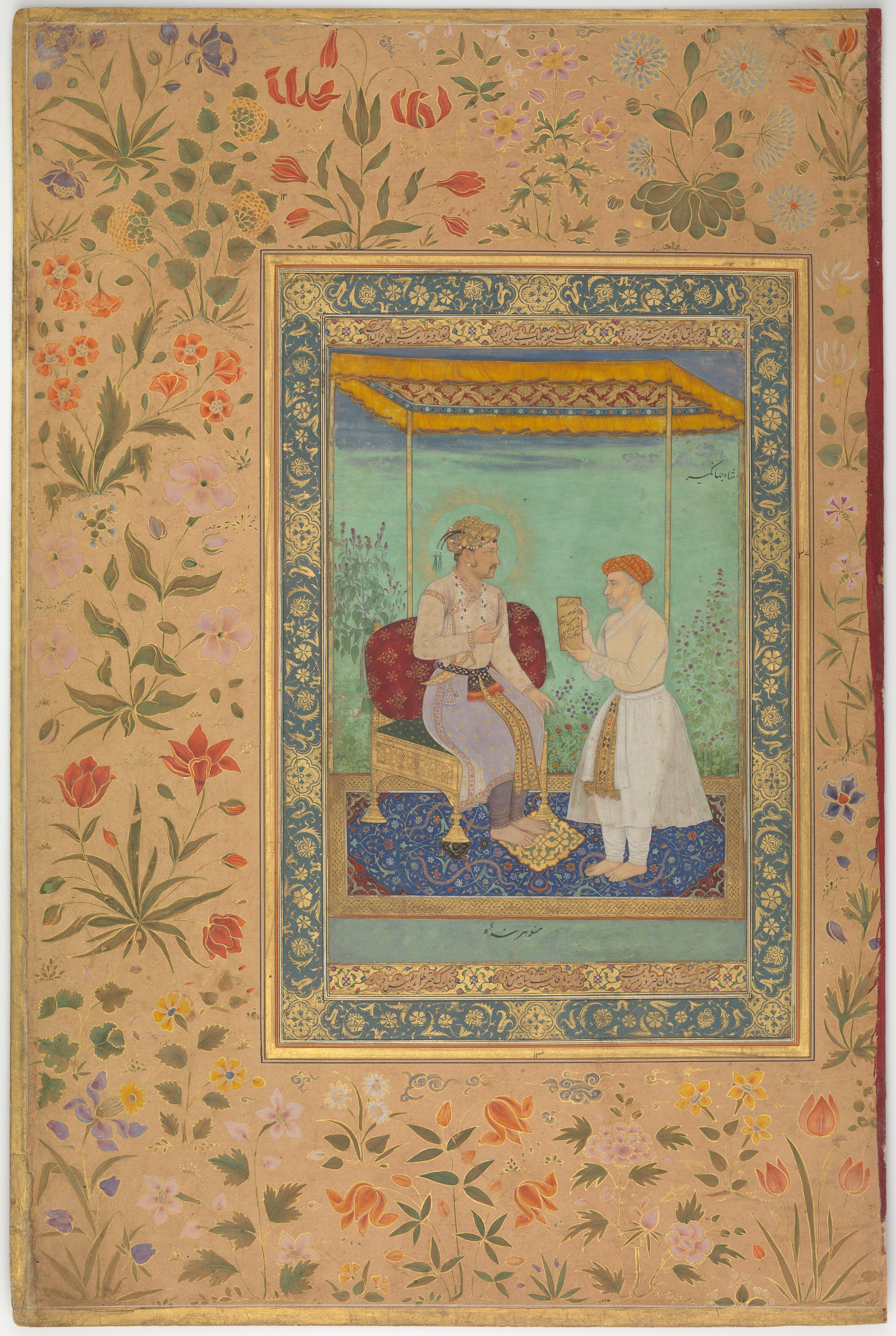
Emperor Jahangir and Mirza Ghiyas Beg

Mirza Ghiyas Beg (Persian: مرزا غياث بيگ; c. 1544 – January 1621), also known by his title I'timad-ud-Daulah (Persian: اعتماد الدوله), was an important official in the Mughal Empire, whose children included the generals, wives and mothers of the Mughal emperors.

Born in Tehran, Mirza Ghiyas Beg belonged to a family of poets and high officials. Nevertheless, his fortunes fell into disfavor after the death of his father in 1576. Along with his pregnant wife Ismat Begum, and his three children, they immigrated to India. There he was received by the Mughal emperor Akbar (r. 1556-1605), and was enrolled into his service. During the latter's reign, Mirza Ghiyas Beg was appointed treasurer for the province of Kabul.

His fortunes further increased during the reign of Akbar's son and successor Jahangir (r. 1605–1627), who in 1611 married his daughter Nur Jahan and appointed Mirza Ghiyas Beg as his prime minister. By 1615, Mirza Ghiyas Beg had risen to further prominence, when he was given the status of 6,000 men and was given a standard and drums, a prestige normally restricted for distinguished princes.

== Family ==
Mirza Ghiyas Beg was a native of Tehran, and was the youngest son of Khvajeh Mohammad-Sharif, a poet and vizier of Mohammad Khan Tekkelu and his son Tatar Soltan, who was the governor of the Safavid province of Khorasan. Mohammad-Sharif was later listed under the service of Shah Tahmasp I (r. 1524–1576), where he initially served as the vizier of Yazd, Abarkuh, and Biabanak for seven years. Thereafter he was appointed as the vizier of Isfahan, and died there in 1576. Ghiyas Beg's elder brother, Mohammad-Taher Wasli, was a learned man who composed poetry under the pen name of Wasli.

== Immigration to India ==
After the death of Ghiyas' father, his family fell on hard times. Hoping to improve his family's fortunes, Ghiyas Beg chose to relocate to India where the Emperor Akbar's court was said to be at the centre of the growing trade, industry and cultural scene. During their journey, the family was attacked by robbers who took from them whatever meager possessions they had.

Left with only two mules, Ghiyas Beg, his pregnant wife, and their three children (Mohammad-Sharif, Asaf Khan and a daughter) were forced to take turns riding on the backs of the animals for the rest of their journey. When the family arrived in Kandahar, Asmat Begum gave birth to their second daughter. The family was so impoverished, they feared they would be unable to take care of the newborn baby. Fortunately, the family was taken in by a caravan led by the merchant noble Malik Masud, who would later assist Ghiyas Beg in finding a job in the service of Emperor Akbar. Believing that the child had signaled a change in the family's fate, she was named Mihr-un-Nissa, meaning "sun among women". Ghiyas Beg was not the first member of his family to move to India—his cousin Asaf Khan Jafar Beg and the uncle of Asmat Begum, Mirza Ghiyasuddin Ali Asaf Khan, had been enrolled into the provincial assignments of Akbar.

== Service under the Mughal Empire ==
Mirza Ghiyas Beg was later appointed diwan (treasurer) for the province of Kabul. Due to his astute skills at conducting business he quickly rose through the ranks of the high administrative officials. For his excellent work he was awarded the title of ‘‘Itimad-ud-Daula‘‘ (‘Pillar of the State’) by the emperor. As a result of his work and promotions, Ghiyas Beg was able to ensure that Mehrunnisa (the future Nur Jahan) would have the best possible education. She became well versed in Arabic and Persian. She also became well versed in art, literature, music and dance.

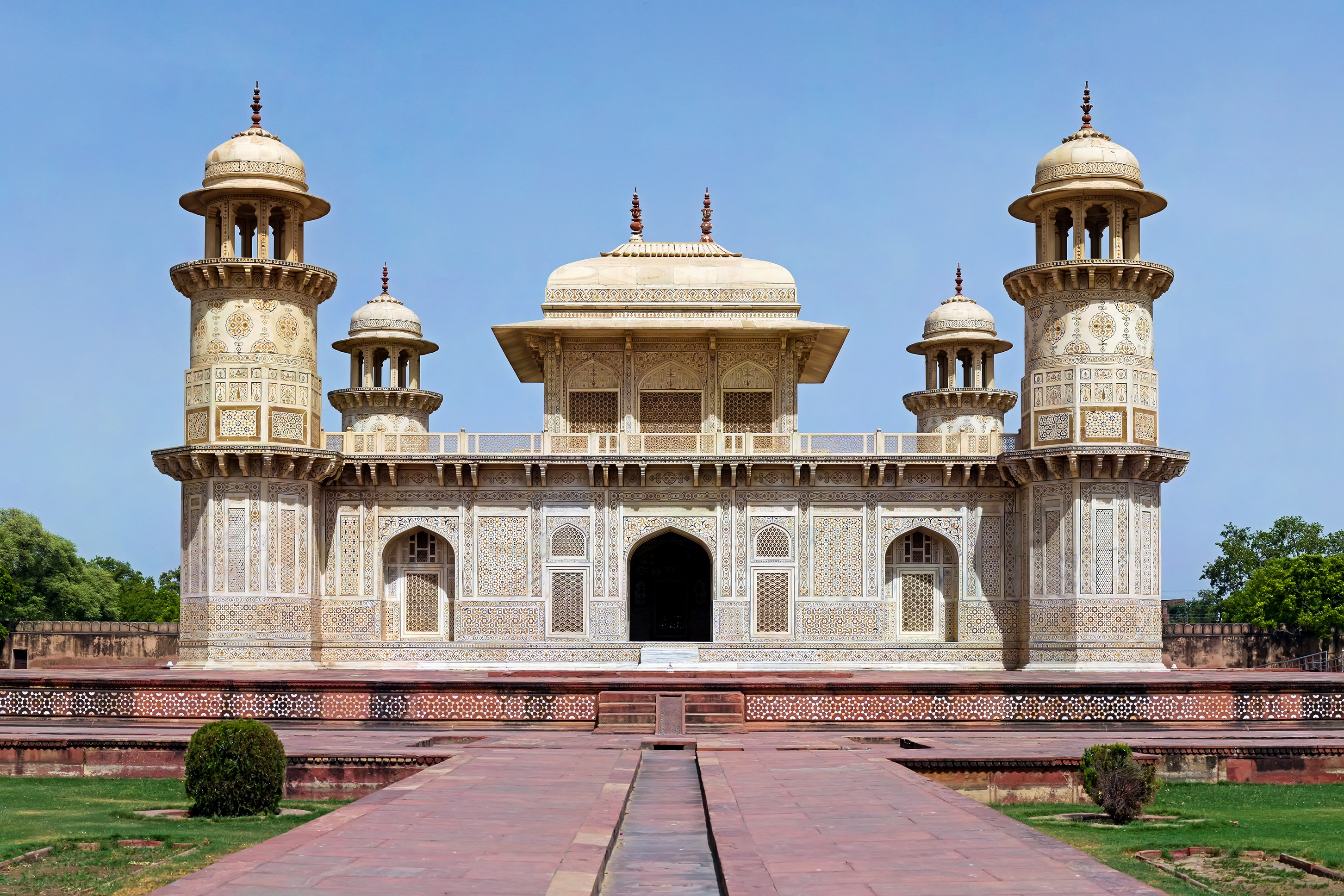
Mirza Ghiyas Beg's tomb in Agra

Ghiyas' daughter, Mihr-un-Nissa Begum (later Nur Jahan) married Akbar's son Jahangir in 1611, and his son Abdul Hasan Asaf Khan served as a general to Jahangir and as a grand vizier to his successor Shah Jahan.

Ghiyas was also the grandfather of Mumtaz Mahal (originally named Arjumand Banu, daughter of Abdul Hasan Asaf Khan), the wife of the emperor Shah Jahan, responsible for the building of the Taj Mahal. Jahangir was succeeded by his son Shah Jahan, and Abdul Hasan served as one of Shah Jahan's closest advisors. Shah Jahan married Abdul Hasan's daughter Arjumand Banu Begum, Mumtāz Mahal, who was the mother of his four sons, including his successor Aurangzeb. Shah Jahan built the Taj Mahal to serve as Mumtaz Mahal's tomb.

== Death and burial ==
Mirza Ghiyas Beg died near Kangra in 1621 while the Mughal camp was moving towards its summer residence in Kashmir. His body was carried back to Agra and buried on the left bank of the Yamuna river, where the Tomb of I'timad-ud-Daulah stand to this day.

== Popular culture ==
=== Films and television ===
- In the 2014 historical drama series Siyaasat aired on The EPIC Channel, he is portrayed by Pawan Chopra.
- In the 2023 ZEE5's web series Taj: Divided by Blood, he is portrayed by Pawan Chopra.

== Sources ==
- Banks Findly, Ellison (11 Feb 1993). Nur Jahan: Empress of Mughal India. Oxford, UK: Nur Jahan : Empress of Mughal India. ISBN 9780195074888.
- Gold, Claudia (2008). Queen, Empress, Concubine: Fifty Women Rulers from Cleopatra to Catherine the Great. London: Quercus. ISBN 978-1-84724-542-7.
- Keay, John (2000). India: A History. Grove Press, New York.
- Lal, Ruby (2018). The Astonishing Reign of Nur Jahan. New York: W.W. Norton & Company. ISBN 978-0-393-35767-7.
- Nath, Renuka (1990). Notable Mughal and Hindu women in the 16th and 17th centuries A.D. New Delhi: Inter-India Publ. ISBN 9788121002417.
- Pant, Chandra (1978). Nur Jahan and Her Family. Allahabad: Dandewal Publishing House.
- Shokoohy, Mehrdad (2001). "GĪĀṮ BEG, ʿEʿTEMĀD-AL-DAWLA". Encyclopaedia Iranica, Vol. X, Fasc. 6. pp. 594–595.
