= Itmad Ud Daulah =

Mughal monument in Agra, India

- Tomb of I'timād-ud-Daulah, Baby Taj, Bacha Taj
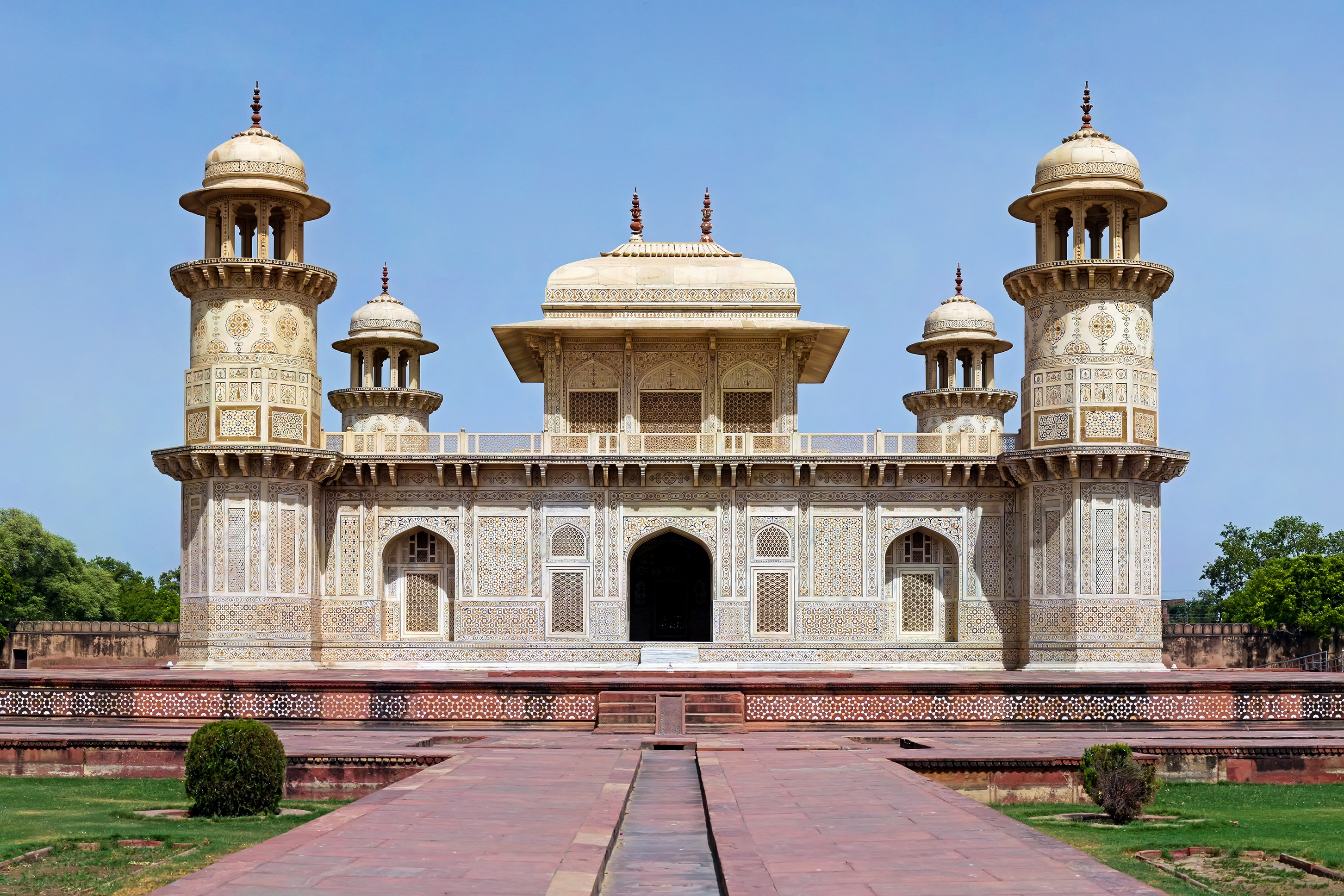
- The tomb of I'timād-ud-Daulah
- Interactive map of Itmad Ud Daulah
- Location: Agra, Uttar Pradesh, India
- Coordinates: 27°11′33″N 78°01′55″E
- Type: Mausoleum
- Beginning date: 1622
- Completion date: 1628; 398 years ago
- Dedicated to: I'timad-ud-Daulah

Itmad Ud Daulah (also known as the Tomb of I'timād-ud-Daulah, Bacha Taj, or the Baby Taj) is a Mughal mausoleum in Agra, Uttar Pradesh, India. Built between 1622 and 1628, it was commissioned by the Mughal empress Nur Jahan for her father, Mirza Ghiyas Beg, who had been given the title I'timād-ud-Daulah (“Pillar of the State”) by Emperor Jahangir. Ghiyas Beg was the grandfather of Mumtaz Mahal, the Empress consort of Shah Jahan who later commissioned the Taj Mahal for her.

The tomb is regarded as an important transitional work in Mughal architecture. It marks a development from the red sandstone and marble decoration of monuments such as Humayun's Tomb and Akbar's tomb towards the white marble and pietra dura inlay later exemplified by the Taj Mahal. The white-marble mausoleum stands at the centre of a charbagh (a garden divided into four sections by paths or waterways) and has a square plan with octagonal towers at each corner. Unlike many Mughal mausoleums, it has no central dome, and has elaborate jali screens, pietra dura inlay and polychrome decoration. The decoration is sometimes referred to as a forerunner of that of the Taj Mahal. It has been described as a “jewel box” for its intricate decoration.

The mausoleum forms part of a complex of gardens and subsidiary buildings. The site is protected and conserved by the Archaeological Survey of India (ASI).

== History ==
Itmad Ud Daulah, which contains the tombs of Mirza Ghiyas Beg and his wife Ismat Begum, was constructed on the eastern bank of the Yamuna river in a garden that had originally belonged to Ghiyas Beg. Ghiyas Beg was a Persian nobleman who served the Mughal emperors Akbar and Jahangir. He was the father of Nur Jahan and grandfather of Mumtaz Mahal, the Empress consort of Shah Jahan, who commissioned the Taj Mahal for her. Following the marriage of his daughter Nur Jahan to Jahangir in 1611, Ghiyas Beg became vazir (prime minister) and lord treasurer, and was given the title I'timad-Ud-Daulah ("Pillar of the State"). He died at Agra in 1622, a few months after the death of his wife. Nur Jahan then commissioned the mausoleum for her parents, and it was built between 1622 and 1628. Ghiyas Beg and Ismat Begum occupy the central chamber, while Ghiyas Beg's brother, sister, and other members of the family are interred in the four corner chambers. Nur Jahan's own tomb and that of Jahangir are at Lahore.

During the nineteenth century, under British rule, the original Mughal-style planting of the charbagh was replaced by English-style lawns. The monument was documented by Indian and British artists and photographers during the century, including Sita Ram in 1814–15 and Eugene Clutterbuck Impey in the early 1860s. By the early twentieth century the buildings had undergone restoration. The interior paintings were partially restored in 1904–05, during the viceroyalty of Lord Curzon, and by 1906–07 the Archaeological Survey of India was carrying out restoration work on the garden's water channels and tanks; however, the garden's tanks and watercourses remained dry. In 1913, Constance Villiers-Stuart called for the restoration of the historic garden and its water system. During the 2010s, the Archaeological Survey of India, in collaboration with the World Monuments Fund, undertook a four-year project to restore the historic character of the charbagh. Areas of English-style lawn were replanted, an integrated water-treatment system was installed for the garden's water features, and the riverside façade was dredged to reveal previously obscured rooms and decorative work.

Itmad Ud Daulah is a centrally protected monument maintained by the Archaeological Survey of India (ASI). It is open to visitors throughout the year and is one of the five ticketed monuments in Agra covered by the Agra Development Authority's pathkar (toll) scheme, under which the toll paid by foreign visitors at one participating monument is valid at the others for the remainder of the same day. During the 2023–24 financial year, the tomb received 84,326 foreign visitors, making it the seventh most visited centrally protected ticketed monument in India by foreign tourists.

== Architecture ==
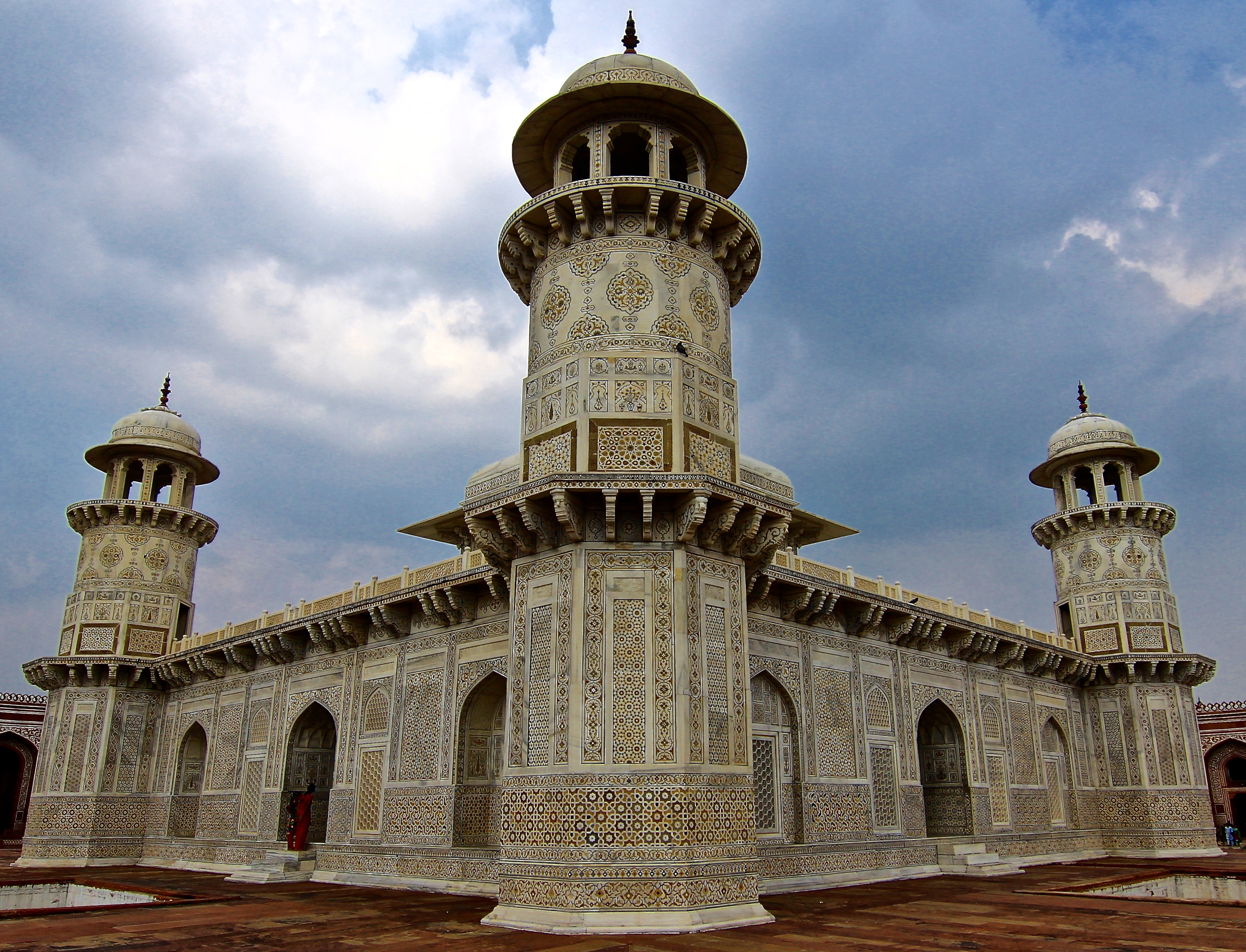
Diagonal view of the mausoleum

Itmad Ud Daulah is an example of a Mughal platform tomb, a form popular during Jahangir's reign; it does not have the large central dome characteristic of many later Mughal mausoleums. The tomb itself is considered the first Mughal structure in India built entirely of white marble. It marks a transitional phase in Mughal architecture from the red sandstone and marble decoration of the monuments of Akbar's era, such as Humayun's Tomb and Akbar's tomb, to the white marble and pietra dura inlay exemplified by the Taj Mahal of Shah Jahan. Several of its architectural and decorative features anticipate those later used in the Taj Mahal.

=== Garden and complex ===
The mausoleum stands on the eastern bank of the Yamuna river at the centre of a charbagh (a quadrilateral garden) enclosed by perimeter walls and subsidiary buildings. The principal entrance is through the eastern gateway, with ornamental gateways on the northern and southern sides. To the west, a pleasure pavilion faces the river. The gateways and pavilion are constructed of red sandstone with white-marble inlay.

The garden is divided into four quadrants by raised, stone-paved walkways with water channels along their centres. The layout symbolically evokes the four Rivers of Paradise, with the mausoleum at the centre of the garden. Four rectangular pools with fountains were set into the raised platform on which the mausoleum stands.

=== Mausoleum ===
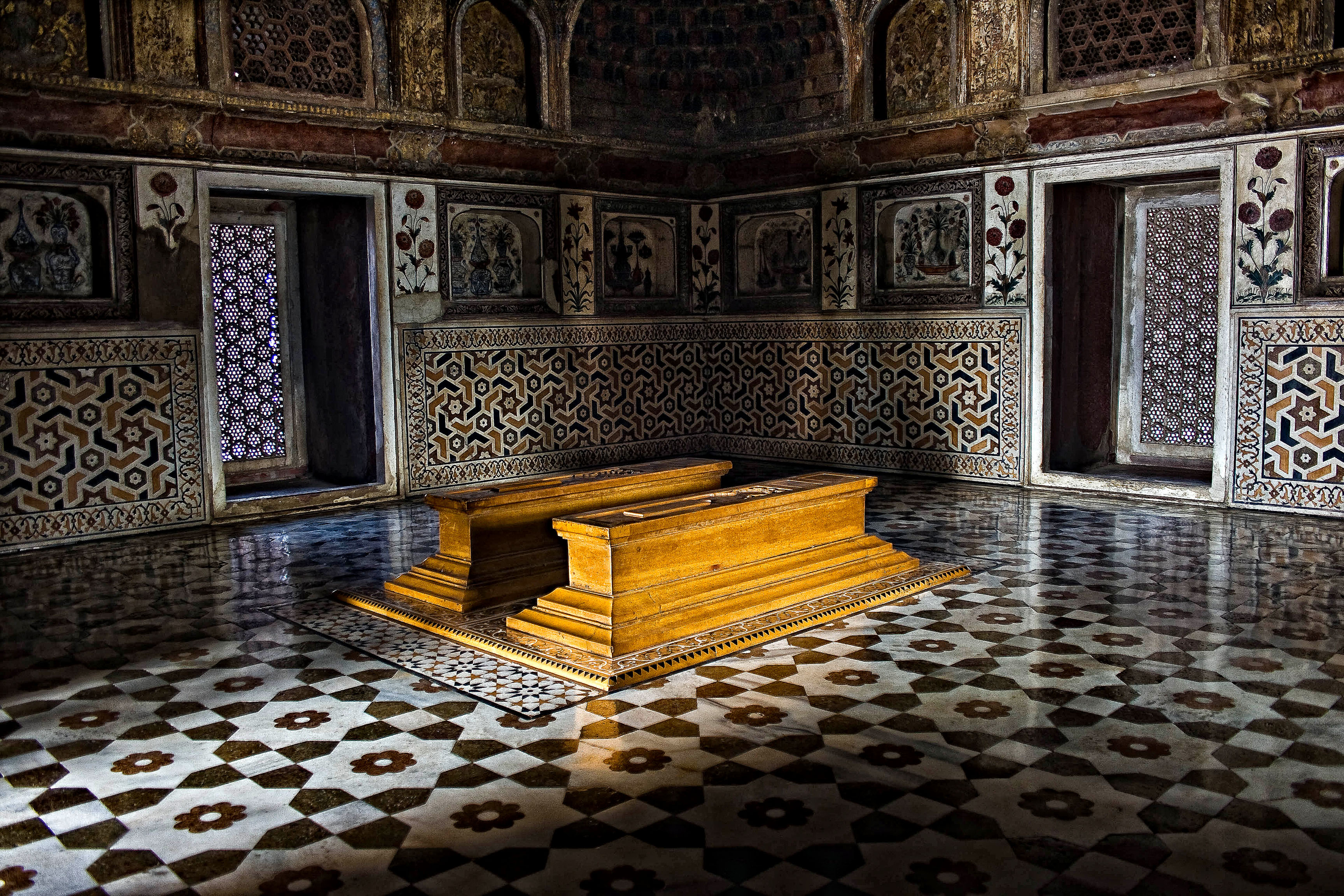
Cenotaphs and the interior of the tomb of Itimad-ud-Daulah

The white-marble mausoleum is square in plan, with octagonal towers about 13 metres (43 ft) tall at each corner, and stands on a red sandstone plinth at the centre of the garden. Each facade has three four-centred arches (broad, low pointed arches), with the central arch providing the entrance and the two outer arches closed by jalis. A projecting chhajja runs along each side, topped by a pierced jali parapet.

The roof is formed by a square baradari with an ogee-shaped roof. The four corner towers each carry a small domed pavilion decorated with padmakosha (lotus petals) and topped by kalasha (finials). Both the plinth and the roof level are edged by parapets — sandstone below and marble above — finished with lattice work. The plinth has a star-shaped inlay.

Inside, the plan centres on a square hall housing the cenotaphs of Mirza Ghiyas Beg and Ismat Begum. This central space is surrounded by four oblong side rooms and four square corner rooms, all linked by internal doorways. The two principal cenotaphs stand in the middle of the hall, while the corner chambers contain the tombstones of other relatives of Nur Jahan.

=== Decoration ===
Lattice-work patterns

The walls are of white Makrana marble from Rajasthan, decorated with semi-precious stones including carnelian, jasper, lapis lazuli, onyx and topaz. The designs include cypress trees, wine vessels, fruit and vases containing bouquets. Light enters the interior through jali screens of intricately carved white marble.

The tomb has intricate polychrome ornamentation, which has led to it being described as a “jewel box”. Floral and stylized arabesques, geometrical designs, opus sectile mosaic and pietra dura inlay are used throughout the exterior. Iranian motifs include wine vessels, cypress, honeysuckle and guldasta (flower bouquets). Some compositions were inspired by the plant studies of Ustad Mansur, the painter of flora and fauna during Jahangir's reign. Decoration also includes incised and relief carving, stucco and interior painting.

Passages from the Quran, including Surah Fatah and Surah Muzammil, are inscribed in Thuluth script across all four façades of the mausoleum.

== Gallery ==
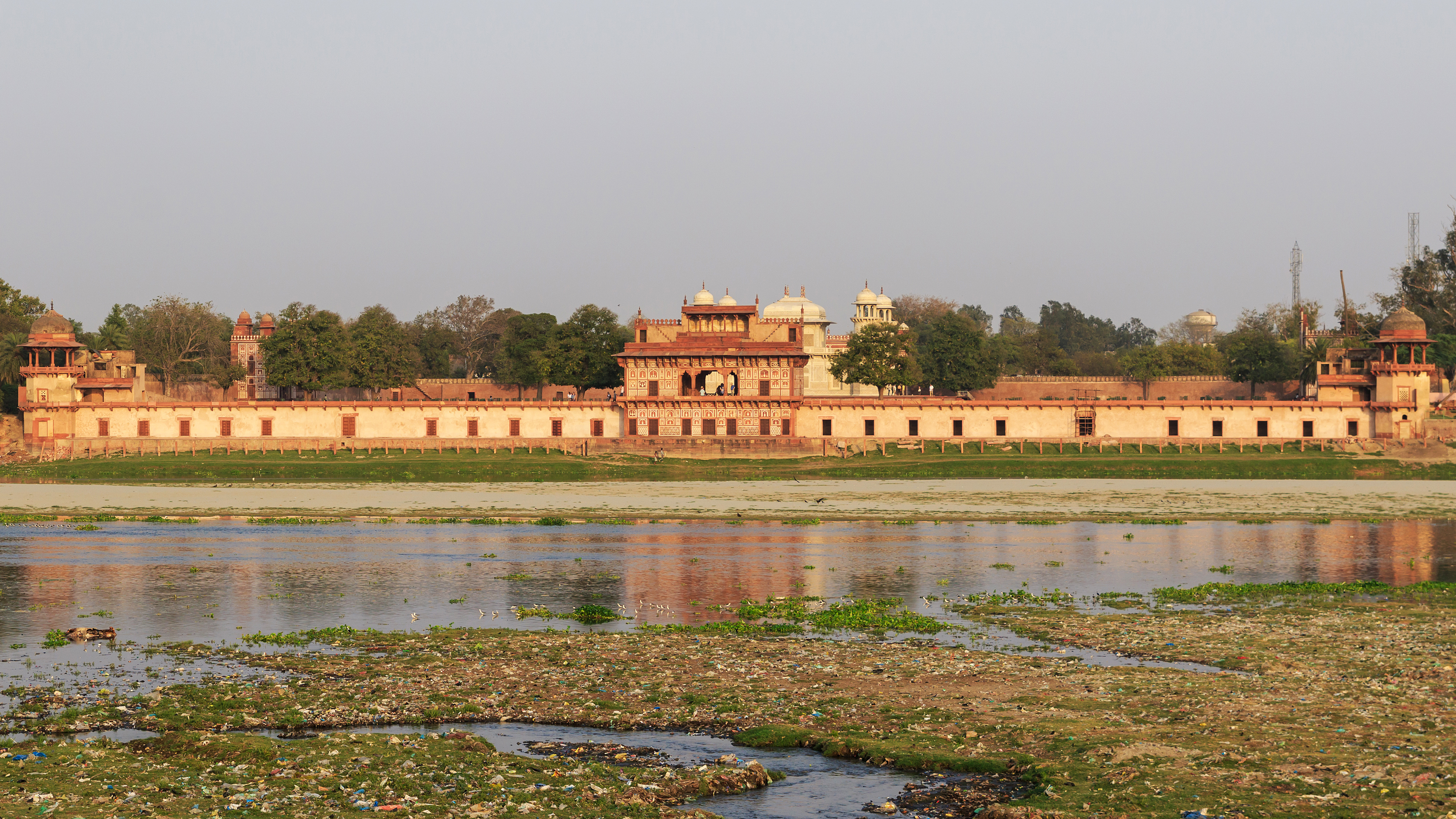
General view from the river

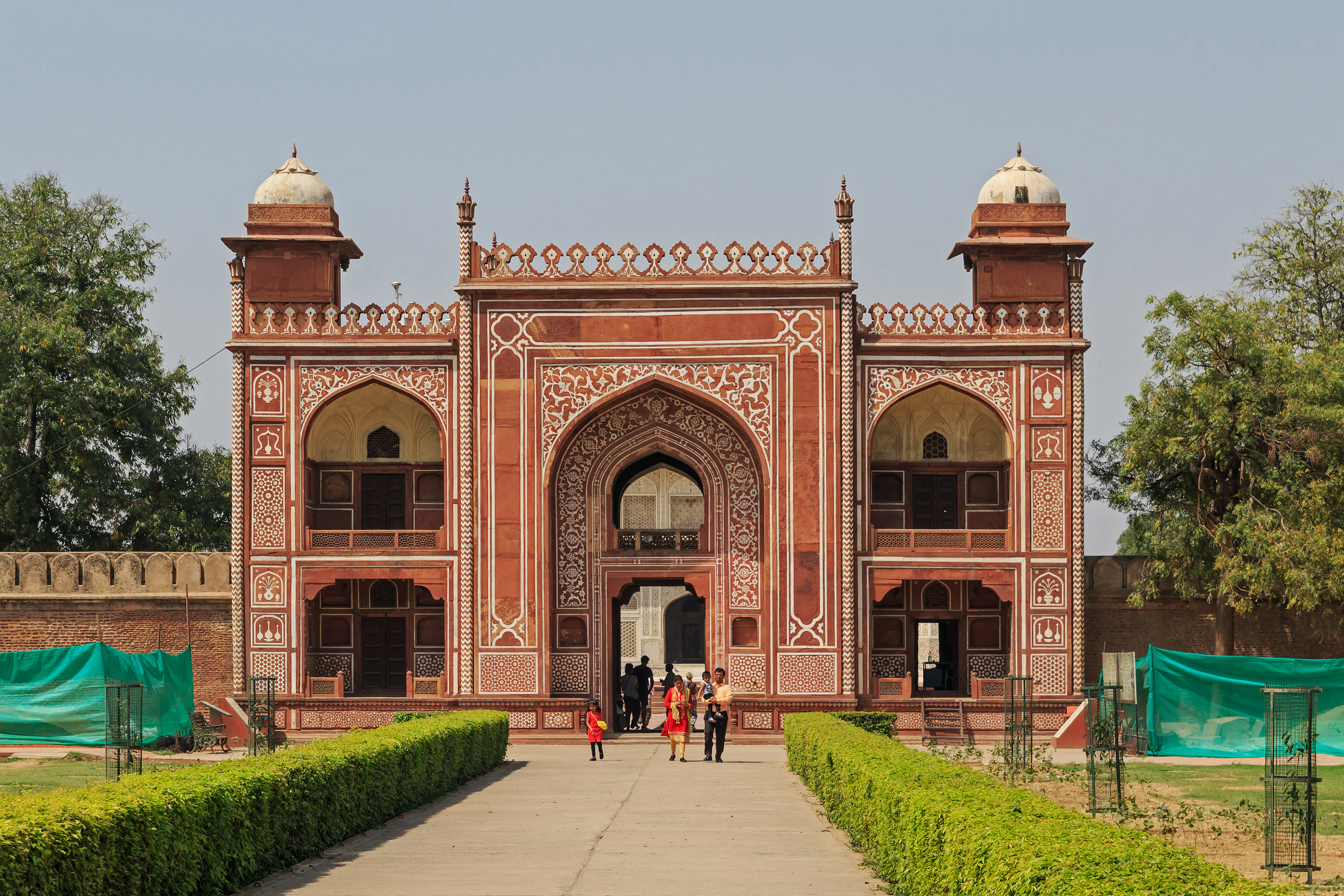
Entrance gate

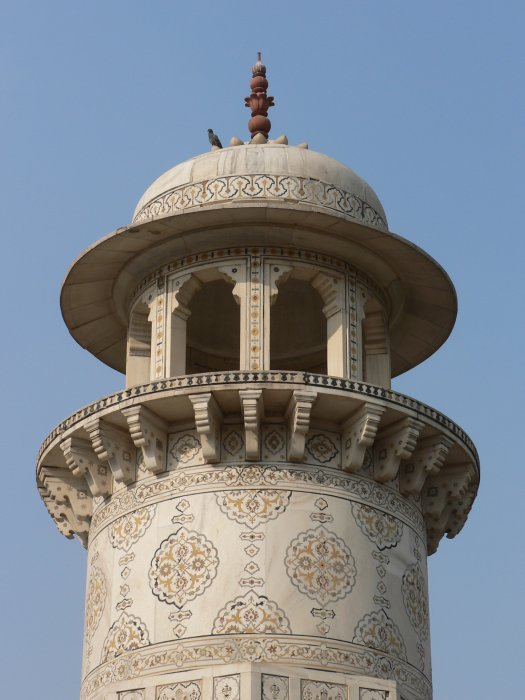
Domed top of a minaret

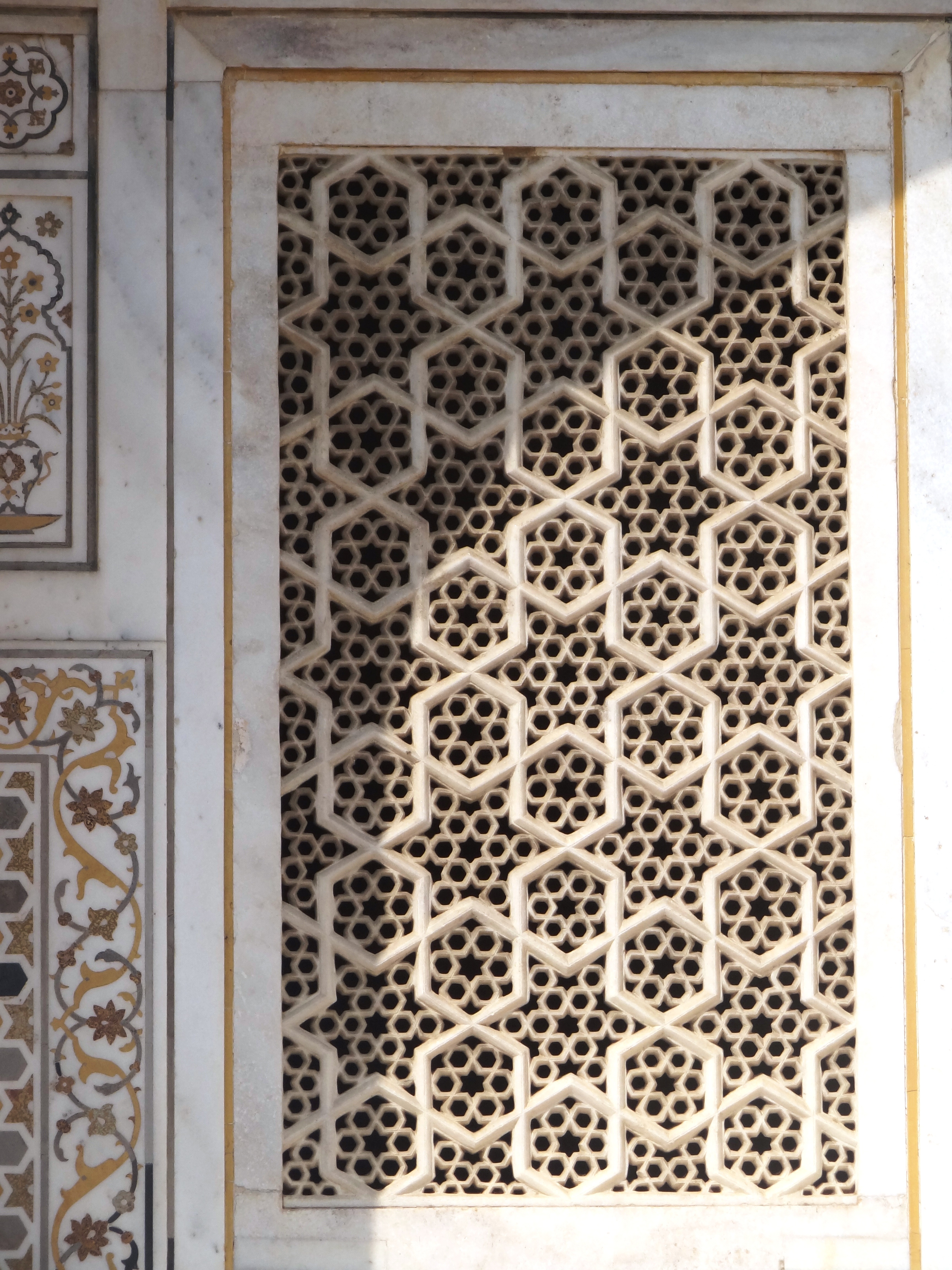
Jali pierced stone screen

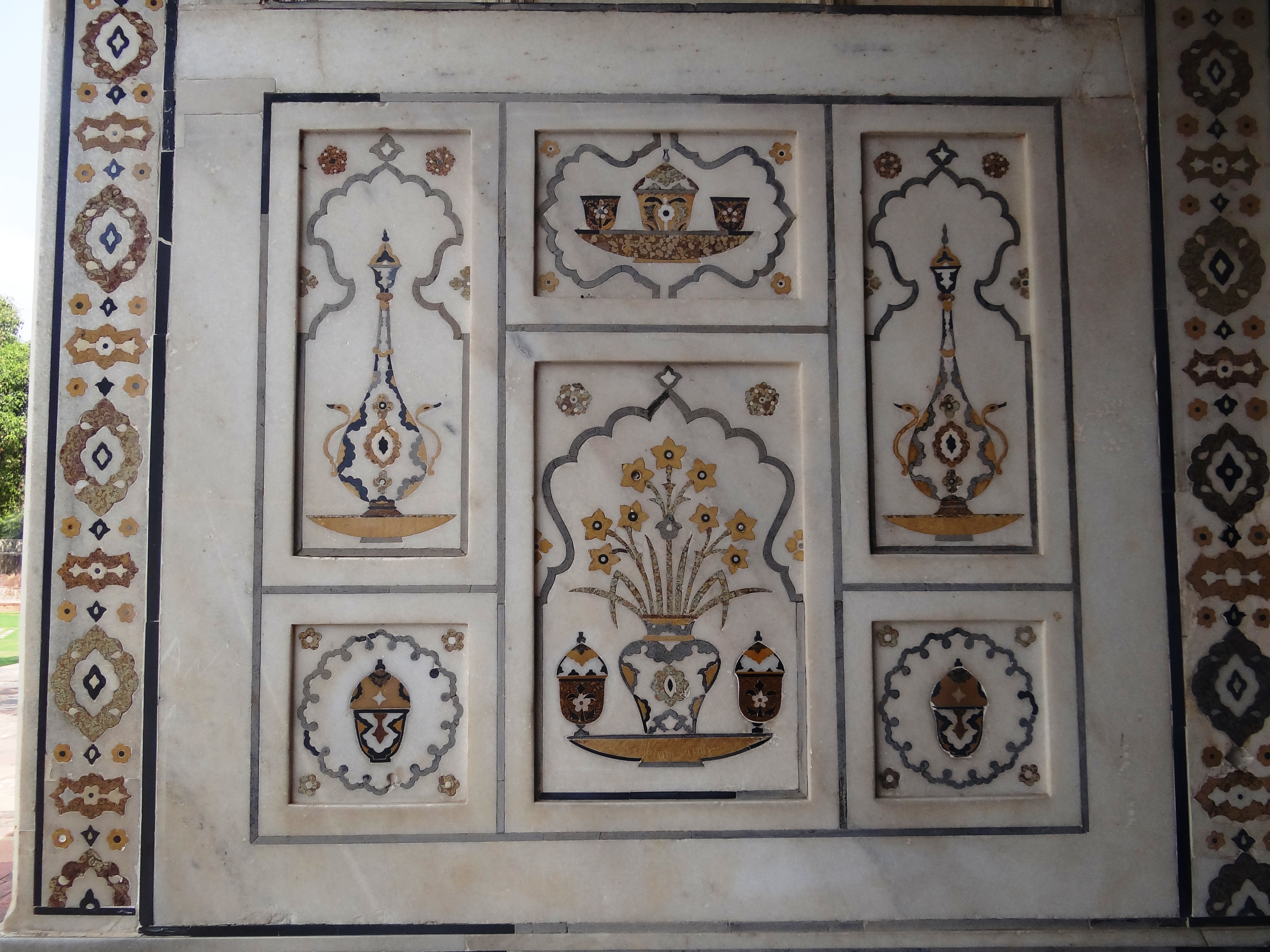
Pietra dura inlay

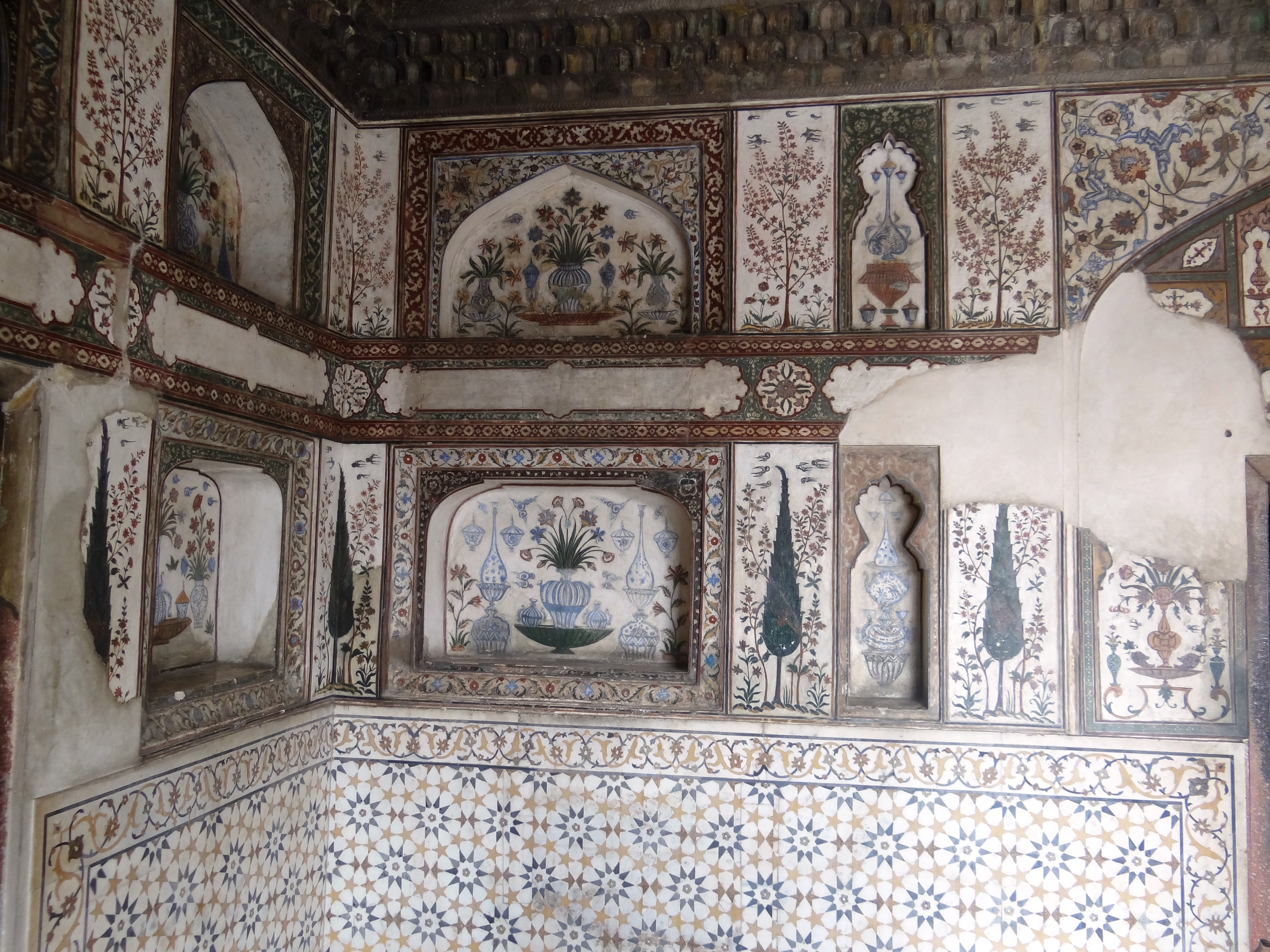
Interior decoration

== See also ==
- Tomb of Nur Jahan
- Indo-Islamic architecture
- Tomb of Jahangir
- Bibi Ka Maqbara
- Bahmani Tombs
- Tughluq tombs
