= Carl Hermann Ethé =

German orientalist

Carl Hermann Ethé or Hermann Ethé (1844–1917) was a German orientalist best known for his catalogues of Islamic manuscripts and his studies and German translations of Persian poetry.

He occupied the Professorship of German and Oriental Languages at the University College of Wales in Aberystwyth until the start of the First World War. He married British national Harriet Dora Phillips in 1899. Harriet subsequently lost her British citizenship and they both became targets of Germanophobia during this period as they were both run out of town. The University College refused to sever ties with him, but under the mounting public pressure from the general public against his employer, Ethé agreed to retire from his chair.

Among his translations was the first portion of Qazwini's cosmography, The Wonders of Creation (German: Kazwînis Kosmographie: Die Wunder der Schöpfung), published 1868.
