= Kalantar (title) =

Mayor in charge of a town in Iran

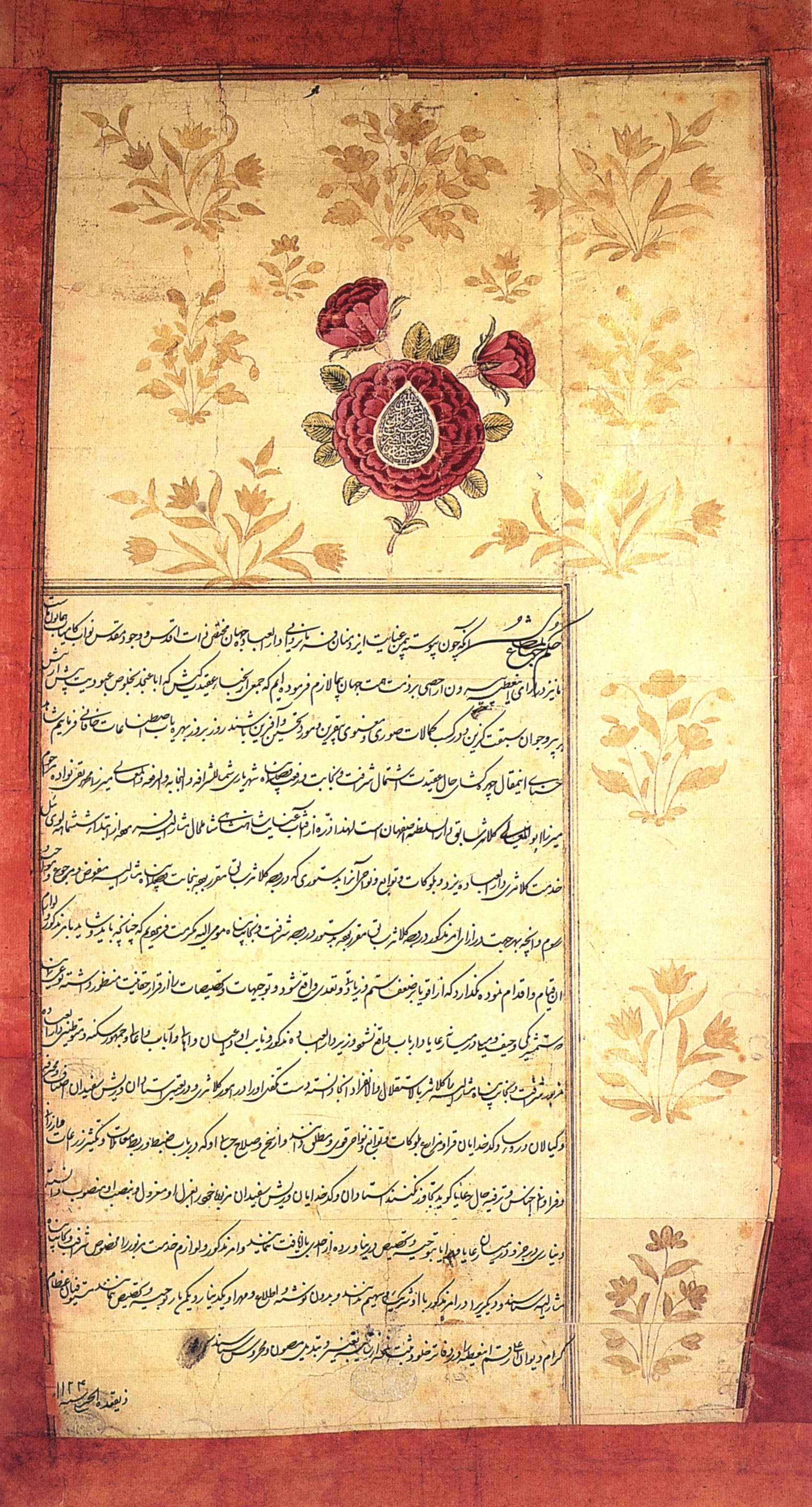
Farman (decree) by the Safavid shah Soltan Hoseyn appointing Mirza Mohammad Taqi as kalantar of Yazd, dated 1712

Kalantar (Persian: کلانتر) was a term which referred to the mayor in charge of a town in Iran. By the end of the 19th century, other authorities who represented new systems of governance had largely replaced the kalantar's position. Members of Bakhtiari and Qashqai tribes still use the term to refer to the leaders of their respective tribal divisions.

In Safavid Iran, the kalantar of the Armenian community in New Julfa was a significant and influential figure. Usually of Armenian stock, his duties were comparable to those of a kalantar in other towns or districts. In the 17th and 18th centuries, Safavid Georgia also had a well-known official called the kalantar, whose duties appear to have broadly matched those of the kalantar in towns of mainland Iran.

The word is related to Persian kalān, which means "big, great".

== Sources ==
- Floor, Willem (2010). "Kalāntar". In Yarshater, Ehsan (ed.). Encyclopædia Iranica. Vol. XV/4: Kafir Kala–Ḵamsa of Jamāli. London and New York: Routledge & Kegan Paul. pp. 366–367. ISBN 978-1-934283-26-4.
- Lambton, A.K.S. (1978). "Kalāntar". In van Donzel, E.; Lewis, B.; Pellat, Ch. & Bosworth, C. E. (eds.). The Encyclopaedia of Islam, Second Edition. Volume IV: Iran–Kha. Leiden: E. J. Brill. OCLC 758278456.
- Chardonnet, Sylvain (March 2025). "Le passage de Mehmet Reza beg, kalantar d'Erevan et ambassadeur de Perse, à Moulins et en Bourbonnais (janvier 1715)". Études Bourbonnaises (in French). 381. Moulins: Société bourbonnaise des études locales: 161–185. ISSN 0980-7225.
