= Haft eqlim =

The Haft eqlim (lit. 'Seven climes') is a Persian geographical and biographical encyclopedia, composed by Amin Razi in 1594. It is available in several manuscripts, but the 1961 version in Tehran by Javad Fazel is the sole complete one.

== Sources ==
- Memon, M. U. (2020). "Amīn Aḥmad Rāzī". Encyclopaedia Iranica Online. Brill. doi:10.1163/2330-4804_EIRO_COM_5303.
- Sharma, Sunil (2021). "Local and Transregional Places in the Works of Safavid Men of Letterse". In Melville, Charles (ed.). Safavid Persia in the Age of Empires, the Idea of Iran Vol. 10. Bloomsbury Publishing. pp. 309–330. ISBN 978-0755633777.
