= Aurangzeb =

Mughal emperor from 1658 to 1707

Alamgir I
- Al-Mukarram (Note: English: The Honourable, Generous); Al-Sultan al-Azam; Amir al-Mu'minin (Note: English: Commander of the Faithful); Shahenshah-e-Sultanat Al-Hindiyyah (Emperor of the Sultanate of India)
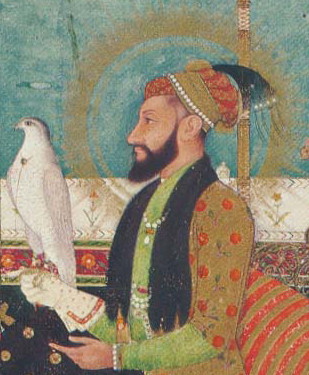
- Darbar of Aurangzeb by Bichitr, c. 1660

Mughal Emperor
- Reign: 29 May 1658 – 3 March 1707
- Coronation: 31 July 1658 (Note: A second coronation was held on 15 June 1659 in Red Fort); Sheesh Mahal
- Predecessor: Shah Jahan
- Successor: Azam Shah
- Grand Viziers: See list: Fazil Khan (1658–1663); Jafar Khan (1663–1670); Asad Khan (1676–1707)
Other governmental responsibilities
Viceroy of the Deccan (Note: The unified province of Deccan included the governorates of Khandesh, Bijapur, Berar, Aurangabad, Golconda and Bidar)
Reign	November 1653 – 5 February 1658
Emperor	Shah Jahan
Predecessor	Shaista Khan
Reign	14 July 1636 – 28 May 1644
Emperor	Shah Jahan
Predecessor	Position established
Successor	Khan-i-Dauran
Subahdar of Thatta
Reign	November 1648 – 14 July 1652
Emperor	Shah Jahan
Predecessor	Mughal Khan
Successor	Sardar Khan Shahjahani
Naib Subahdar	Mughal Khan; Zafar Khan
Subahdar of Multan
Reign	March 1648 – 14 July 1652
Emperor	Shah Jahan
Predecessor	Saeed Khan Bahadur
Successor	Bahadur Khan Rohilla
Subahdar of Balkh
Reign	21 January – 1 October 1647
Emperor	Shah Jahan
Predecessor	Murad Bakhsh
Successor	Position abolished
Subahdar of Badakhshan
Reign	21 January – 1 October 1647
Emperor	Shah Jahan
Predecessor	Murad Bakhsh
Successor	Position abolished
Subahdar of Gujarat
Reign	16 February 1645 – January 1647
Emperor	Shah Jahan
Predecessor	Mirza Isa Tarkhan
Successor	Shaista Khan
- Born: Muhi al-Din Muhammad; 3 November 1618; Dahod, Gujarat Subah, Mughal Empire
- Died: 3 March 1707 (aged 88); Bhingar, Aurangabad Subah, Mughal Empire
- Burial: 6 March 1707; Tomb of Aurangzeb, Khuldabad, Maharashtra, India
- Spouse: Dilras Banu Begum (m. 1637; died 1657); Nawab Bai (m. 1638; died 1691); Aurangabadi Mahal (died 1688); Udaipuri Mahal
- Issue Detail: Zeb-un-Nissa; Muhammad Sultan; Zinat-un-Nissa Begum; Bahadur Shah I; Badr-un-Nissa Begum; Zubdat-un-Nissa Begum; Azam Shah; Muhammad Akbar; Mihr-un-Nissa Begum; Muhammad Kam Bakhsh
Names
- Muhi al-Din Muhammad (محی الدین محمد)
Era name and dates
- Alamgir (عالمگیر): 31 July 1658 – 3 March 1707
Regnal name
- Abu al-Muzaffar Muhi al-Din Muhammad Bahadur Alamgir Aurangzeb Badshah al-Ghazi (ابوالمظفر محی الدین محمد بہادر عالمگیر اورنگزیب بادشاه الغازی)
Posthumous name
- Khuld-Makani (lit. 'One whose abode is in Paradise')
- House: Mughal
- Dynasty: Timurid
- Father: Shah Jahan
- Mother: Mumtaz Mahal
- Religion: Sunni Islam (Note: School of Thought: Hanafi Sufi order: Naqshbandi)
- Imperial Seal
- Military career
- Allegiance: Mughal Empire
- Branch: Mughal Army
- Commands: See list: Red Fort, Delhi; Deogiri Fort, Aurangabad; Kalan Kot, Thatta; Multan Fort, Multan; Bala Hisar Fort, Balkh; Yamchun Fort, Fayzabad; Bhadra Fort, Ahmedabad
- Conflicts: See list: Orchha (1635); Mughal–Bijapur War; Bidar (1636); Mughal–Portuguese War; Daman (1638–1639); Mughal–Portuguese War (1692–1693); Bassein (1693); Balkh (1647); Mughal–Safavid War; First Kandahar (1649); Second Kandahar (1652); Deccan War; Ahmednagar (1656); Satara (1699–1700); Panhala (1701); War of Succession; Dharmat (1658); Samugarh (1658); Khajwa (1659); Golconda (1687); Mughal–Rajput War; Rathore rebellion; First Jodhpur (1701); Second Jodhpur (1706); Anandpur (1704); Wagingera (1705)

Alamgir I (Note: Persian pronunciation: [ʔɑː.ˈlam.ˈɡiːɾ] lit. 'Conqueror of the World', which is derived from his title, Abu al-Muzaffar Muhi al-Din Muhammad Bahadur Alamgir Aurangzeb Badshah al-Ghazi.) (Muhi al-Din Muhammad; 3 November 1618 – 3 March 1707), commonly known by the title Aurangzeb, (Note: Persian pronunciation: [ʔaw.ɾaŋɡ.ˈzeːb] lit. 'Ornament of the Throne'; Awrangzeb) was the sixth Mughal emperor, reigning from 1658 until his death in 1707. Under his reign, the Mughal Empire reached its greatest extent, with territory spanning nearly the entirety of the Indian subcontinent.

Aurangzeb and the Mughals belonged to a branch of the Timurid dynasty. He held administrative and military posts under his father Shah Jahan (r. 1628–1658) and gained recognition as an accomplished military commander. Aurangzeb served as the viceroy of the Deccan in 1636–1637 and the governor of Gujarat in 1645–1647. He jointly administered the provinces of Multan and Sindh in 1648–1652 and continued expeditions into the neighbouring Safavid territories. In September 1657, Shah Jahan nominated his eldest and liberalist son Dara Shikoh as his successor, a move repudiated by Aurangzeb, who proclaimed himself emperor in February 1658. In April 1658, Aurangzeb defeated the allied army of Shikoh and the Kingdom of Marwar at the Battle of Dharmat. Aurangzeb's decisive victory at the Battle of Samugarh in May 1658 cemented his sovereignty and his suzerainty was acknowledged throughout the Empire. After Shah Jahan recovered from illness in July 1658, Aurangzeb declared him incompetent to rule and imprisoned his father in the Agra Fort.

Aurangzeb's reign is characterised by a period of rapid military expansion, with several dynasties and states being overthrown by the Mughals. The Mughals also surpassed Qing China as the world's largest economy and biggest manufacturing power. The Mughal military gradually improved and became one of the strongest armies in the world. A staunch Muslim, Aurangzeb is credited with the construction of numerous mosques and patronising works of Arabic calligraphy. He successfully imposed the Fatawa-i Alamgiri as the principal regulating body of the empire and prohibited religiously forbidden activities in Islam. Although Aurangzeb suppressed several local revolts, he maintained cordial relations with foreign governments.

His empire was also one of the largest in Indian history. However, his emperorship has a complicated legacy. His critics, citing his actions against the non-Muslims and his conservative view of Islam, argue that he abandoned the legacy of pluralism and tolerance of the earlier Mughal emperors. Others, however, reject these assertions, arguing that he opposed bigotry against Hindus, Sikhs and Shia Muslims and that he employed significantly more Hindus in his imperial bureaucracy than his predecessors.

== Early life ==
Shah Jahan holding Aurangzeb in his lap, c. 1620

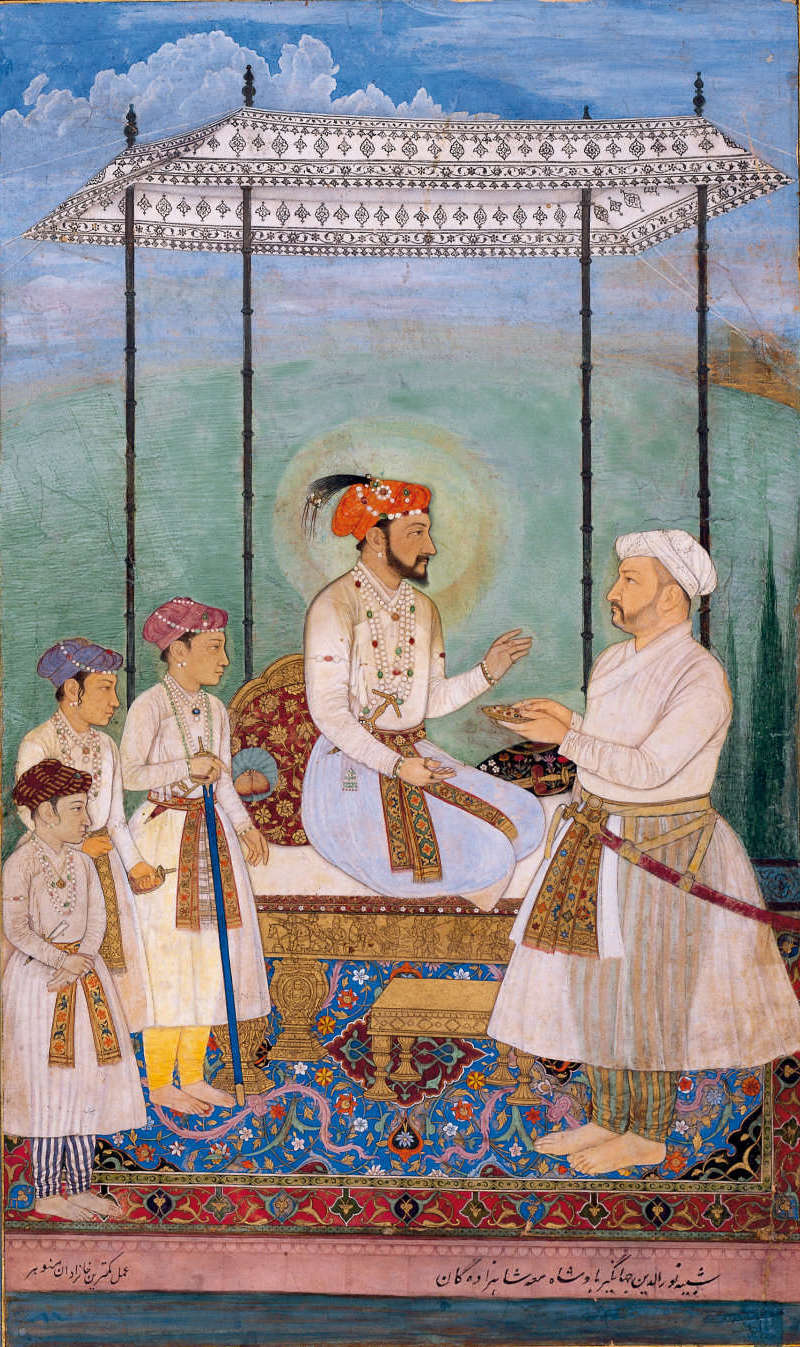
Young Prince Aurangzeb (far left), aged 9–10, with his brothers Dara Shikoh, Shah Shuja, their father Shah Jahan (centre), and maternal grandfather Asaf Khan IV (right) c. 1628

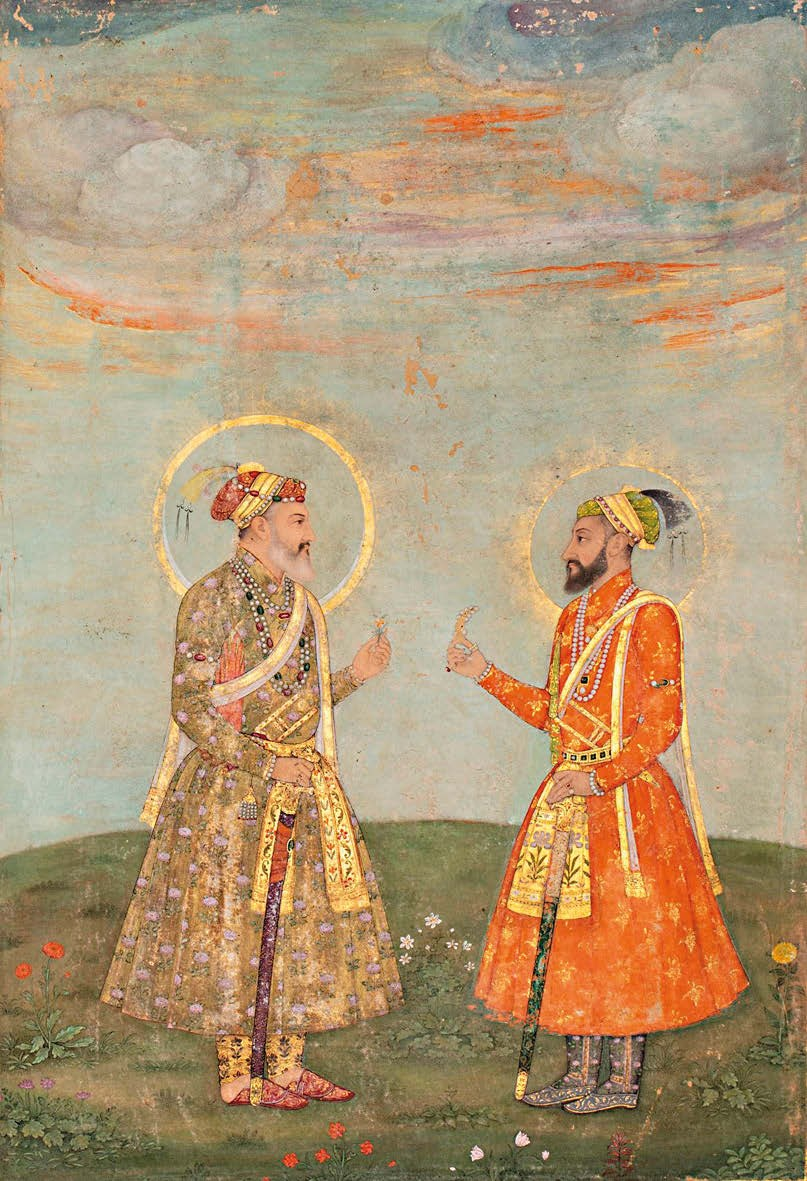
Shah Jahan (left) and Aurangzeb (right), c. 1659

Aurangzeb was born in Dahod on 3 November 1618. He was the sixth child of Shah Jahan and Mumtaz Mahal. Aurangzeb was a patrilineal descendent of Timur.

In June 1626, after an unsuccessful rebellion by his father, eight-year-old Aurangzeb and his brother Dara Shikoh were sent to the Mughal court in Lahore as hostages of their grandfather Jahangir and his wife, Nur Jahan, as part of their father's pardon deal. After Jahangir died in 1627, Shah Jahan emerged victorious in the ensuing war of succession to the Mughal throne. Aurangzeb and his brother were consequently reunited with Shah Jahan in Agra in 1628. Aurangzeb's daily allowance was fixed at 500 rupees.

As a Mughal prince, Aurangzeb received an education covering subjects like combat, military strategy, and administration. His curriculum also included areas like Islamic studies, Turkic and Persian literature. Aurangzeb grew up fluent in the Hindustani language. He was also fluent in his ancestral language of Chagatai Turkic, but similar to his predecessors, he preferred to use Persian. He had mastered the Quran and the hadith.

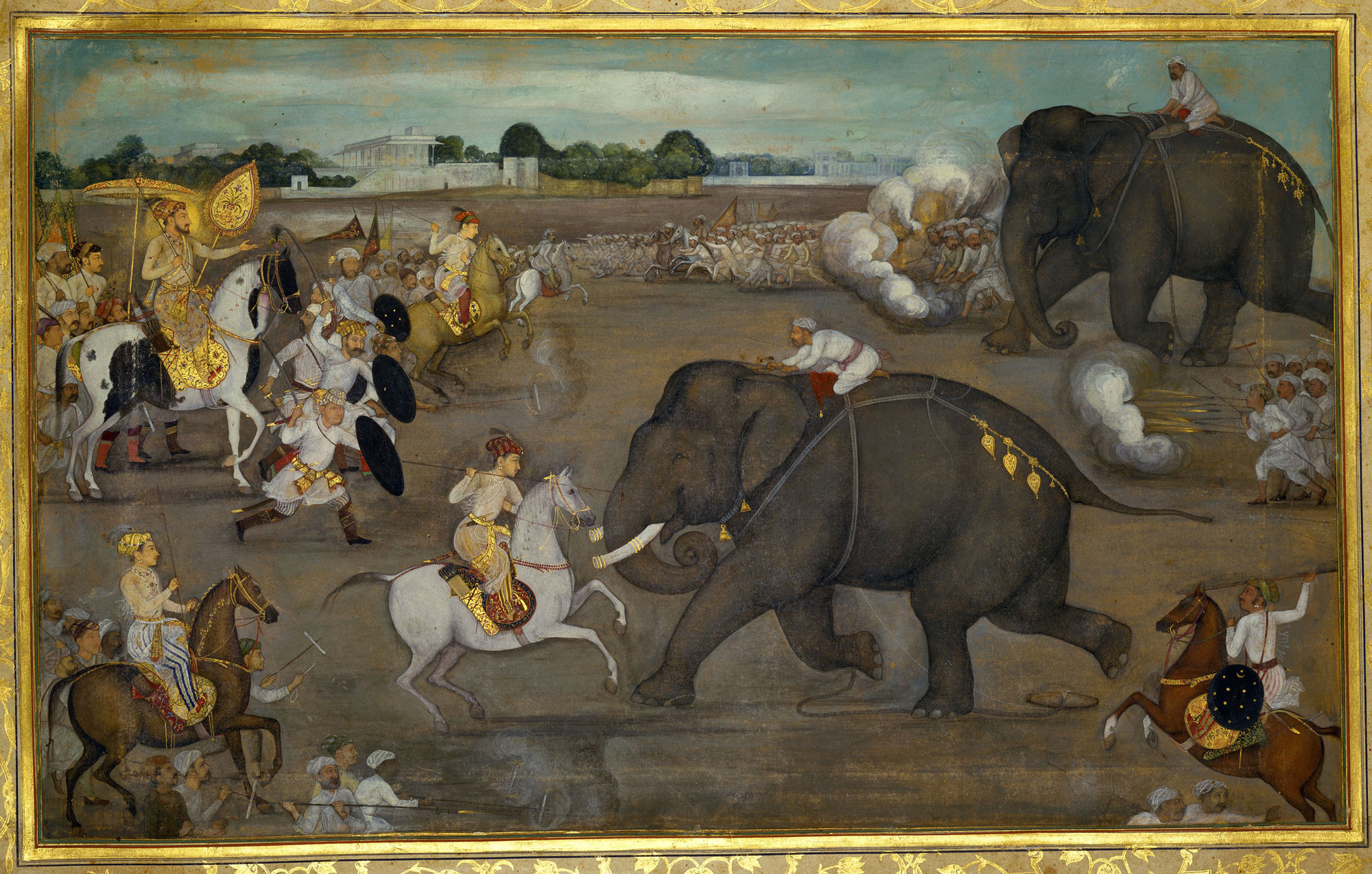
A painting c. 1635 from the Padshahnama depicts Prince Aurangzeb facing a maddened war elephant named Sudhakar, Royal Collection.

On 28 May 1633, a war elephant stampeded through the Mughal imperial encampment. Aurangzeb rode against the elephant and threw his spear at its head. He was unhorsed but escaped death. For his courage, Aurangzeb's father conferred on him the title of Bahadur (brave) and presented him with gifts. When chided for his recklessness, Aurangzeb replied:

If the fight had ended fatally for me it would not have been a matter of shame. Death drops the curtain even on emperors; it is no dishonor. The shame lay in what my brothers did!

Historians have interpreted this as an unjust taunt with cowardice against his brothers. Shuja had also faced the elephant and wounded it with his spear. Dara had been too far away to come to their assistance.

Three days later Aurangzeb turned fifteen. Shah Jahan weighed him and presented him 5,000 mohars, the elephant named Sudhakar, along with other presents worth 200,000 rupees. His bravery against the elephant was documented in Persian and Urdu verses.

== Ancestry ==
Aurangzeb's Ancestors

Babur	Maham Begum	Prithviraj Singh I	Apurva Devi
Humayun	Hamida Banu Begum	Raja Bharmal	Rani Champavati Solanki
Akbar	Mariam-uz-Zamani	Udai Singh of Marwar	Manrang Devi
Jahangir	Jagat Gosain
Shah Jahan
Aurangzeb

Ancestors of Aurangzeb

8. Akbar I
4. Jahangir
9. Mariam-uz-Zamani
2. Shah Jahan I
10. Udai Singh I
5. Jagat Gosain
11. Manrang Devi
1. Aurangzeb
12. I'timad-ud-Daulah
6. Abu'l-Hasan Asaf Khan
13. Asmat Begam
3. Mumtaz Mahal
14. Ghias ud-din 'Ali Asaf Khan
7. Diwanji Begum

== Career as prince ==
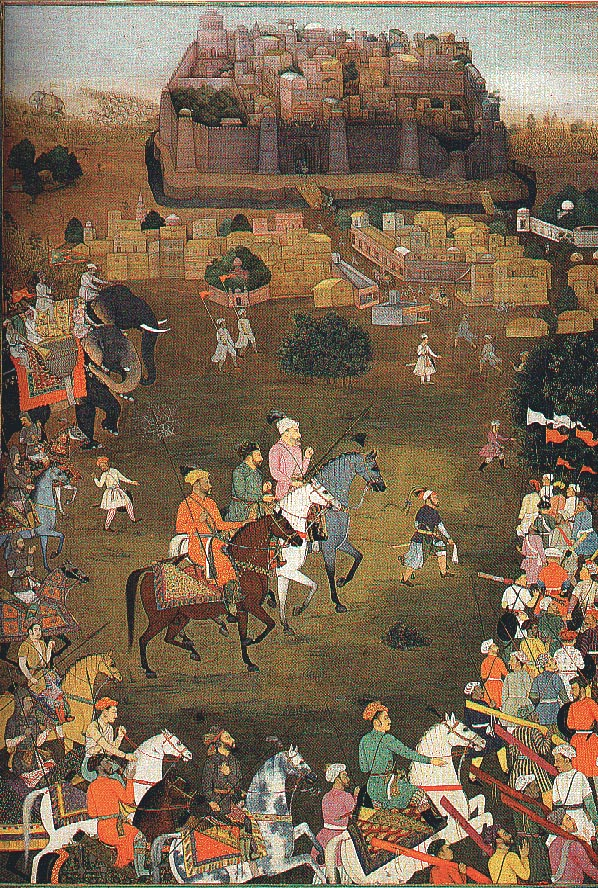
The Mughal Army under the command of Aurangzeb recaptures Orchha in October 1635.

In December 1634, he was assigned to his first post with the rank of ten thousand horse and four thousand troopers, also was allowed to use the royal prerogative of red tent. Aurangzeb was nominally in charge of the force sent to Bundelkhand with the intent of subduing the rebellious ruler of Orchha, Jhujhar Singh, who had attacked another territory in defiance of Shah Jahan's policy and had refused to atone for his actions. By arrangement, Aurangzeb stayed in the rear, away from the fighting, and took the advice of his generals as the Mughal Army gathered and commenced the siege of Orchha in 1635. The campaign was successful and Singh was removed from power.

=== First Deccan governorate (1636–1644) ===
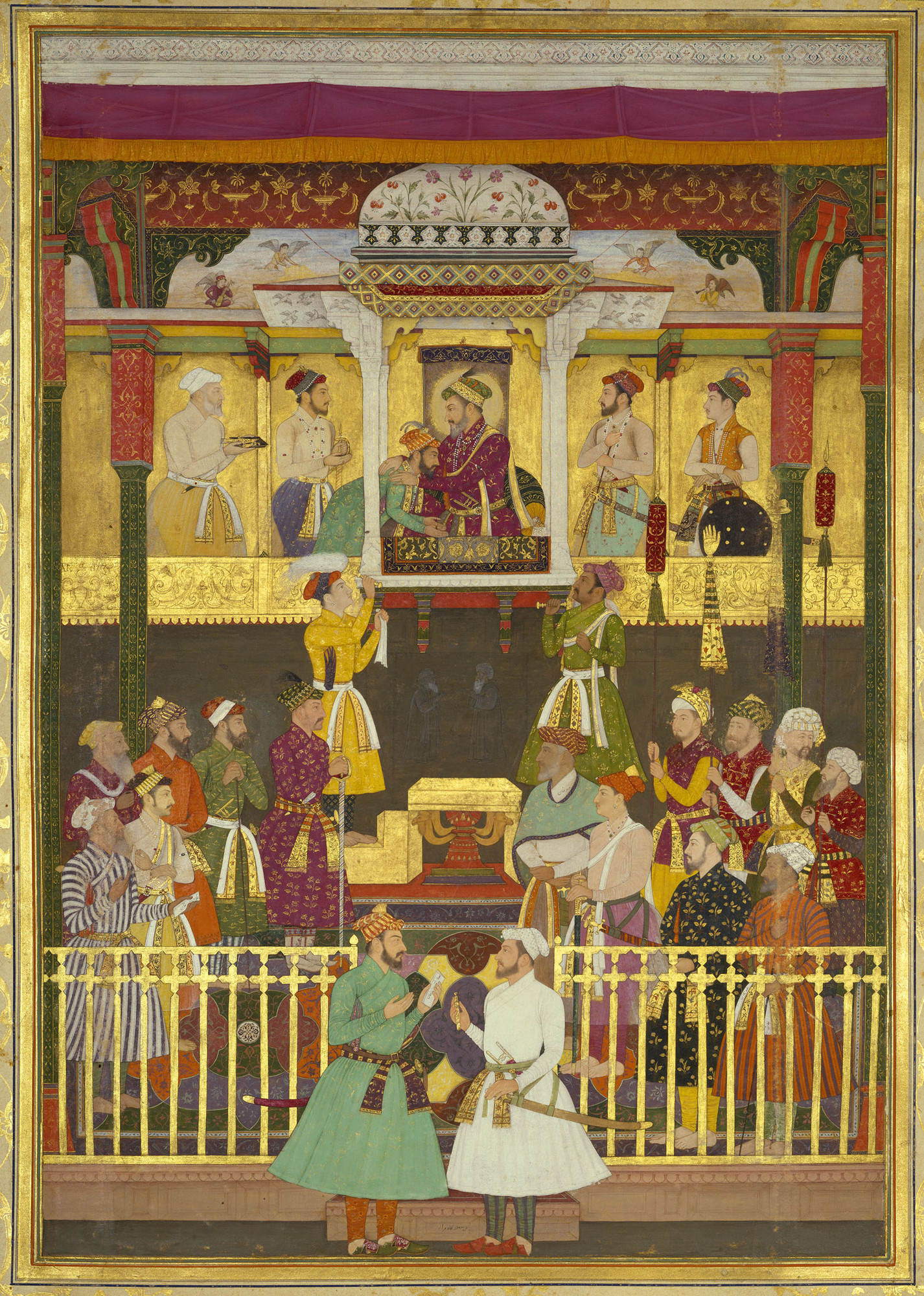
Prince Aurangzeb meeting Emperor Shah Jahan at the court of Lahore in January 1640

Aurangzeb, c. 1640

Aurangzeb was appointed viceroy of the Deccan in 1636. After Shah Jahan's vassals had been devastated by the alarming expansion of Ahmednagar during the reign of the Nizam Shahi boy-prince Murtaza Shah III, the emperor dispatched Aurangzeb, who in 1636 brought the Nizam Shahi dynasty to an end. The Mughal provinces of Deccan at that time were Khandesh, Berar, Telangana and Daulatabad. The entire region with 64 forts, were in charge of Aurangzeb, while ten more forts had yet to be conquered by the Mughals. In 1637, Aurangzeb married the Safavid princess Dilras Banu, posthumously known as Rabia-ud-Daurani. She was his first wife and chief consort as well as his favourite. He also had an infatuation with a slave girl, Hira Bai, whose death at a young age greatly affected him. In his old age, he was under the charms of his concubine, Udaipuri Mahal. The latter had formerly been a companion to Dara Shukoh.

In the same year, 1637, Aurangzeb was placed in charge of annexing the small Rajput kingdom of Baglana, which he did with ease. In 1638, Aurangzeb married Nawab Bai, later known as Rahmat an-Nisa. That same year, Aurangzeb dispatched an army to subdue the Portuguese coastal fortress of Daman, however his forces met stubborn resistance and were eventually repulsed at the end of a long siege. At some point, Aurangzeb married Aurangabadi Mahal, who was a Circassian or Georgian.

Aurangzeb arrived in Agra on 2 May 1644 to see his sister Jahanara who was severely burnt in an accident two months prior. Shah Jahan was outraged to see Aurangzeb enter the interior palace compound in military attire and immediately dismissed him from his position of viceroy of the Deccan; Aurangzeb was also no longer allowed to use red tents or to associate himself with the official military standard of the Mughal emperor. Other sources state that Aurangzeb was dismissed from his position because Aurangzeb left the life of luxury and became a faqir.

Aurangzeb's first viceroyalty of the Deccan lasted eight years from 14 July 1636 to 28 May 1644 before his dismissal.

=== Governor of Gujarat (1645–1647) ===
In 1644–45, he was barred from the court for seven months. It is reported that he mentioned his grief about this to fellow Mughal commanders. Thereafter, Shah Jahan appointed him governor of Gujarat. His tenure in Gujarat was marked with religious disputes but he was rewarded for bringing stability. In September 1646, Shah Jahan called Aurangzeb off from Gujarat, assigning the charge to Shaista Khan. On 20 January 1647, he met the emperor at Lahore, where he was promoted as the chief commander of Balkh and Badakhshan.

=== Governor of Balkh (1647–1648) ===
In 1647, Shah Jahan transferred Aurangzeb from Gujarat to Balkh, replacing a younger son, Murad Baksh, who had proved ineffective there. The area was under attack from Uzbek and Turkmen tribes. The Mughal artillery and muskets were offset by the skirmishing skills of their opponents which led to a stalemate. Aurangzeb discovered that his army could not live off the land, which was devastated by war. It is recorded that during the battle against the Uzbeks during this campaign, Aurangzeb dismounted from his elephant ride to recite prayer to the surprise of the opposing force commander.

With the onset of winter, he and his father had to make an unsatisfactory deal with the Uzbeks. Mughals had to give away territory in exchange for nominal recognition of Mughal sovereignty. The Mughal force suffered still further with attacks by Uzbeks and other tribesmen as it retreated during the snowfall to Kabul. By the end of this two-year campaign, into which Aurangzeb had been plunged at a late stage, a vast sum of money had been expended for little gain.

=== Governor of Multan and Sindh (1648–1652) ===
Further unsuccessful military involvements followed, as Aurangzeb was appointed governor of Multan and Sindh. His efforts in 1649 and 1652 to dislodge the Safavids at Kandahar which they had recently retaken after a decade of Mughal control ended in failure as winter approached. The logistical problems of supplying an army at the extremity of the empire, combined with the poor quality of armaments and the intransigence of the opposition have been cited by John Richards as the reasons for failure. A third attempt in 1653, led by Dara Shikoh, met with the same outcome.

=== Second Deccan governorate (1653–1658) ===
On 17 July 1652, Aurangzeb became viceroy of the Deccan again after he was replaced by Dara Shikoh in the attempt to recapture Kandahar. Aurangzeb's two jagirs (land grants) were moved there as a consequence of his return. Deccan was a relatively impoverished area, which caused him to lose out financially. The area required grants were required from Malwa and Gujarat in order to maintain the administration. The situation caused ill-feeling between him and his father Shah Jahan who insisted that things could be improved if Aurangzeb made efforts to develop cultivation.

Aurangzeb appointed Murshid Quli Khan to extend the zabt revenue system used in northern India to the Deccan. Murshid Quli Khan organised a survey of agricultural land and a tax assessment on what it produced. To increase revenue, Murshid Quli Khan granted loans for seed, livestock, and irrigation infrastructure. This led the Deccan region to return to prosperity.

Aurangzeb, c. 1645

Aurangzeb, c. 1650

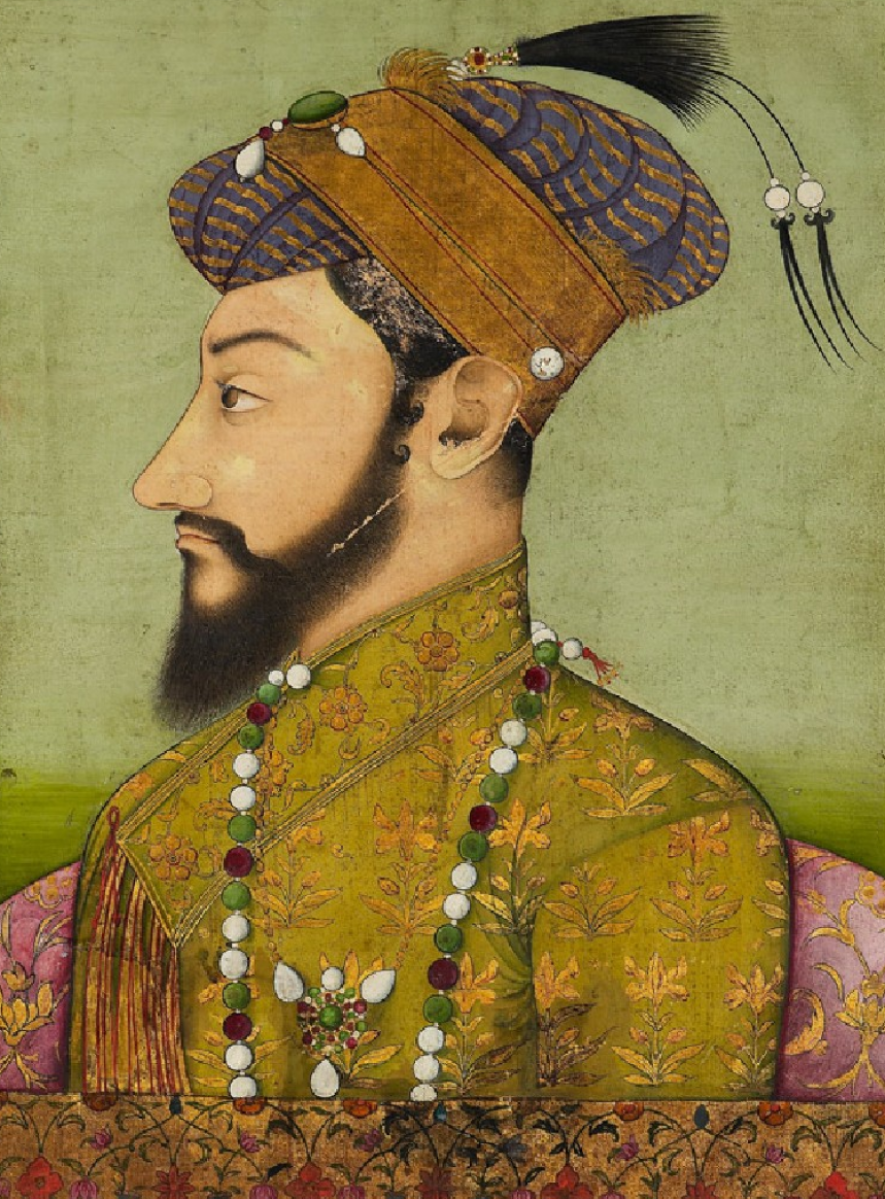
Aurangzeb, c. 1655

Aurangzeb proposed to resolve financial difficulties by attacking the dynastic occupants of Golconda (the Qutb Shahis) and Bijapur (the Adil Shahis). This proposal would also extend Mughal influence by accruing more lands. Aurangzeb advanced against the Sultan of Bijapur and besieged Bidar. The Kiladar (governor or captain) of the fortified city, Sidi Marjan, was mortally wounded when a gunpowder magazine exploded. After twenty-seven days of fighting, Bidar was captured by the Mughals, and Aurangzeb continued his advance. Aurangzeb would go on to successfully capture the fort of Kalyani two months after the capitulation of Bidar, but his invasion of Bijapur would be cut short by a peace treaty negotiated by Shah Jahan with Bijapur which ceded Bidar, Parenda, and Kalyani. Aurangzeb suspected Dara had exerted influence on his father. He believed that he was on the verge of victory in both instances, and was frustrated that Shah Jahan chose then to settle for negotiations with the opposing forces rather than pushing for complete victory.

== War of succession ==
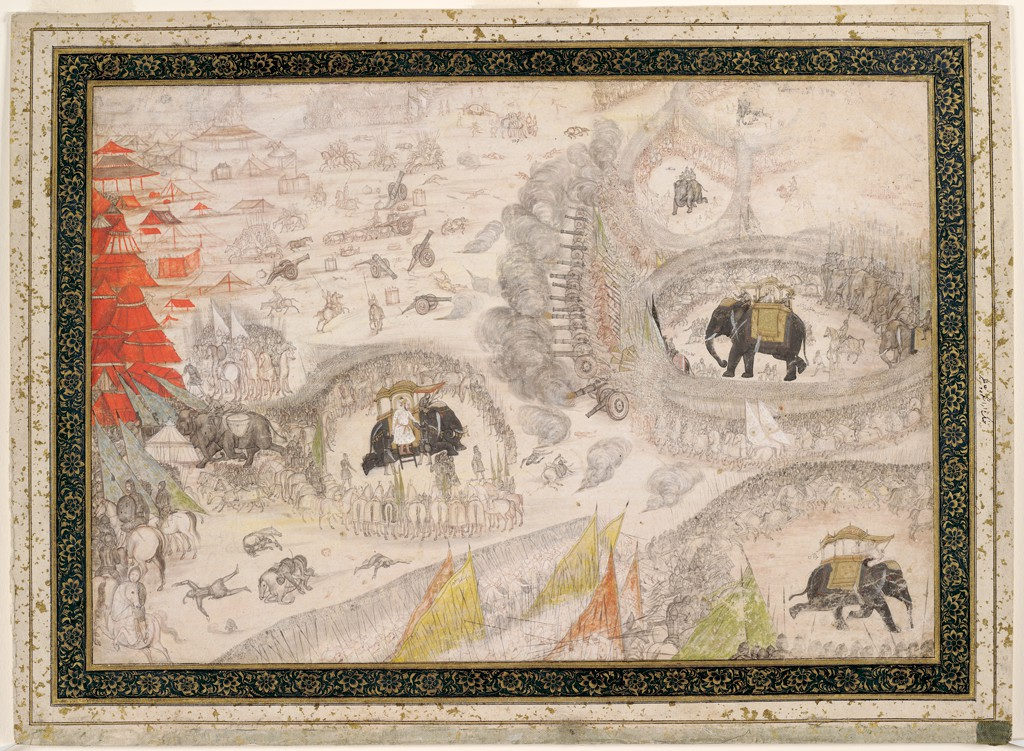
The Battle of Samugarh was fought in 1658, part of the Mughal war of succession

The four sons of Shah Jahan all held governorships during their father's reign. The emperor favoured the eldest, Dara Shikoh. This had caused resentment among the younger three, who sought at various times to strengthen alliances between themselves and against Dara. There was no Mughal tradition of primogeniture, the systematic passing of rule, upon an emperor's death, to his eldest son. Instead it was customary for sons to overthrow their father and for brothers to war to the death among themselves.

Historian Satish Chandra says that "In the ultimate resort, connections among the powerful military leaders, and military strength and capacity [were] the real arbiters". The contest for power was primarily between Dara Shikoh and Aurangzeb because, although all four sons had demonstrated competence in their official roles, it was around these two that the supporting cast of officials and other influential people mostly circulated. There were ideological differences – Dara was an intellectual and a religious liberal in the mould of Akbar, while Aurangzeb was much more conservative – but, as historians Barbara D. Metcalf and Thomas R. Metcalf say, "To focus on divergent philosophies neglects the fact that Dara was a poor general and leader. It also ignores the fact that factional lines in the succession dispute were not, by and large, shaped by ideology."

Marc Gaborieau, professor of Indian studies at l'École des Hautes Études en Sciences Sociales, explains that "The loyalties of [officials and their armed contingents] seem to have been motivated more by their own interests, the closeness of the family relation and above all the charisma of the pretenders than by ideological divides." Muslims and Hindus did not divide along religious lines in their support for one pretender or the other, nor, according to Chandra, is there much evidence to support the belief that Jahanara and other members of the royal family were split in their support. Jahanara, certainly, interceded at various times on behalf of all of the princes and was well-regarded by Aurangzeb even though she shared the religious outlook of Dara.

In 1656, a general under Qutb Shahi dynasty named Musa Khan led an army of 12,000 musketeers to attack Aurangzeb, who was besieging Golconda Fort. Later in the same campaign, Aurangzeb, in turn, rode against an army consisting of 8,000 horsemen and 20,000 Karnataki musketeers.

After making clear his desire for his son Dara to take over after him, Shah Jahan fell ill with strangury in 1657. He was kept in seclusion and cared for by Dara in the newly built city of Shahjahanabad (Old Delhi). Rumours spread that Shah Jahan had died, which led to concerns among his younger sons. These younger sons took military actions seemingly in response, but it is not known whether these preparations were made in the mistaken belief that the rumours of death of Shah Jahan were true and that Dara might be hiding it for political gain, or whether the challengers were taking advantage of the situation.

In Bengal, Shah Shuja who he had been governor there since 1637 crowned himself king. He brought his cavalry, artillery and river flotilla upriver towards Agra. Near Varanasi his forces confronted a defending army sent from Delhi under the command of Prince Sulaiman Shikoh, the son of Dara Shikoh, and Raja Jai Singh. Murad did the same at Gujarat, as did Aurangzeb in the Deccan.

After regaining some of his health, Shah Jahan moved to Agra and Dara urged him to send forces to challenge Shah Shuja and Murad, who had declared themselves rulers in their respective territories. While Shah Shuja was defeated at Varanasi in February 1658, the army sent to deal with Murad discovered to their surprise that he and Aurangzeb had combined their forces, the two brothers having agreed to partition the empire once they had gained control of it.

The two armies clashed at Dharmat in April 1658, with Aurangzeb being the victor. Shuja was chased through Bihar. The victory of Aurangzeb proved this to be a poor decision by Dara Shikoh, who now had a defeated force on one front and a successful force unnecessarily pre-occupied on another. Realising that his recalled Bihar forces would not arrive at Agra in time to resist the emboldened Aurangzeb's advance, Dara scrambled to form alliances in order but found that Aurangzeb had already courted key potential candidates.

When Dara's disparate, hastily assembled army clashed with Aurangzeb's well-disciplined, battle-hardened force at the battle of Samugarh in late May, neither Dara's men nor his generalship were any match for Aurangzeb. Dara had also become over-confident in his own abilities and, by ignoring advice not to lead in battle while his father was alive, he cemented the idea that he had usurped the throne. "After the defeat of Dara, Shah Jahan was imprisoned in the fort of Agra where he spent eight long years under the care of his favourite daughter Jahanara."

Aurangzeb then broke his arrangement with Murad Baksh, which probably had been his intention all along. Instead of looking to partition the empire between himself and Murad, he had his brother arrested and imprisoned at Gwalior Fort. Murad was executed on 4 December 1661, ostensibly for the murder of the diwan of Gujarat. The allegation was encouraged by Aurangzeb, who caused the diwan's son to seek retribution for the death under the principles of Sharia law.

Meanwhile, Dara gathered his forces, and moved to the Punjab. The army sent against Shuja was trapped in the east, its generals Jai Singh and Dilir Khan submitted to Aurangzeb, but Dara's son, Suleiman Shikoh, escaped. Aurangzeb offered Shah Shuja the governorship of Bengal. This move had the effect of isolating Dara Shikoh and causing more troops to defect to Aurangzeb. Shah Shuja, who had declared himself emperor in Bengal began to annex more territory and this prompted Aurangzeb to march from Punjab with a new and large army. In the battle of Khajwa, Shah Shuja and his chain-mail armoured war elephants were routed by the forces loyal to Aurangzeb. Shah Shuja then fled to Arakan (in present-day Burma), where he was executed by the local rulers.

With Shuja and Murad disposed of, and with his father immured in Agra, Aurangzeb pursued Dara Shikoh, chasing him across the north-western bounds of the empire. Aurangzeb claimed that Dara was no longer a Muslim and accused him of poisoning the Mughal Grand Vizier Saadullah Khan. After a series of battles, defeats and retreats, Dara was betrayed by one of his generals, who arrested and bound him. In 1658, Aurangzeb arranged his formal coronation in Delhi.

On 10 August 1659, Dara was executed on grounds of apostasy and his head was sent to Shah Jahan. This was the first prominent execution of Aurangzeb based on accusations of being influenced by Hinduism, however some sources argue it was done for political reasons. Aurangzeb had his allied brother Prince Murad Baksh held for murder, judged and then executed. Aurangzeb was accused of poisoning his imprisoned nephew Sulaiman Shikoh. Having secured his position, Aurangzeb confined his frail father at the Agra Fort but did not mistreat him. Shah Jahan was cared for by Jahanara and died in 1666.

== Reign ==
=== Full title ===
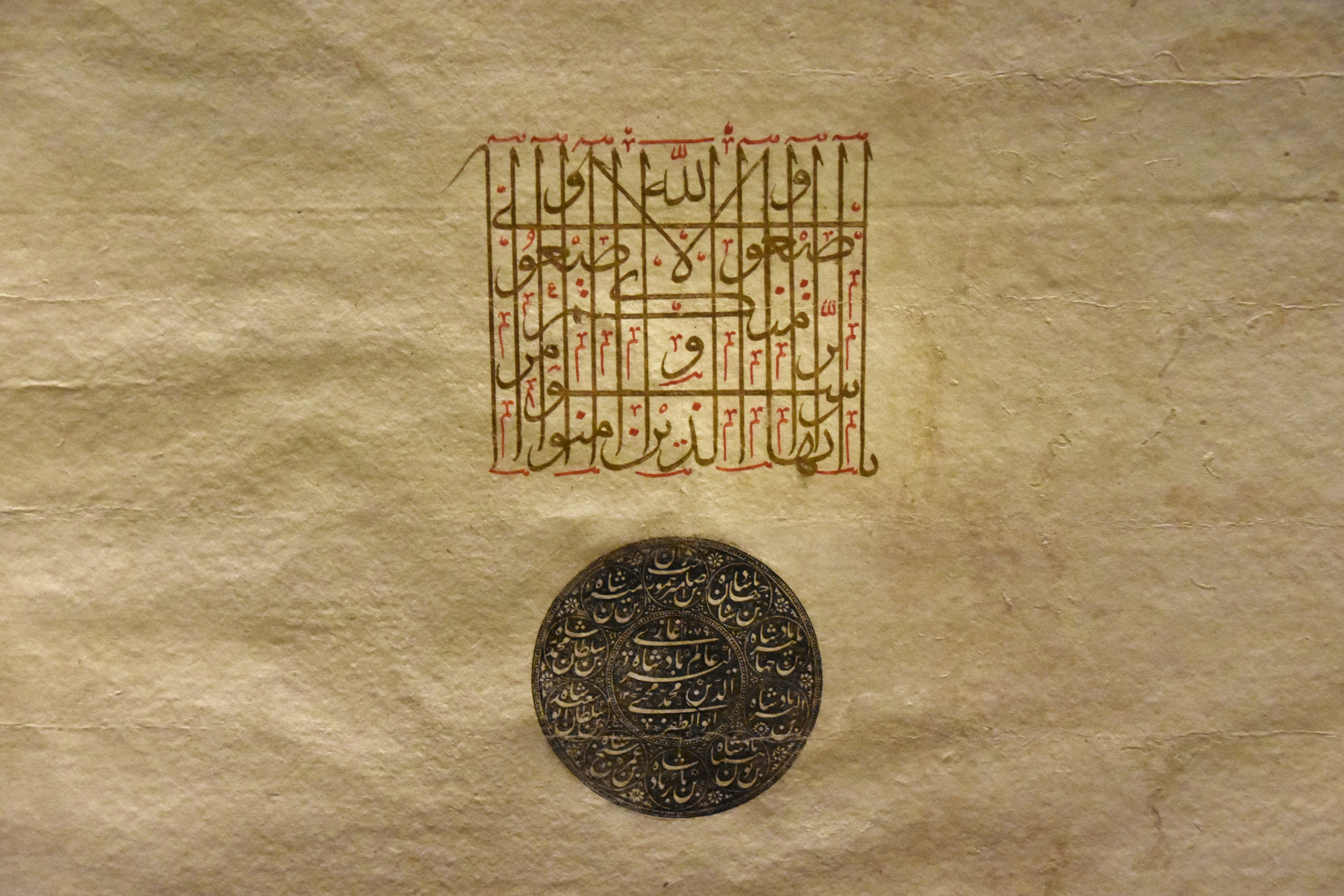
Tughra and a seal of Aurangzeb, on an imperial firman

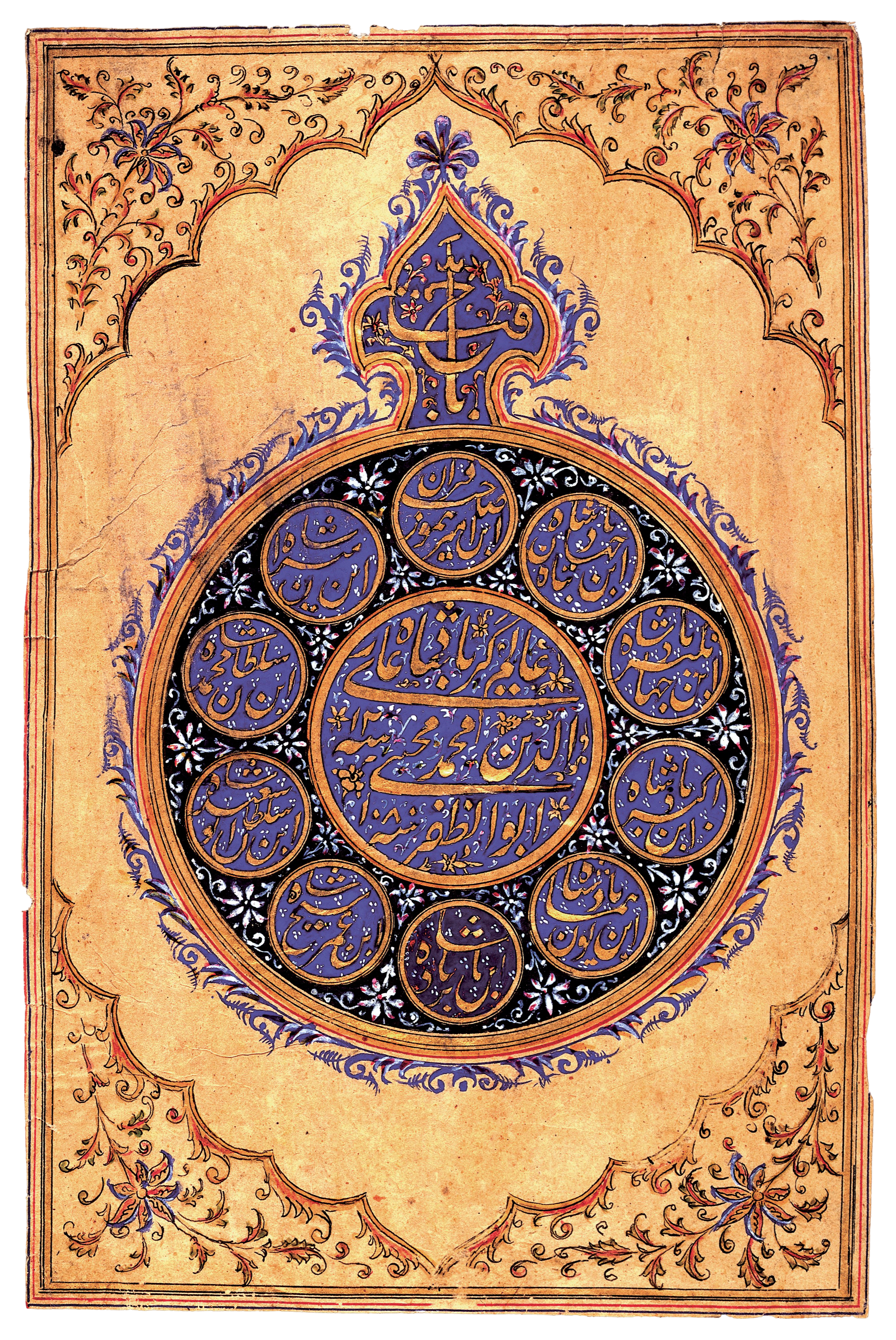
Imperial Seal of Aurangzeb

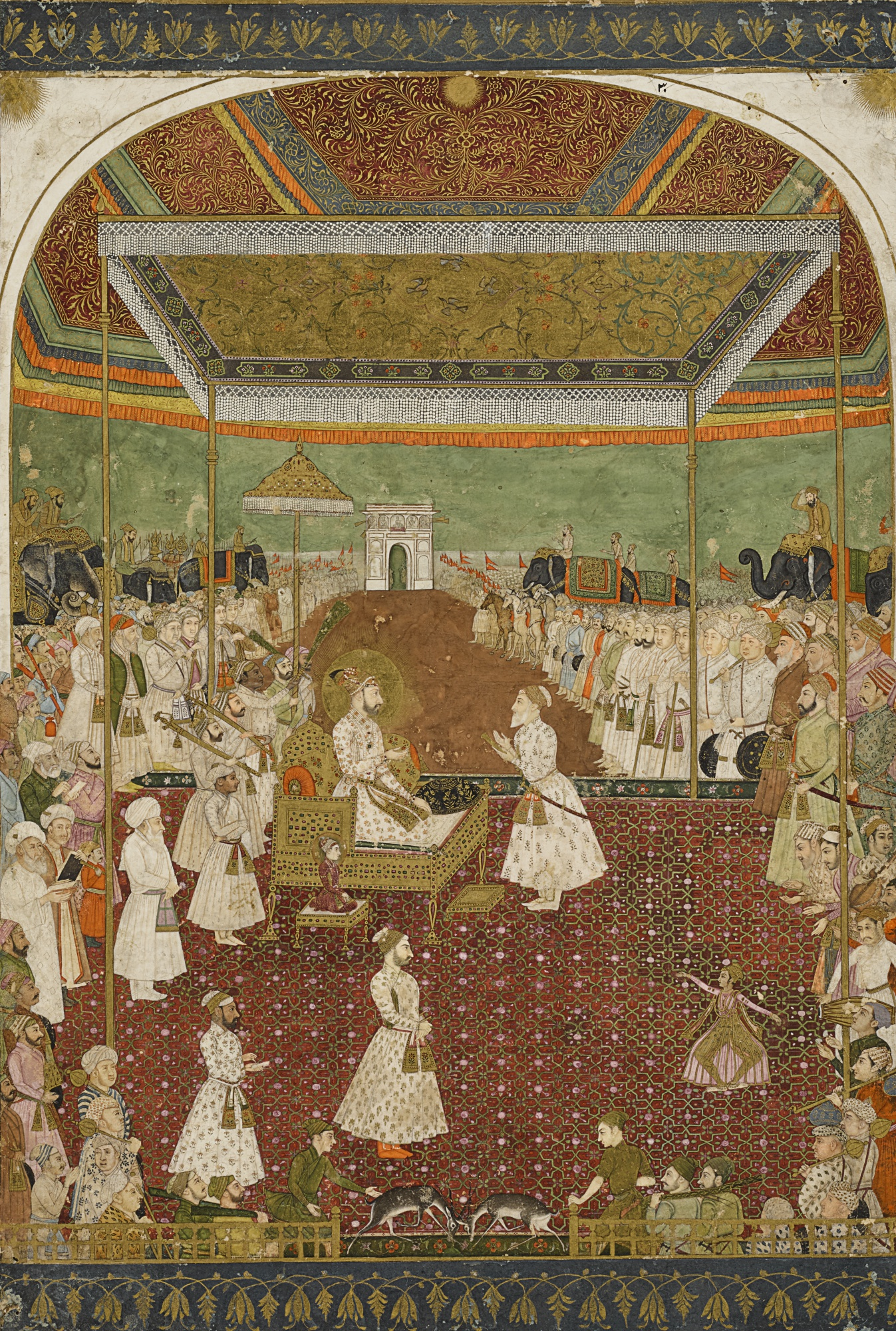
Aurangzeb, enthroned beneath a canopy decorated with birds of paradise. It also includes his third son, Muhammad Azam Shah. The painting was probably painted by the court painter, Bichitr

The epithet Aurangzeb means 'Ornament of the Throne'. His chosen title Alamgir translates to Conqueror of the World.

Aurangzeb's full imperial title was:

Al-Sultan al-Azam wal Khaqan al-Mukarram Hazrat Abul Muzaffar Muhy-ud-Din Muhammad Aurangzeb Bahadur Alamgir I, Badshah Ghazi, Shahanshah-e-Sultanat-ul-Hindiya Wal Mughaliya.

Aurangzeb had also been attributed various other titles including Caliph of The Merciful, Monarch of Islam, and Living Custodian of God.

=== Bureaucracy ===
Aurangzeb's imperial bureaucracy employed significantly more Hindus than that of his predecessors.

Between 1679 and 1707, the number of Hindu officials in the Mughal administration rose by half to 31.6% due to an increased recruitment of Marathas for the purpose of Deccan campaign. In the second half of his rule, the Marathas outnumbered Rajputs in his administration. Nevertheless, he tried to decrease the number of non-Muslim nobles in his court and encouraged high ranking Hindu officials to convert to Islam.

=== Economy ===
Under his reign, the Mughal Empire contributed to the world's GDP by nearly 25%, surpassing Qing China. This made it the world's largest economy and biggest manufacturing power. At the time, it was more than the entirety of Western Europe, and signalled proto-industrialisation.

=== Religious policy ===
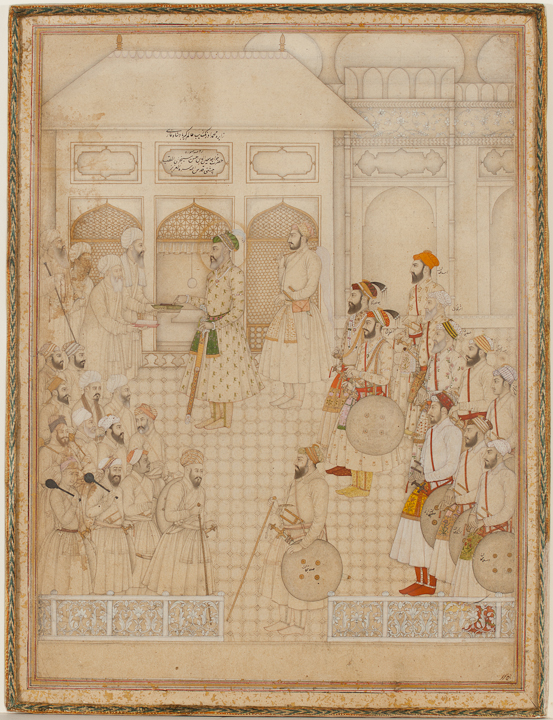
Emperor Aurangzeb at the Shrine of Mu'in al-Din Chishti in Ajmer, Rajasthan.

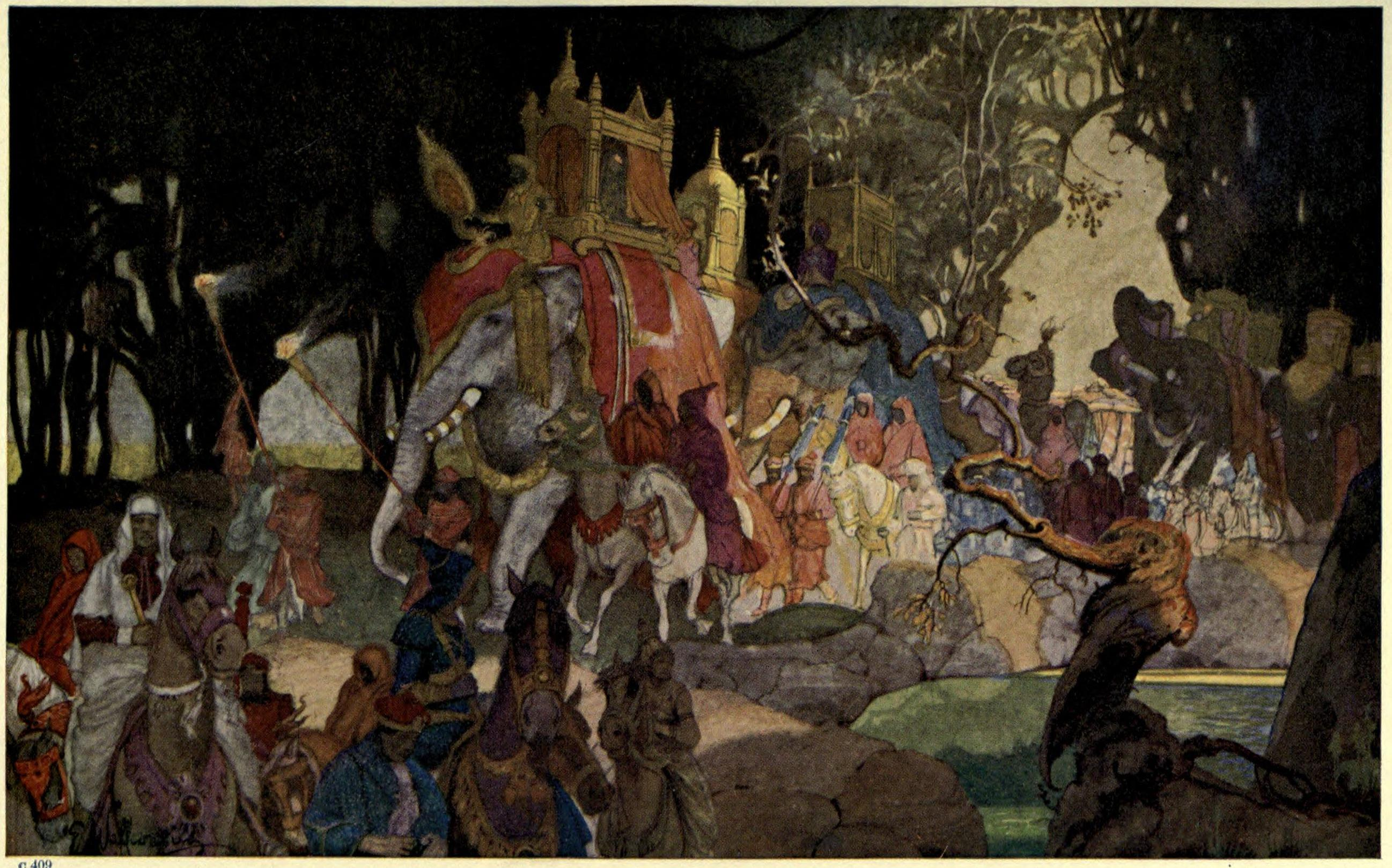
The queens and ladies of the harem of Aurangzeb travelling to Kashmir by Harry Johnston in 1913.

Aurangzeb was an orthodox Muslim ruler. Subsequent to the policies of his three predecessors, he endeavoured to make Islam a dominant force in his reign. However, several groups were opposed to these policies. Aurangzeb was a follower of the Mujaddidi Order and a disciple of the son of the Punjabi saint, Ahmad Sirhindi. He sought to establish Islamic rule as instructed and inspired by him.

Sheikh Muhammad Ikram states that after returning from Kashmir, Aurangzeb issued order in 1663, to ban the practice of Sati, a practice of self-immolation. Ikram recorded that Aurangzeb issued the decree:

in all lands under Mughal control, never again should the officials allow a woman to be burnt.

Although Aurangzeb's orders could be evaded with payment of bribes to officials, adds Ikram, later European travellers record that sati was not much practised in Mughal empire, and that sati was "very rare, except it be some Rajah's wives, that the Indian women burn at all" by the end of Aurangzeb's reign.

Historian Katherine Brown has noted that "The very name of Aurangzeb seems to act in the popular imagination as a signifier of politico-religious bigotry and repression, regardless of historical accuracy." The subject has also resonated in modern times with popularly accepted claims that he intended to destroy the Bamiyan Buddhas. As a political and religious conservative, Aurangzeb chose not to follow the secular-religious viewpoints of his predecessors after his ascension. He made no mention of the Persian concept of kinship, the Farr-i-Aizadi, and based his rule on the Quranic concept of kingship.

Shah Jahan had already moved away from the liberalism of Akbar, although in a token manner rather than with the intent of suppressing Hinduism, (Note: Regarding the tokenistic aspect of Shah Jahan's actions to strengthen Islam in his empire, Satish Chandra says, "We may conclude that Shah Jahan tried to effect a compromise. While formally declaring the state to be an Islamic one, showing respect to the sharia, and observing its injunctions in his personal life, he did not reject any of the liberal measures of Akbar. ... Shah Jahan's compromise was based not on principle but on expediency.") and Aurangzeb took the change still further. Though the approach to faith of Akbar, Jahangir and Shah Jahan was more syncretic than Babur, the founder of the empire, Aurangzeb's position is not so obvious.

Handprint of Aurangzeb

His emphasis on sharia competed, or was directly in conflict, with his insistence that zawabit or secular decrees could supersede sharia. The chief qazi refusing to crown him in 1659, Aurangzeb had a political need to present himself as a "defender of the sharia" due to popular opposition to his actions against his father and brothers. Despite claims of sweeping edicts and policies, contradictory accounts exist. Historian Katherine Brown has argued that Aurangzeb never imposed a complete ban on music. He sought to codify Hanafi law by the work of several hundred jurists, called Fatawa 'Alamgiri. It is possible the War of Succession and continued incursions combined with Shah Jahan's spending made cultural expenditure impossible.

He learnt that at Multan, Thatta, and particularly at Varanasi, Brahmins belonging to "established schools" were teaching "false books" and had attracted numerous Hindus and Muslims. He ordered the subahdars of these provinces to demolish the schools and the temples of non-Muslims. From this order, Eaton notes the Mughal court was keen to stamp out "a certain kind of teaching" although it is unknown exactly what teachings or books the order references.

Aurangzeb ordered subahdars to punish Muslims who dressed like non-Muslims. The executions of the antinomian Sufi mystic Sarmad Kashani and the ninth Sikh Guru Tegh Bahadur bear testimony to Aurangzeb's religious policy; the former was beheaded on multiple accounts of heresy, (Note: It has however been argued that the Mughal emperor had political motives for this particular execution. See the article on Sarmad Kashani for references.) the latter, according to Sikhs, because he objected to Aurangzeb's forced conversions. Aurangzeb had also banned the celebration of the Zoroastrian festival of Nauroz along with other un-Islamic ceremonies, and encouraged conversions to Islam; instances of persecution against particular Muslim factions were also reported.

Yohanan Friedmann has reported that according to many modern historians and thinkers, the puritanical thought of Ahmad Sirhindi inspired the religious orthodoxy policy of Aurangzeb.

=== Taxation policy ===
Shortly after coming to power, Aurangzeb remitted more than 80 long-standing taxes affecting all of his subjects.

Jizya tax coins of Aurangzeb

Aurangzeb holding a flywhisk
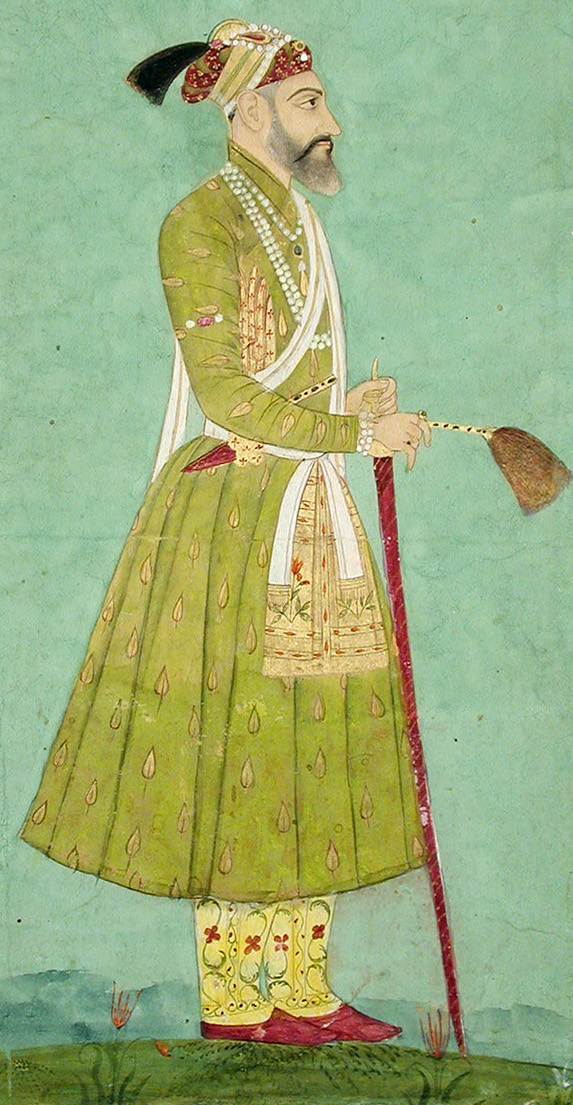
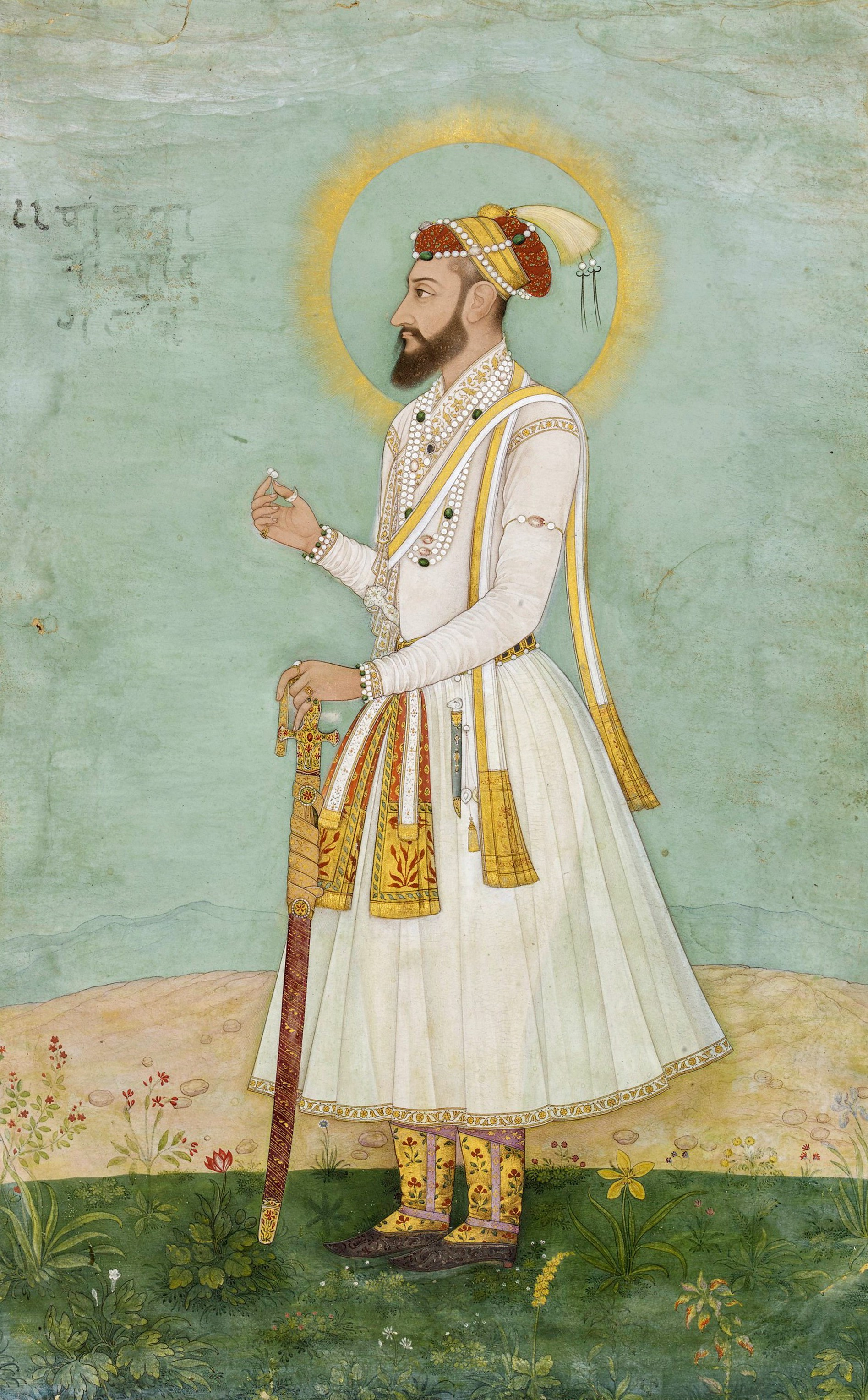

In 1679, Aurangzeb chose to reimpose jizya, a military tax on non-Muslim subjects in lieu of military service, after an abatement for a span of a hundred years, in what was critiqued by many Hindu rulers, family members of Aurangzeb, and Mughal court officials. The specific amount varied with the socioeconomic status of a subject and tax-collection was often waived for regions hit by calamities. Rajput and Maratha state officials, Brahmins, women, children, elders, the handicapped, the unemployed, the ill, and the insane were all perpetually exempted.

The collectors were mandated to be Muslims. A majority of modern scholars reject that religious bigotry influenced the imposition; rather, realpolitik — economic constraints as a result of multiple ongoing battles and establishment of credence with the orthodox ulemas — are held to be primary agents.

Aurangzeb enforced a higher tax burden on Hindu merchants at the rate of 5%, as against 2.5% on Muslim merchants, which led to considerable dislike of Aurangzeb's economic policies, a sharp turn from Akbar's uniform tax code. According to Marc Jason Gilbert, Aurangzeb ordered the jizya fees to be paid in person, in front of a tax collector, where the non Muslims were to recite a verse in the Quran that referred to their inferior status as non-Muslims. This decision led to protests and lamentations among the masses as well as Hindu court officials. In order to meet state expenditures, Aurangzeb had ordered increases in land taxes, the burden of which fell heavily upon the Hindu Jats. The reimposition of the jizya encouraged Hindus to flee to areas under East India Company jurisdiction, under which policies of religious sufferance and pretermissions of religious taxes prevailed.

Aurangzeb issued land grants and provided funds for the maintenance of shrines of worship but also often ordered their destruction. Modern historians reject the thought-school of colonial and nationalist historians about these destructions being guided by religious zealotry. Rather, the association of temples with sovereignty, power and authority is emphasised upon.

While constructing mosques was considered an act of royal duty to subjects, there are also several firmans in Aurangzeb's name supporting temples, maths, Chishti shrines, and gurudwaras, including the Mahakaleshwar temple of Ujjain, a gurudwara at Dehradun, Balaji temple of Chitrakoot, Umananda Temple of Guwahati and the Shatrunjaya Jain temples, among others.

Contemporary court chronicles mention hundreds of temples that were demolished by Aurangzeb or his chieftains upon his order. In September 1669, he ordered the destruction of Vishvanath Temple at Varanasi, which was established by Raja Man Singh, whose grandson Jai Singh was believed to have facilitated Shivaji's escape. After the Jat rebellion in Mathura (early 1670), which killed the patron of the town mosque, Aurangzeb suppressed the rebels and ordered for the city's Kesava Deo temple to be demolished, and replaced with an Eidgah.

In 1672–73, Aurangzeb ordered the resumption of all grants held by Hindus throughout the empire. This was not followed absolutely in regions such as Gujarat, where lands granted in in'am to Charans were not affected. In around 1679, he ordered the destruction of several prominent temples, including those of Khandela, Udaipur, Chittor, and Jodhpur, which were patronised by rebels.

In an order specific to Varanasi, Aurangzeb invoked Sharia to declare that Hindus would be granted state protection and temples would not be razed (but prohibited construction of any new temple); other orders to similar effect can be located. Eaton notes that numerous new temples were built in other areas of the empire during this time. Upon a critical evaluation of primary sources, he counts 15 temples to have been destroyed during Aurangzeb's reign.

=== Administrative reforms ===
Aurangzeb received tribute from all over the Indian subcontinent, using this wealth to establish bases and fortifications in India, particularly in the Carnatic, Deccan, Bengal and Lahore.

==== Revenue ====
Aurangzeb's exchequer raised £100 million in annual revenue through various sources like taxes, customs and land revenue, et al. from 24 provinces. He had an annual yearly revenue of 450 million rupees, more than ten times that of his contemporary Louis XIV of France.

==== Coins ====
A half rupee, Surat

A rupee coin showing Aurangzeb's full name, Khambhat

A rupee with a square area, Junagadh

A copper dam, Surat

Aurangzeb felt that verses from the Qur'an should not be stamped on coins, as done in former times, because they were constantly touched by the hands and feet of people. His coins had the name of the mint city and the year of issue on one face, and, the following couplet on other:

King Aurangzib 'Ālamgir
Stamped coins, in the world, like the bright full moon.

=== Law ===
Sambhaji, the Maratha king, was captured in 1688. He was brought to where Aurangzeb was encamped by the Bhima River. There a panel of Islamic jurists sentenced him to death for having slain and captured good Muslims. He was hacked to death with his corpse fed to dogs.

In 1675, the Sikh leader Guru Tegh Bahadur was arrested on orders by Aurangzeb, found guilty of blasphemy by a Qadi's court and executed.

The 32nd Da'i al-Mutlaq (Absolute Missionary) of the Dawoodi Bohra sect of Musta'lī Islam, Syedna Qutubkhan Qutubuddin, was executed by Aurangzeb, then the governor of Gujarat, for heresy, on 27 Jumadil Akhir 1056 AH (1648 CE), at Ahmedabad.

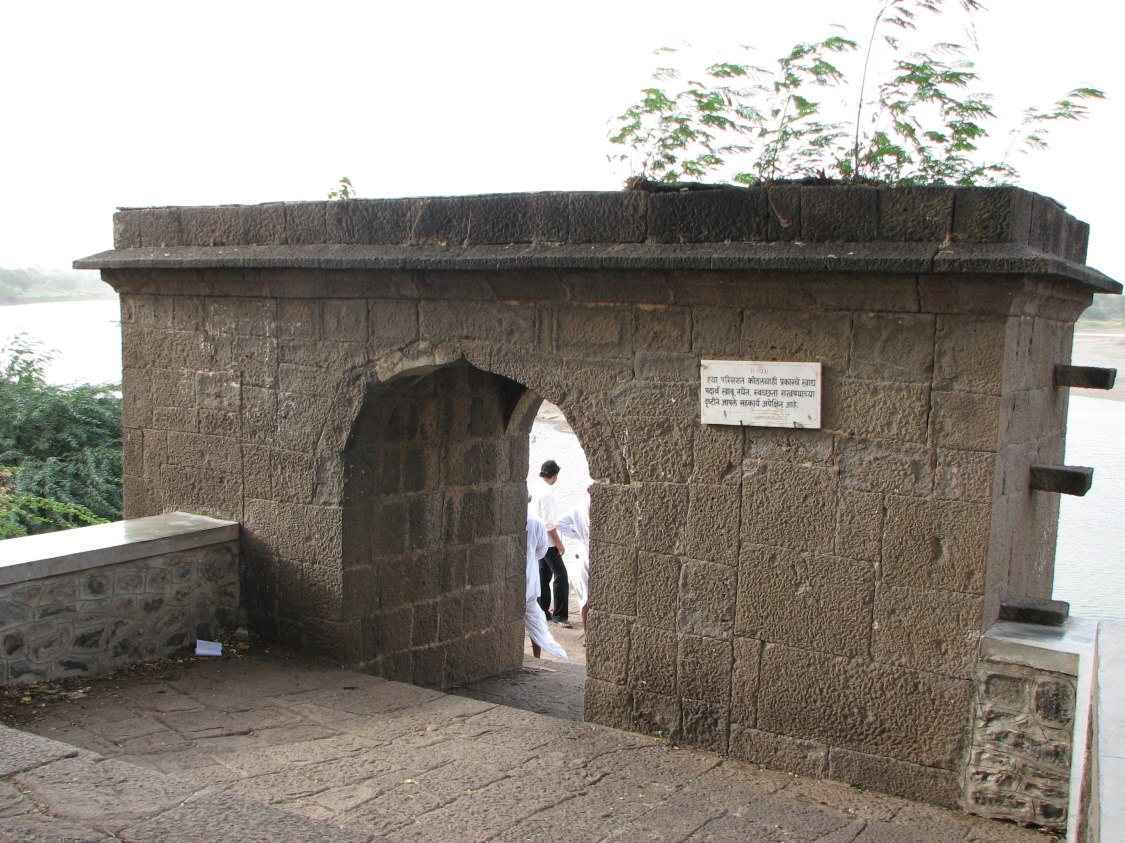
In 1689, according to Mughal accounts, Sambhaji was tried, found guilty, and executed.

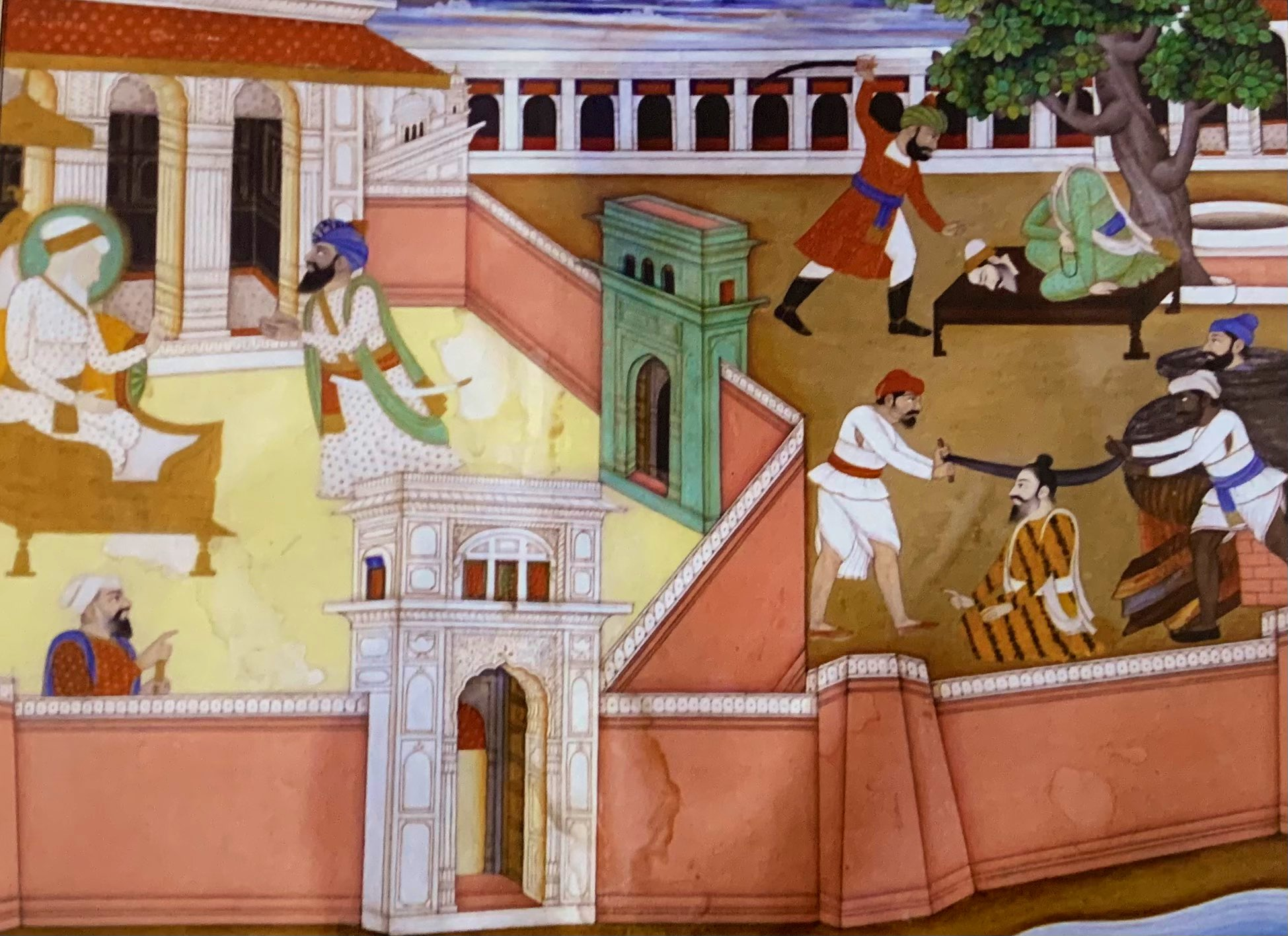
Guru Tegh Bahadur was publicly executed in 1675 on the orders of Aurangzeb in Delhi.

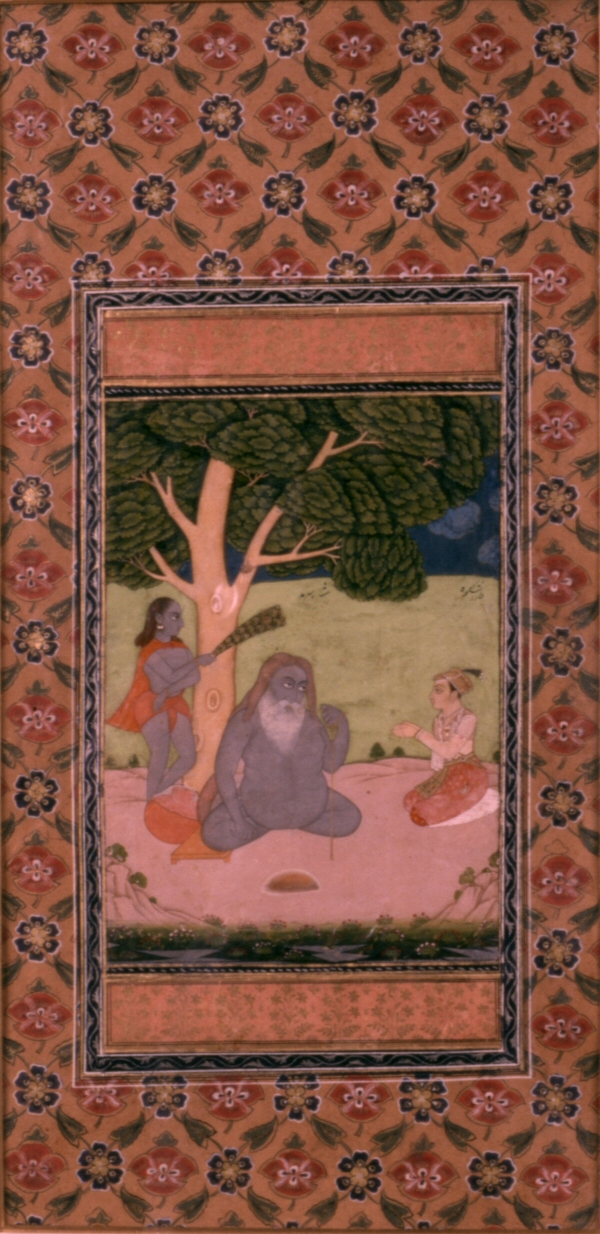
Sarmad Kashani, a Jewish convert to Islam and Sufi mystic was accused of heresy and executed.

=== Military ===
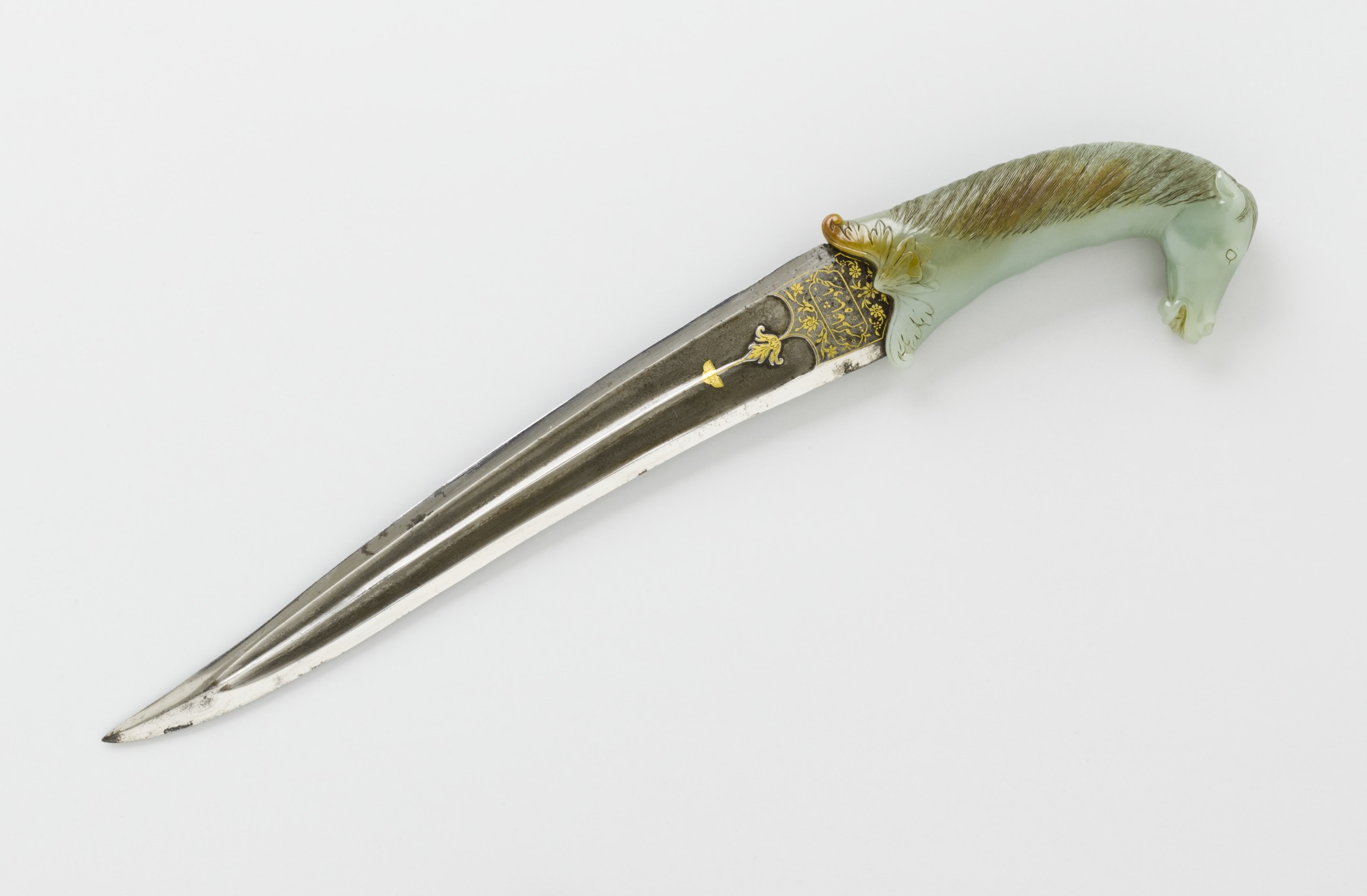
A dagger (Khanjar) of Aurangzeb (Badshah Alamgir).

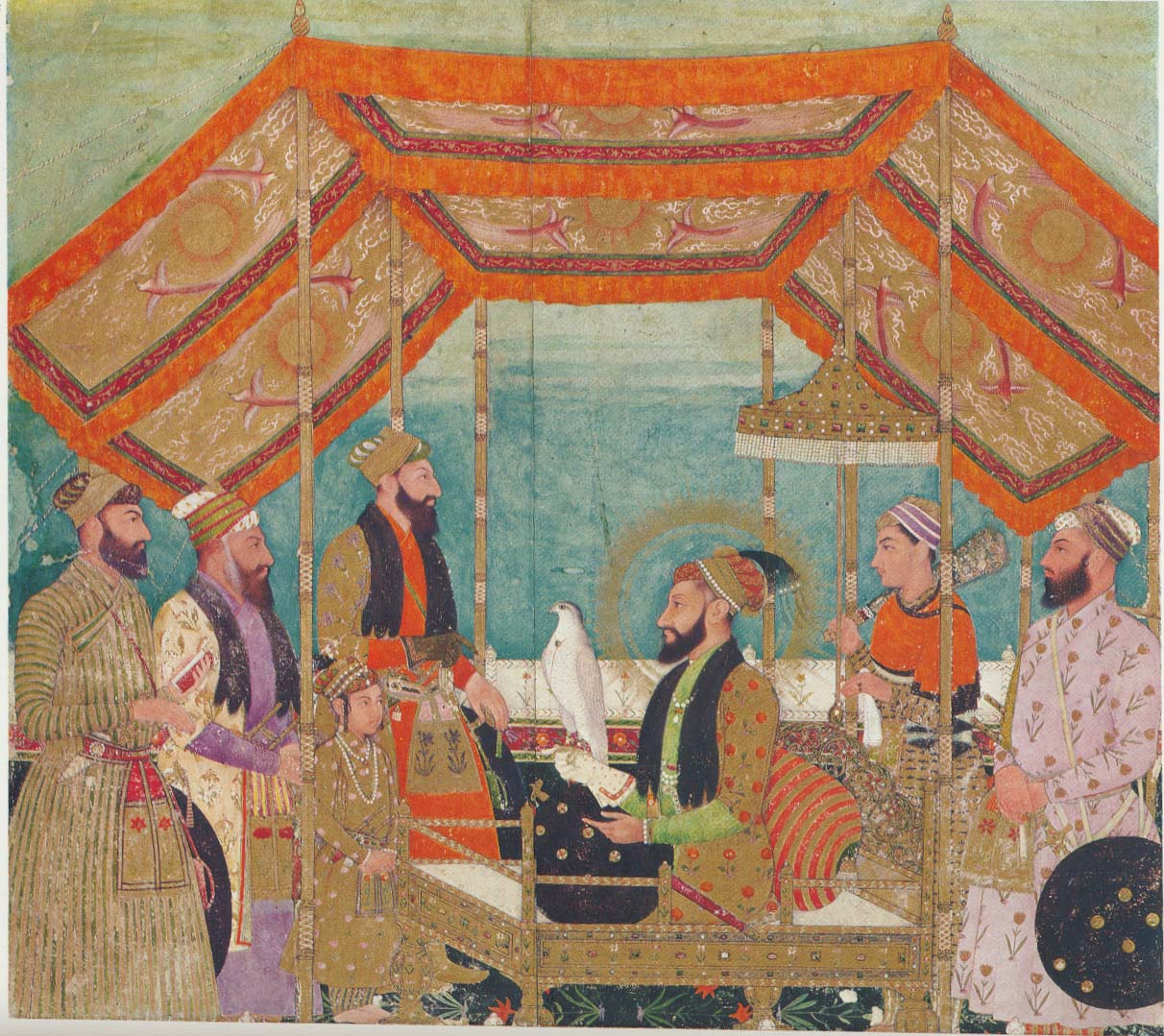
Darbar of Aurangzeb

It is reported that Aurangzeb inspected his cavalry contingents every day, during these inspections he used to test the cutlasses on sheep carcass, brought before him without the entrails and neatly bound up.

In 1663, during his visit to Ladakh, Aurangzeb established direct control over that part of the empire and loyal subjects such as Deldan Namgyal agreed to pledge tribute and loyalty. Deldan Namgyal is also known to have constructed a Grand Mosque in Leh, which he dedicated to Mughal rule.

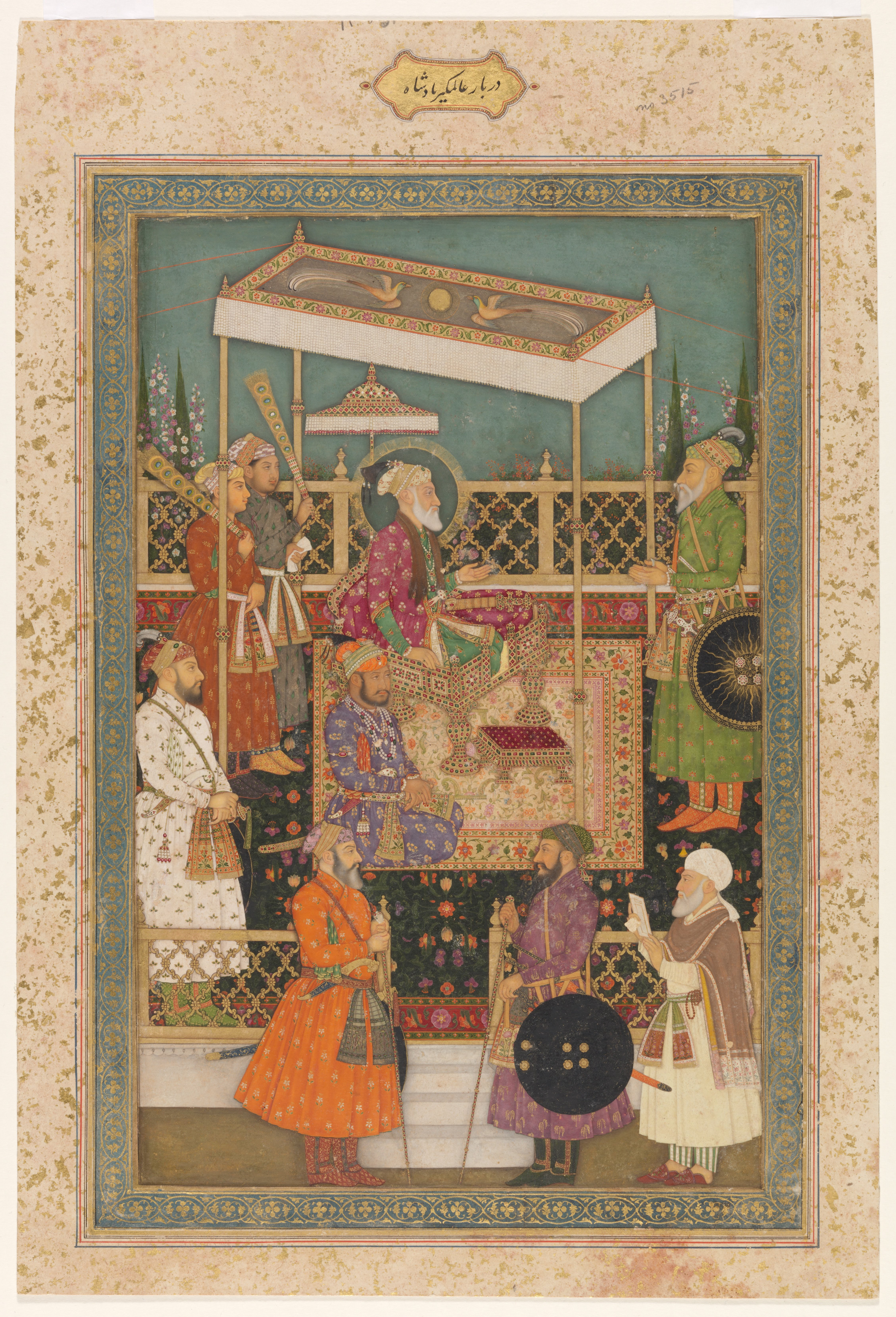
Aurangzeb Receives Prince Mu'azzam. Chester Beatty Library

In 1664, Aurangzeb appointed Shaista Khan the subedar (governor) of Bengal. Shaista Khan eliminated Portuguese and Arakanese pirates from the region, and in 1666 recaptured the port of Chittagong from the Arakanese king, Sanda Thudhamma. Chittagong remained a key port throughout Mughal rule.

In 1685, Aurangzeb dispatched his son, Muhammad Azam Shah, with a force of nearly 50,000 men to capture Bijapur Fort and defeat Sikandar Adil Shah (the ruler of Bijapur) who refused to be a vassal. The Mughals could not make any advancements upon Bijapur Fort, mainly because of the superior usage of cannon batteries on both sides. Outraged by the stalemate Aurangzeb himself arrived on 4 September 1686 and commanded the siege of Bijapur; after eight days of fighting, the Mughals were victorious.

Only Abul Hasan Qutb Shah (the Qutbshahi ruler of Golconda) refused to surrender. He and his servicemen fortified themselves at Golconda and fiercely protected the Kollur Mine, which was then probably the world's most productive diamond mine, and an important economic asset. In 1687, Aurangzeb led his grand Mughal army against the Deccan Qutbshahi fortress during the siege of Golconda. The Qutbshahis had constructed massive fortifications throughout successive generations on a granite hill over 400 ft high with an enormous eight-mile long wall enclosing the city. The main gates of Golconda had the ability to repulse any war elephant attack.

Although the Qutbshahis maintained the impregnability of their walls, at night Aurangzeb and his infantry erected complex scaffolding that allowed them to scale the high walls. During the eight-month siege the Mughals faced many hardships including the death of their experienced commander Kilich Khan Bahadur. Eventually, Aurangzeb and his forces managed to penetrate the walls by capturing a gate, and their entry into the fort led Abul Hasan Qutb Shah to surrender. He died after twelve years of Mughal imprisonment.

Mughal cannon making skills advanced during the 17th century. One of the most impressive Mughal cannons is known as the Zafarbaksh, which was a very rare composite cannon, that required skills in both wrought-iron forge welding and bronze-casting technologies and the in-depth knowledge of the qualities of both metals. The Ibrahim Rauza was a famed cannon, which was well known for its multi-barrels. François Bernier, the personal physician to Aurangzeb, observed Mughal gun-carriages each drawn by two horses, an improvement over the bullock-drawn gun-carriages used elsewhere in India.

During the rule of Aurangzeb, in 1703, the Mughal commander at Coromandel, Daud Khan Panni spent 10,500 coins to purchase 30 to 50 war elephants from Ceylon.

=== Art and culture ===
Aurangzeb was noted for his religious piety; he memorised the entire Quran, studied hadiths and stringently observed the rituals of Islam, and "transcribe[d] copies of the Quran."

Aurangzeb had a more austere nature than his predecessors, and greatly reduced imperial patronage of the figurative Mughal miniature.

==== Calligraphy ====
The Mughal Emperor Aurangzeb is known to have patronised works of Islamic calligraphy; the demand for Quran manuscripts in the naskh style peaked during his reign. Having been instructed by calligrapher Syed Ali Tabrizi, Aurangzeb was himself a talented calligrapher in naskh, evidenced by Quran manuscripts that he created.

==== Architecture ====
Aurangzeb was not as involved in architecture as his father. Under Aurangzeb's rule, the position of the Mughal Emperor as chief architectural patron began to diminish. However, Aurangzeb did endow some significant structures. Catherine Asher terms his architectural period as an "Islamisation" of Mughal architecture. One of the earliest constructions after his accession was a small marble mosque known as the Moti Masjid (Pearl Mosque), built for his personal use in the Red Fort complex of Delhi. He later ordered the construction of the Badshahi Mosque in Lahore, which is today one of the largest mosques in the Indian subcontinent. The mosque he constructed in Srinagar is still the largest in Kashmir. Aurangzeb had a palace constructed for himself in Aurangabad, which was extant till a few years ago.

Most of Aurangzeb's building activity revolved around mosques, but secular structures were not neglected. The Mubarak Manzil in Agra served as his riverside residence after his victory at Samugarh. The Bibi Ka Maqbara in Aurangabad, the mausoleum of Rabia-ud-Daurani, was constructed by his eldest son Azam Shah upon Aurangzeb's decree. Its architecture displays clear inspiration from the Taj Mahal. Aurangzeb also provided and repaired urban structures like fortifications (for example a wall around Aurangabad, many of whose gates still survive), bridges, caravanserais, and gardens.

Aurangzeb was more heavily involved in the repair and maintenance of previously existing structures. The most important of these were mosques, both Mughal and pre-Mughal, which he repaired more of than any of his predecessors. He patronised the dargahs of Sufi saints such as Bakhtiyar Kaki, and strived to maintain royal tombs.

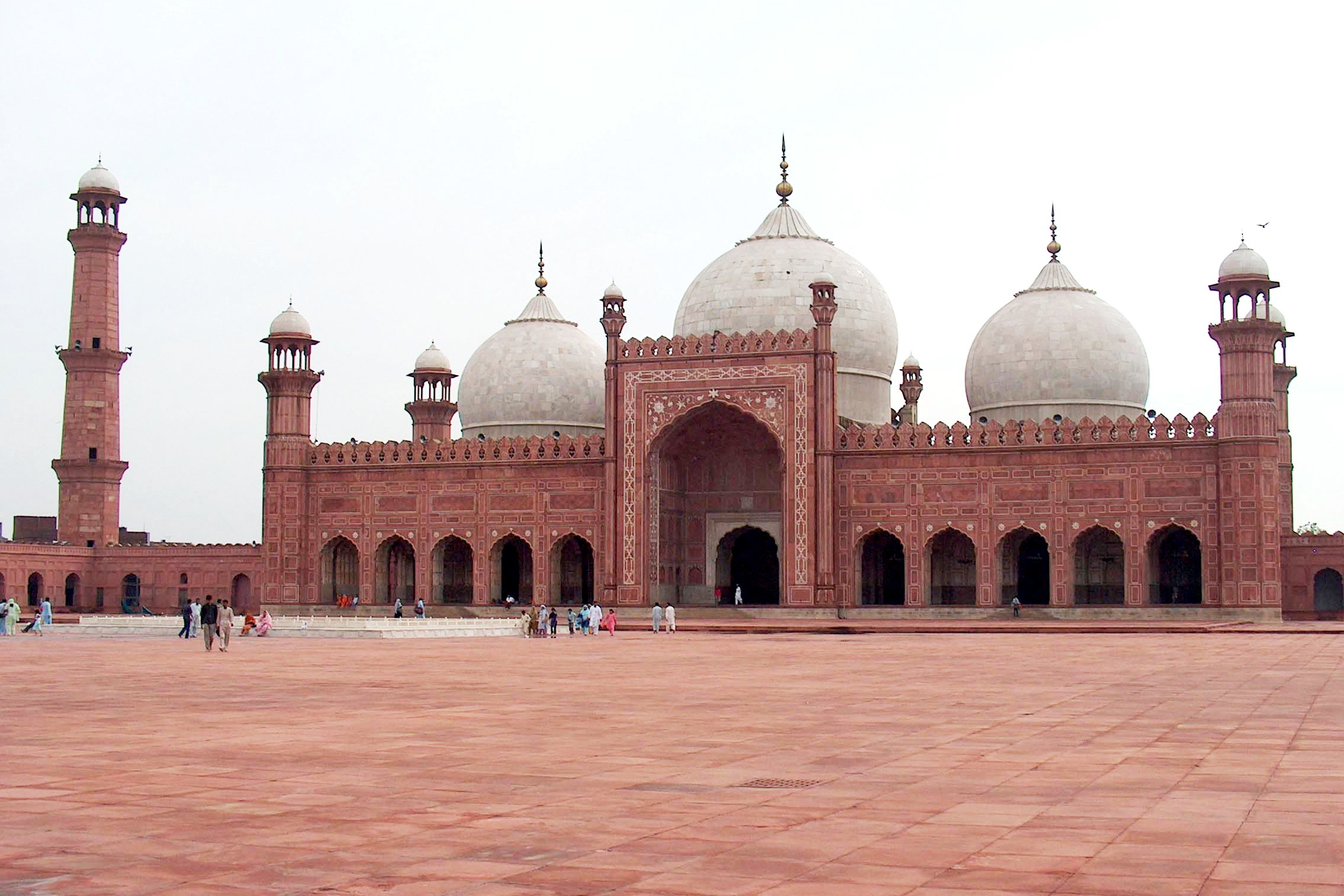
Seventeenth-century Badshahi Masjid built by Aurangzeb in Lahore.

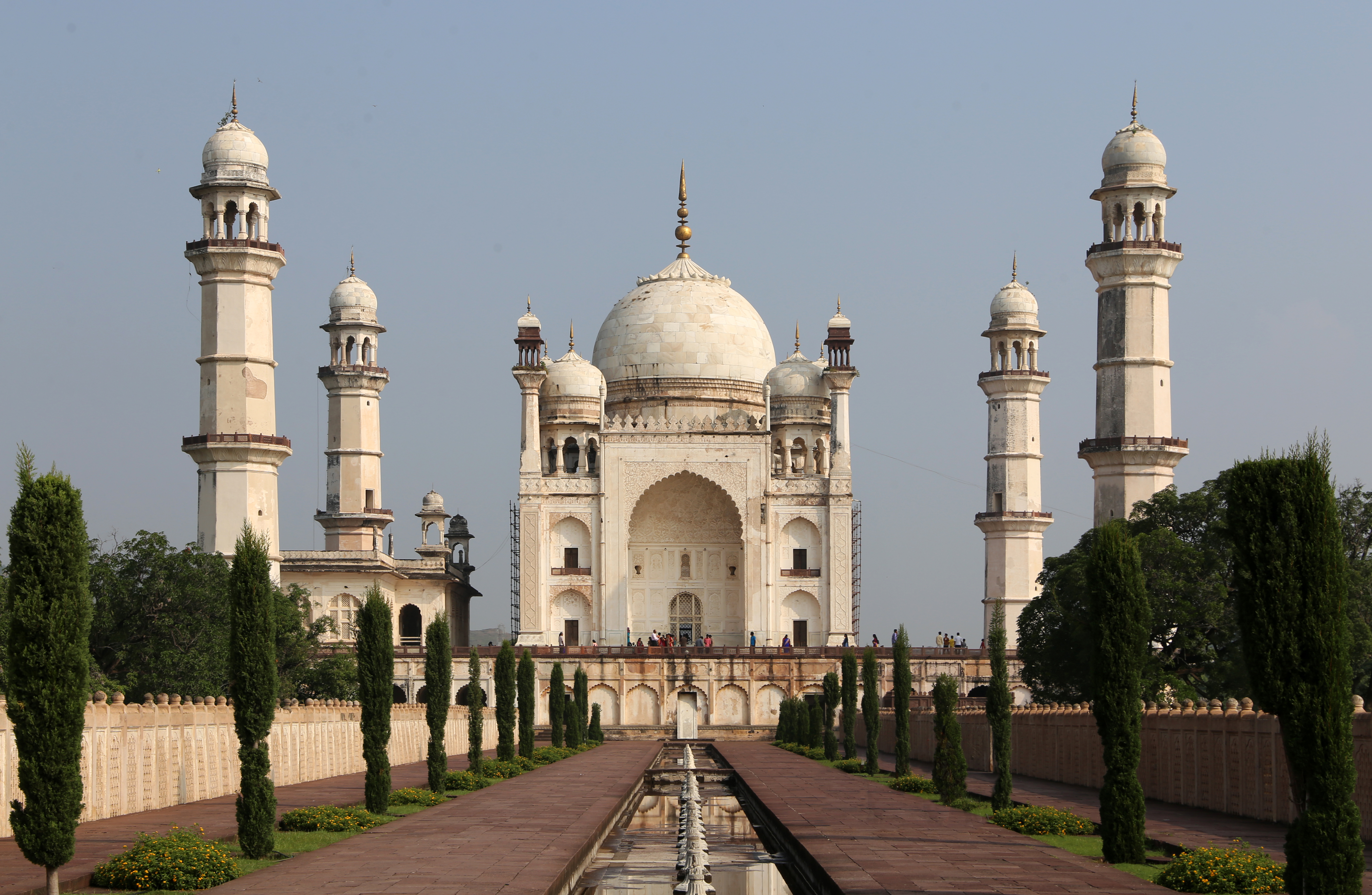
Bibi ka Maqbara.

==== Textiles ====
The textile industry in the Mughal Empire expanded greatly during the reign of the Mughal Emperor Aurangzeb and was noted by travellers. Francois Bernier writes how Karkanahs, or workshops for the artisans, particularly in textiles flourished by "employing hundreds of embroiderers, who were superintended by a master". He further writes how "Artisans manufacture of silk, fine brocade, and other fine muslins, of which are made turbans, robes of gold flowers, and tunics worn by females, so delicately fine as to wear out in one night, and cost even more if they were well embroidered with fine needlework".

He also explains the different techniques employed to produce such complicated textiles as Himru (whose name is Persian for "brocade"), Paithani (whose pattern is identical on both sides), Mushru (satin weave) and how Kalamkari, in which fabrics are painted or block-printed, was a technique that originally came from Persia. Francois Bernier provided some of the first, impressive descriptions of the designs and the soft, delicate texture of Pashmina shawls also known as Kani, which were very valued for their warmth and comfort among the Mughals, and how these textiles and shawls eventually began to find their way to France and England.

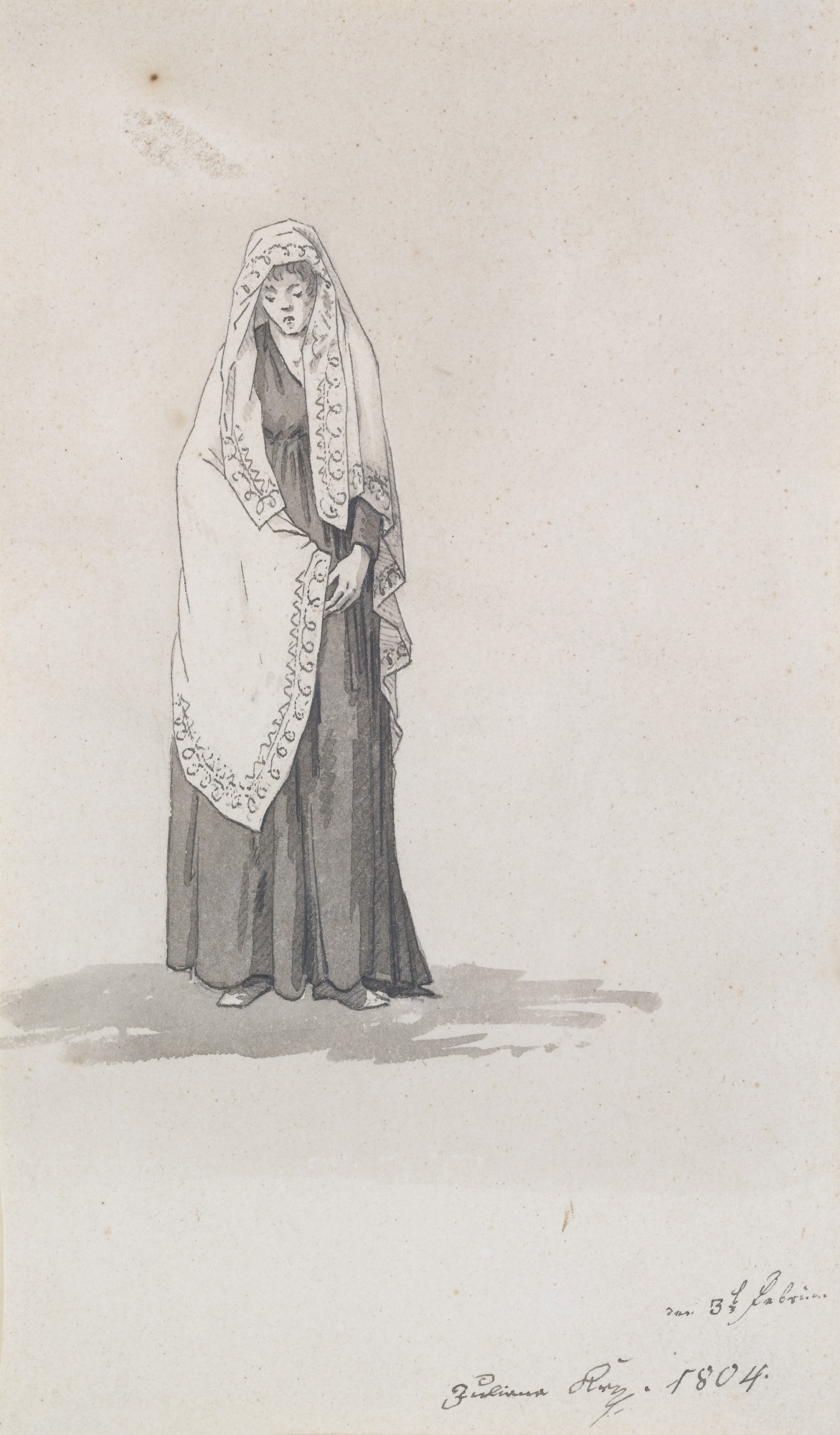
Shawls manufactured in the Mughal Empire had highly influenced other cultures around the world.

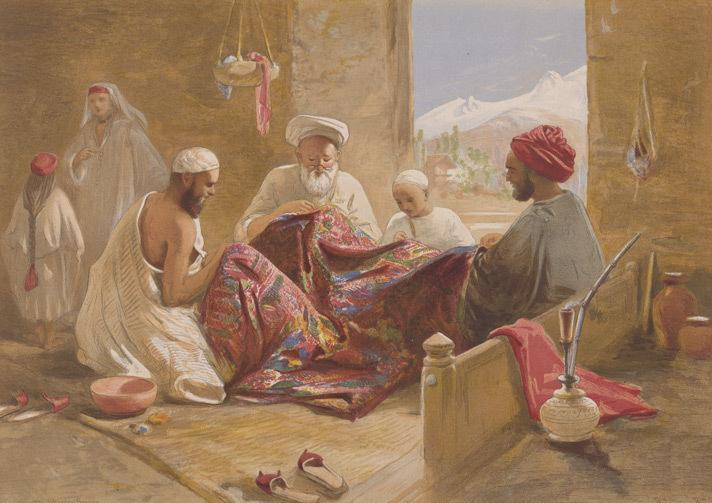
Shawl makers in the Mughal Empire.

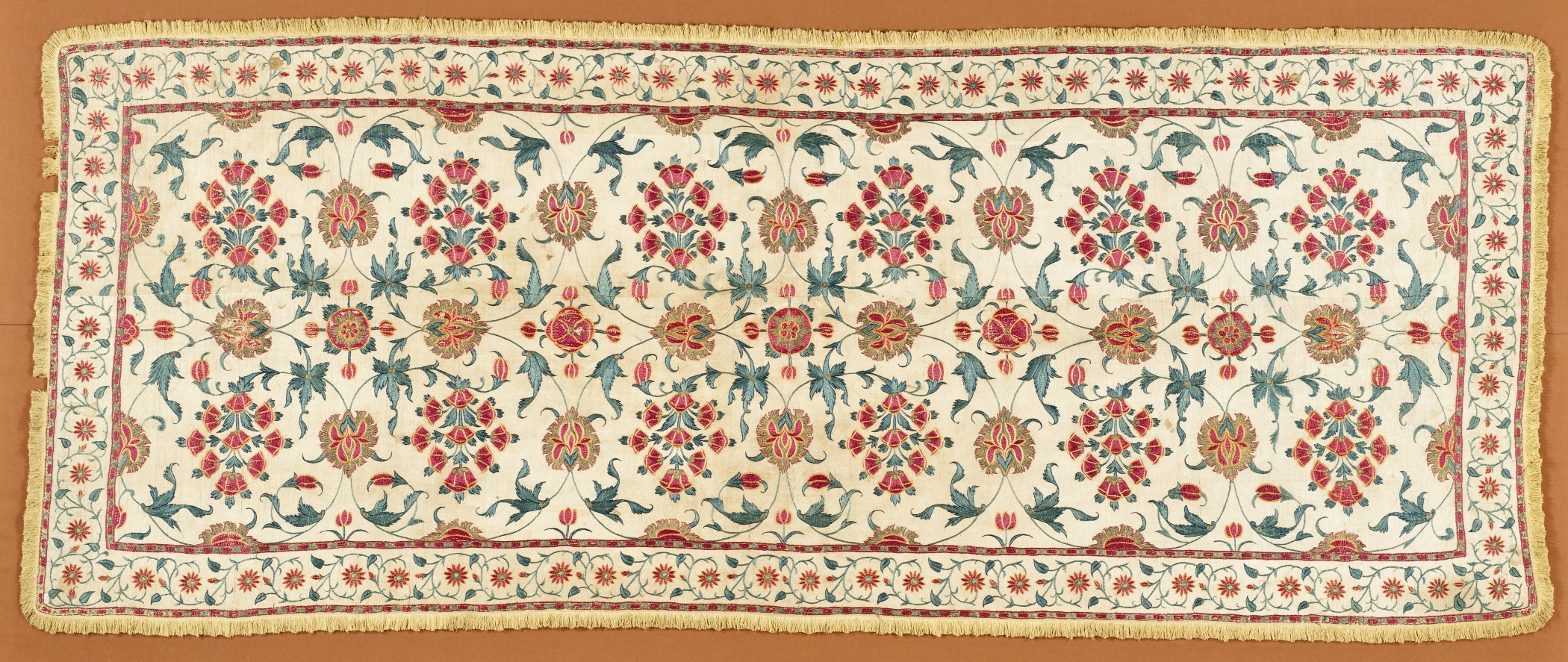
Mughal imperial carpet

=== Foreign relations ===
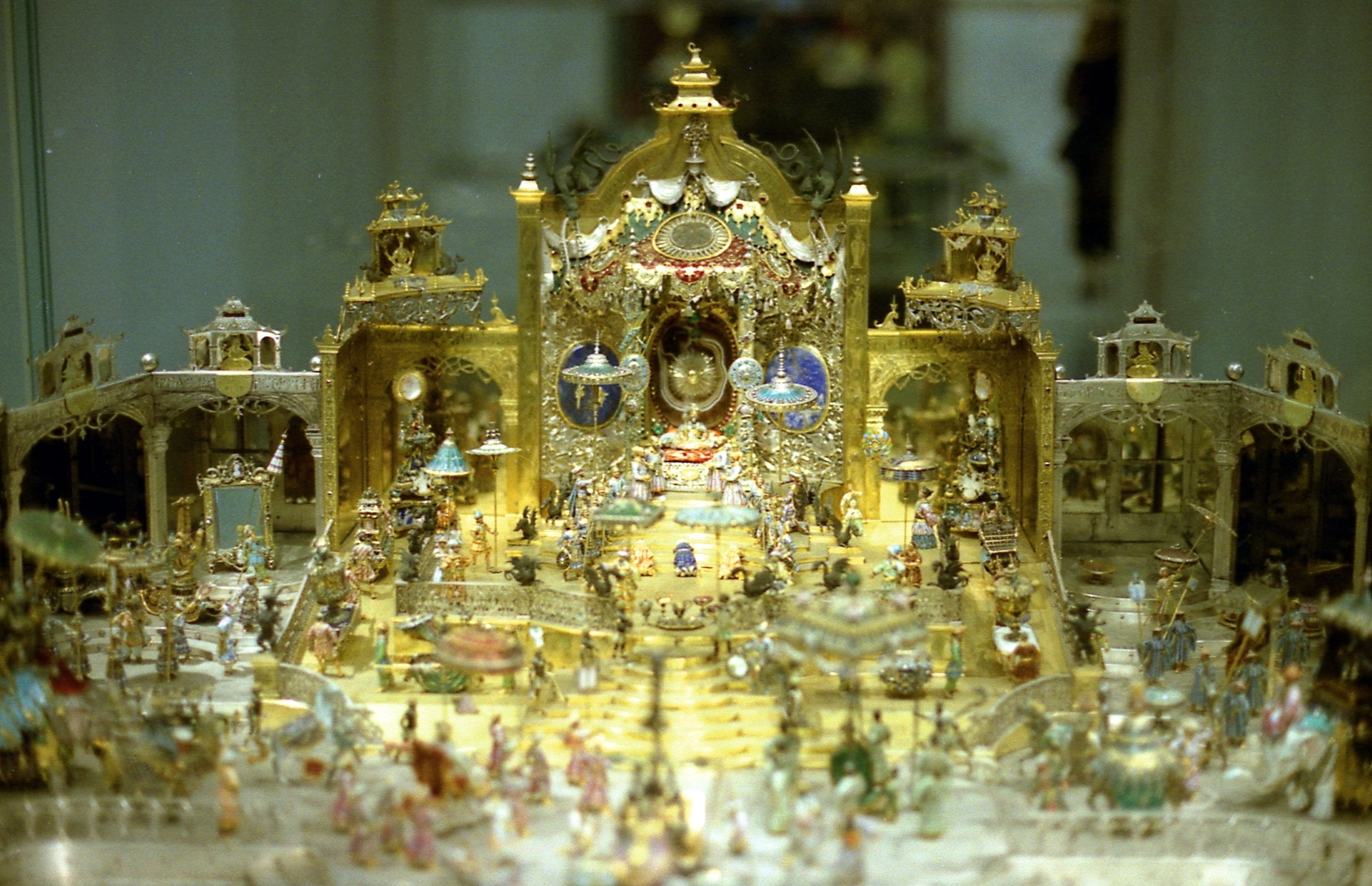
The Birthday of the Grand Mogul Aurangzeb, made 1701–1708 by Johann Melchior Dinglinger.

Aurangzeb sent diplomatic missions to Mecca in 1659 and 1662, with money and gifts for the Sharif. He also sent alms in 1666 and 1672 to be distributed in Mecca and Medina. Historian Naimur Rahman Farooqi writes that, "By 1694, Aurangzeb's ardour for the Sharifs of Mecca had begun to wane; their greed and rapacity had thoroughly disillusioned the Emperor ... Aurangzeb expressed his disgust at the unethical behavior of the Sharif who appropriated all the money sent to the Hijaz for his own use, thus depriving the needy and the poor." According to English traveller named John Fryar, Aurangzeb considered that despite his enormous power on land, it was cheaper to establish a reciprocal relation with the naval forces of the Portuguese empire, to secure the sea interest of ships in Mughal territory, so he did not built large naval forces.

==== Relations with Aceh ====
For decades, the Malabari Mappila Muslims which representing the Mughal empire are already patronised Aceh Sultanate. Aurangzeb, and his brother, Dara Shikoh, participated with Aceh trade and Aurangzeb himself also exchanging presents with the Sultan of Aceh in 1641. In that year, it is recorded the daughter of Iskandar Muda, Sultanah Safiatuddin, has presented Aurangzeb with eight elephants.

When the VOC, or Dutch East India Company trying to disrupt the trade in Aceh to make their own Malaka trade lucrative, Aurangzeb threatened the Dutch with retaliation against any losses in Gujarat due to Dutch intervention. This effort were caused due to VOC realisation that Muslim tradings were damaging to the VOC. The Firman issued by Aurangzeb caused the VOC to back down and allowed Indian sailors to pass into Aceh, Perak, and Kedah, without any restrictions.

==== Relations with the Uzbek ====
Subhan Quli Khan, Balkh's Uzbek ruler was the first to recognise him in 1658 and requested for a general alliance, he worked alongside the new Mughal Emperor since 1647, when Aurangzeb was the Subedar of Balkh.

==== Relations with the Safavid dynasty ====
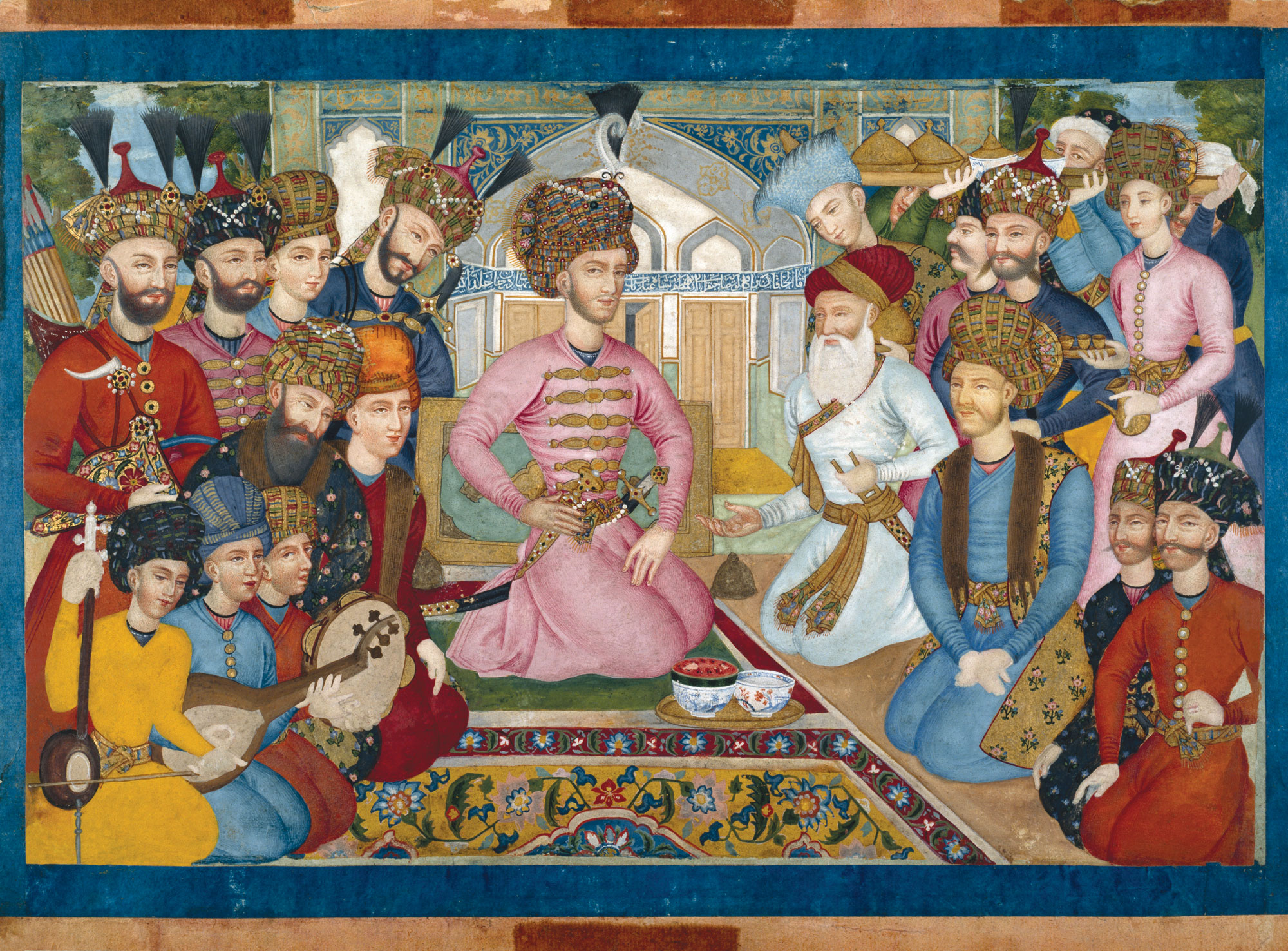
Abbas II negotiating with the Mughal ambassador.

Safavid Iran and the Mughal Empire had long clashed over Kandahar, an outpost on the distant frontier of their two empires. Control of the city swung back and forth. Aurangzeb led two unsuccessful campaigns to recapture it 1649 and 1652. Mughal attempts died down after 1653 amidst internal rivalries.

Upon ascending the throne, Aurangzeb was eager to obtain diplomatic recognition from the Safavids to bolster the legitimacy of his rule. Abbas II of Persia sent an embassy in 1661. Aurangzeb received the ambassador warmly and they exchanged gifts. A return embassy sent by Aurangzeb to Persia in 1664 was poorly treated. Tensions over Kandahar rose again. There were cross border raids, but hostilities subsided after Abbas II's death in 1666.

Aurangzeb's rebellious son, Prince Akbar, sought refuge with Suleiman I of Persia. Suleiman rescued him from the Imam of Musqat, but refused to assist him in any military adventures against Aurangzeb.

==== Relations with the French ====
In 1667, the French East India Company ambassadors Le Gouz and Bebert presented Louis XIV's letter which urged the protection of French merchants from various rebels in the Deccan. In response to the letter, Aurangzeb issued a firman allowing the French to open a factory in Surat.

Avreng-zebe, Roy Des Indes (Aurangzeb, King of the Indies) by Nicolas II de Larmessin

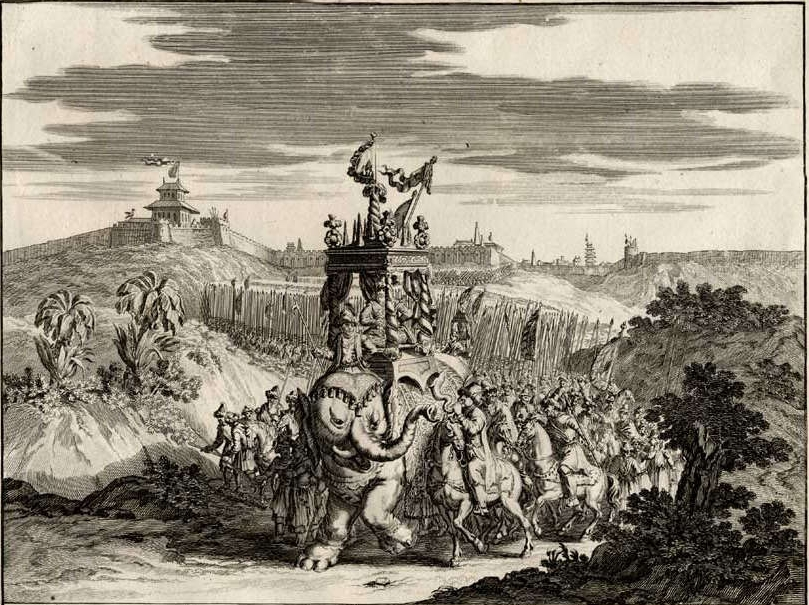
March of the Great Moghul (Aurangzeb)

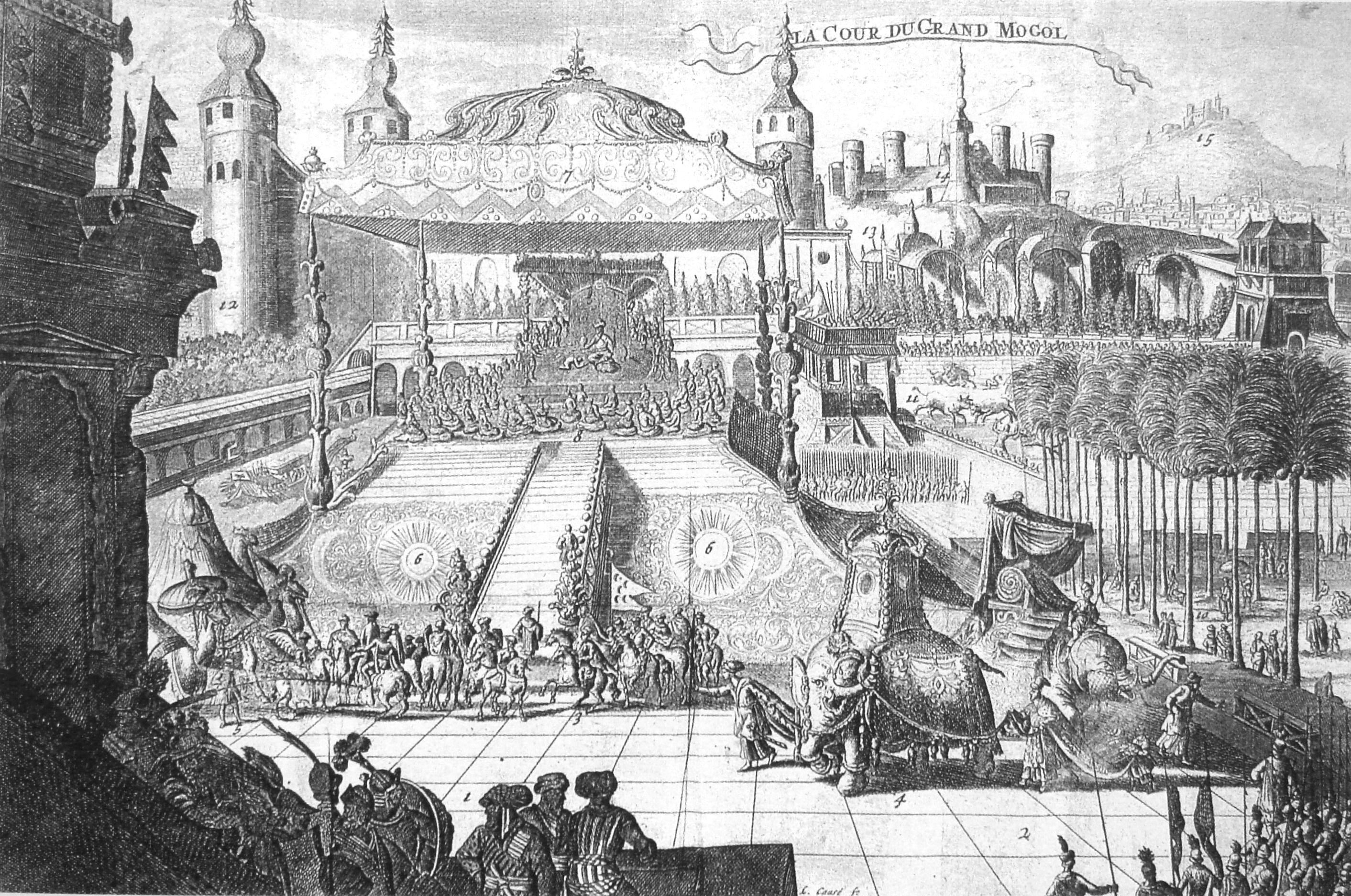
François Bernier, was a French physician and traveller, who for 12 years was the personal physician of Aurangzeb. He described his experiences in Travels in the Mughal Empire.

==== Relations with the Sultanate of Maldives ====
In the 1660s, the Sultan of the Maldives, Ibrahim Iskandar I, requested help from Aurangzeb's representative, the Faujdar of Balasore. The Sultan wished to gain his support in possible future expulsions of Dutch and English trading ships, as he was concerned with how they might impact the economy of the Maldives. However, as Aurangzeb did not possess a powerful navy and had no interest in providing support to Ibrahim in a possible future war with the Dutch or English, the request came to nothing.

==== Relations with the Ottoman Empire ====
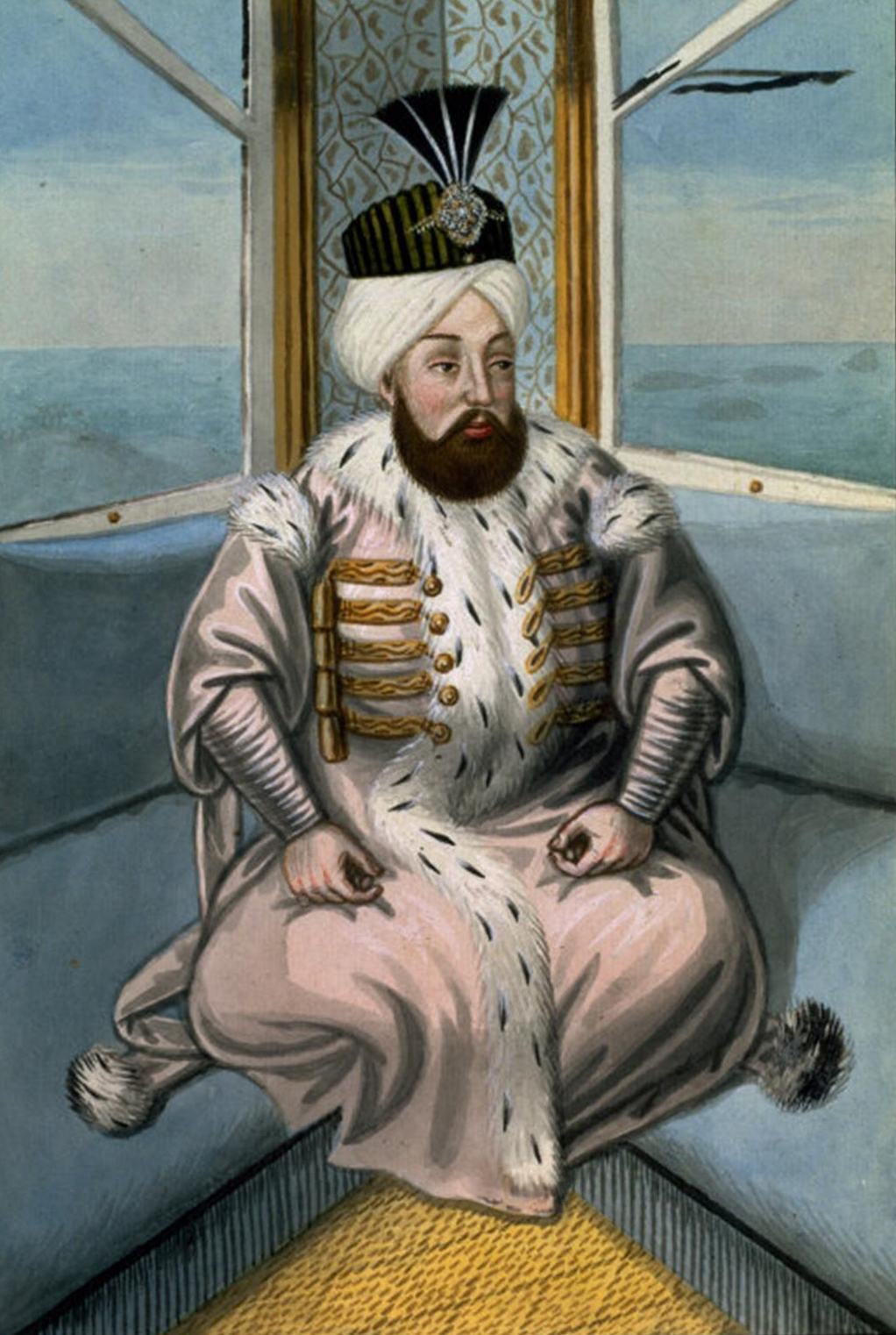
Suleiman II

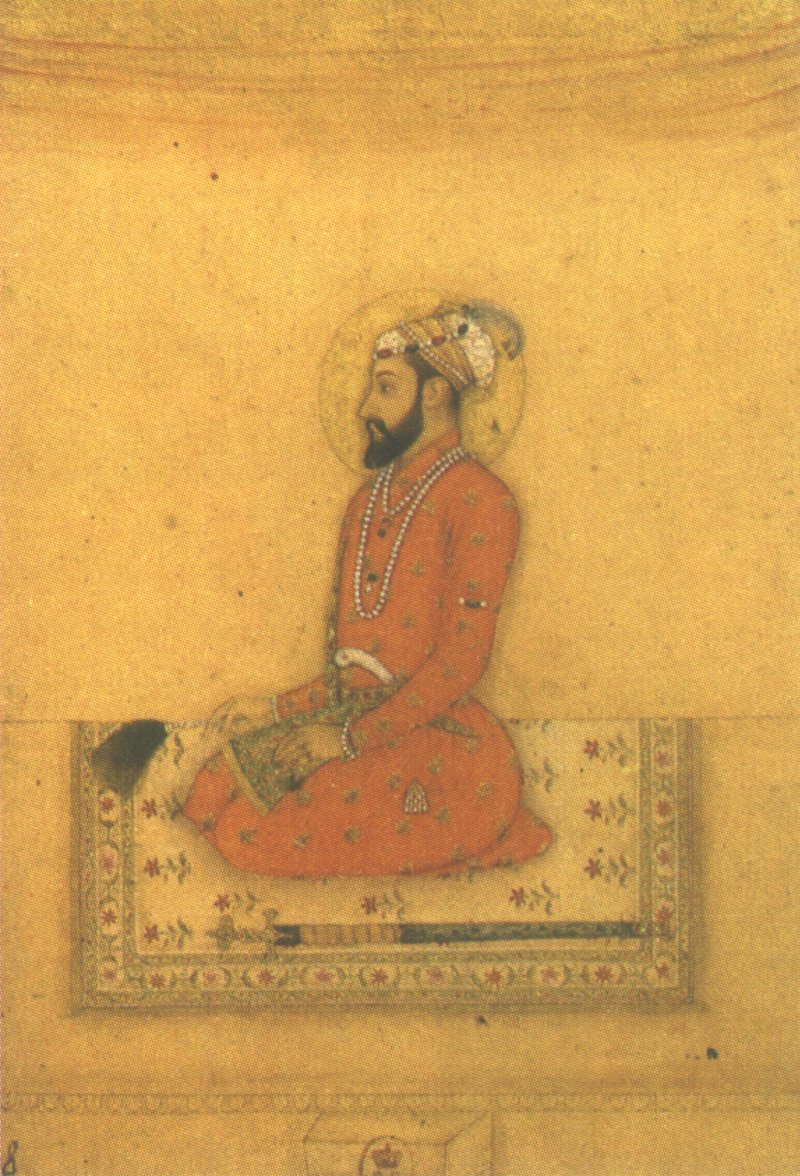
Alamgir I

Like his father, Aurangzeb was not willing to acknowledge the Ottoman claim to the caliphate. He often supported the Ottoman Empire's enemies, extending cordial welcome to two rebel Governors of Basra, and granting them and their families a high status in the imperial service. Sultan Suleiman II's friendly postures were ignored by Aurangzeb. The Sultan urged Aurangzeb to wage holy war against Christians. However, Aurangzeb were granted as patron of Sharif of Mecca, and sending the Sherif at that time with richly laden mission, which at that time were under the jurisdiction of Ottoman.

==== Relations with the English and the Anglo-Mughal War ====
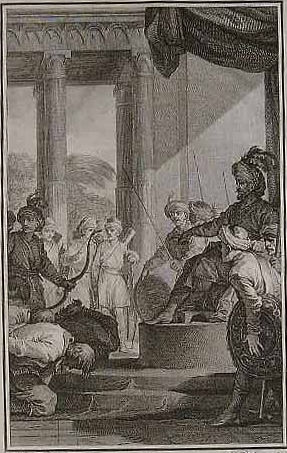
Josiah Child requests a pardon from Aurangzeb during the Anglo-Mughal war (1686–1690).

In 1686, the East India Company, which had unsuccessfully tried to obtain a firman that would grant them regular trading privileges throughout the Mughal Empire, initiated the Anglo-Mughal War. This war ended in disaster for the English after Aurangzeb in 1689 dispatched a large fleet from Janjira that blockaded Bombay. The ships, commanded by Sidi Yaqub, were manned by Indians and Mappila. In 1690, realising the war was not going favourably for them, the Company sent envoys to Aurangzeb's camp to plead for a pardon. The company's envoys prostrated themselves before the emperor, agreed pay a large indemnity, and promise to refrain from such actions in the future.

In September 1695, English pirate Henry Every conducted one of the most profitable pirate raids in history with his capture of a Grand Mughal grab convoy near Surat. The Indian ships had been returning home from their annual pilgrimage to Mecca when the pirate struck, capturing the Ganj-i-Sawai, reportedly the largest ship in the Muslim fleet, and its escorts in the process. When news of the capture reached the mainland, a livid Aurangzeb nearly ordered an armed attack against the English-governed city of Bombay, though he finally agreed to compromise after the Company promised to pay financial reparations, estimated at 600,000 rupees by the Mughal authorities.

Letter from William III to Aurangzeb, 1 January 1699

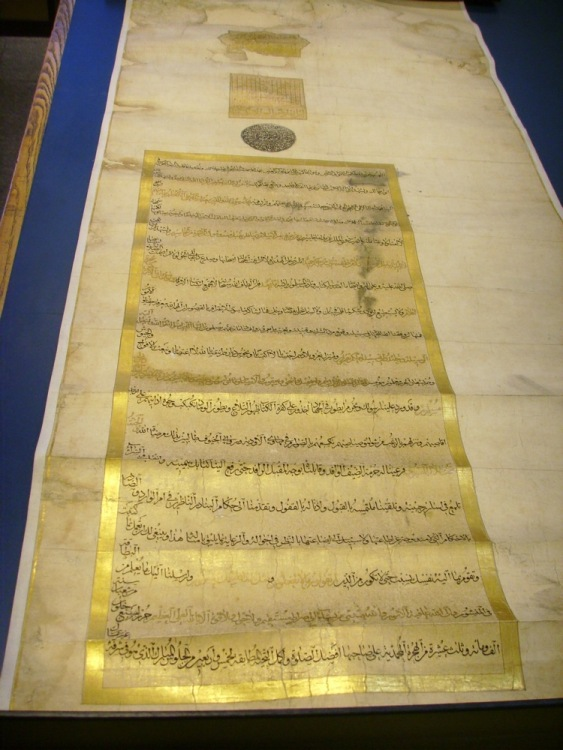
Letter from Aurangzeb to William III, 7 January 1702

Meanwhile, Aurangzeb shut down four of the English East India Company's factories, imprisoned the workers and captains (who were nearly lynched by a rioting mob), and threatened to put an end to all English trading in India until Every was captured. The Lords Justices of England offered a bounty for Every's apprehension, leading to the first worldwide manhunt in recorded history. However, Every successfully eluded capture.

In 1702, Aurangzeb sent Daud Khan Panni, the Mughal Empire's Subhedar of the Carnatic region, to besiege and blockade Fort St. George for more than three months. The governor of the fort Thomas Pitt was instructed by the East India Company to sue for peace.

==== Relations with the Ethiopian Empire ====
Ethiopian Emperor Fasilides dispatched an embassy to India in 1664–65 to congratulate Aurangzeb upon his accession to the throne of the Mughal Empire. The delegation reportedly presented several valuable offerings to the Mughal Emperor, such as slaves, ivory, horses, a set of intricately adorned silver pocket pistols, a zebra and various other exotic gifts. François Bernier, describes the presents as consisting of:

:"twenty-five choice slaves, nine or ten of whom were of a tender age and in a state to be made eunuchs [...]; fifteen horses, esteemed equal to those of Arabia, and a species of mule, whose skin I have seen: no tiger is so beautifully marked, and no alacha [a piece of cloth] of the Indies, or stripped silken stuff, is more finely and variously streaked; a couple of elephant's teeth [i. e. tusks], of a size so prodigious that it required, it seems, the utmost exertion of a strong man to lift either of them from the ground; and lastly, the horn of an ox, filled with civet, which was indeed enormously large, for I measured the mouth of it at Delhy, and found that it exceeded half a foot in diameter"

==== Relations with the Tibetans, Uyghurs, and Dzungars ====
After 1679, the Tibetans invaded Ladakh, which was in the Mughal sphere of influence. Aurangzeb intervened on Ladakh's behalf in 1683, but his troops retreated before Dzungar reinforcements arrived to bolster the Tibetan position. At the same time, however, a letter was sent from the governor of Kashmir claiming the Mughals had defeated the Dalai Lama and conquered all of Tibet, a cause for celebration in Aurangzeb's court.

Aurangzeb received an embassy from Muhammad Amin Khan of Chagatai Moghulistan in 1690, seeking assistance in driving out "Qirkhiz infidels" (meaning the Buddhist Dzungars), who "had acquired dominance over the country".

==== Relations with the Czardom of Russia ====
Russian Czar Peter the Great requested Aurangzeb to open Russo-Mughal trade relations in the late 17th century. In 1696 Aurangzeb received his envoy, Semyon Malenkiy, and allowed him to conduct free trade. After staying for six years in India, and visiting Surat, Burhanpur, Agra, Delhi and other cities, Russian merchants returned to Moscow with valuable Indian goods.

== Rebellions ==
Traditional and newly coherent social groups in northern and western India, such as the Marathas, Rajputs, Hindu Jats, Pashtuns, and Sikhs, gained military and governing ambitions during Mughal rule, which, through collaboration or opposition, gave them both recognition and military experience.

- In 1669, the Hindu Jat peasants of Bharatpur around Mathura rebelled but were defeated.
- In 1659, Maratha leader Shivaji launched a surprise attack on the Mughal Viceroy Shaista Khan and, while waging war against Aurangzeb, Shivaji and his forces attacked the Deccan, Janjira and Surat and tried to gain control of vast territories. In 1689, Aurangzeb's armies captured Shivaji's son Sambhaji and executed him. But the Marathas continued to fight.
- In 1679, the Rathore clan under the command of Durgadas Rathore of Marwar rebelled when Aurangzeb did not give permitted the young Rathore prince to become the king, and took control of Jodhpur. This incident caused great unrest among the Hindu Rajput rulers under Aurangzeb and led to several rebellions in Rajputana, resulting in the loss of Mughal power in the region and religious bitterness over the destruction of temples.
- In 1672, the Satnami, a sect concentrated in an area near Delhi, under the leadership of Bhirbhan, took over the administration of Narnaul, but were eventually crushed upon Aurangzeb's personal intervention with very few escaping alive.
- In 1671, the battle of Saraighat was fought in the easternmost regions of the Mughal Empire against the Ahom Kingdom. The Mughals led by Mir Jumla II and Shaista Khan were defeated by the Ahoms.
- Maharaja Chhatrasal of the Bundela Rajput clan also fought against the Mughal Emperor Aurangzeb, and established his own kingdom in Bundelkhand, becoming maharaja of Panna.

=== Jat rebellion ===
In 1669, Hindu Jats began to organise a rebellion that is believed to have been caused by the re-imposition of jizya and destruction of Hindu temples in Mathura. The Jats were led by Gokula, a rebel landholder from Tilpat. By the year 1670 20,000 Jat rebels were quelled and the Mughal Army took control of Tilpat, Gokula's personal fortune amounted to 93,000 gold coins and hundreds of thousands of silver coins.

Gokula was caught and executed. But the Jats once again attempted rebellion. Raja Ram Jat, in order to avenge his father Gokula's death, plundered Akbar's tomb of its gold, silver and fine carpets, opened Akbar's grave and dragged his bones and burned them in retaliation. Jats also shot off the tops of the minarets on the gateway to Akbar's Tomb and melted down two silver doors from the Taj Mahal. Aurangzeb appointed Mohammad Bidar Bakht as commander to crush the Jat rebellion. On 4 July 1688, Raja Ram Jat was captured and beheaded. His head was sent to Aurangzeb as a proof of his death.

Due to the Jat rebellion, the temples of Pushtimarg, Gaudiya, and Radha vallabh Vaishnavs in Braj were abandoned and their icons were taken to different regions or into hiding.

=== Mughal–Maratha Wars ===
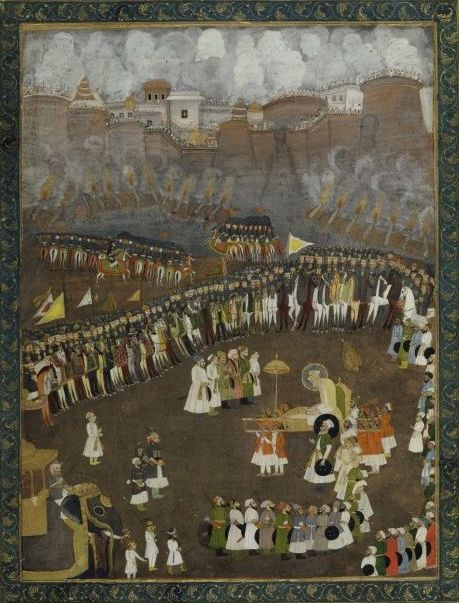
Aurangzeb leads the Mughal Army during the battle of Satara.

In 1657, while Aurangzeb invaded Golconda and Bijapur in the Deccan, the Hindu Maratha warrior, Shivaji, used guerrilla tactics to take control of three Adil Shahi forts formerly under his father's command. With these victories, Shivaji assumed defacto leadership of many independent Maratha clans. The Marathas harried the flanks of the warring Adil Shahis, gaining weapons, forts, and territory. Shivaji's small and ill-equipped army survived an all out Adil Shahi attack, and Shivaji personally killed the Adil Shahi general, Afzal Khan. With this event, the Marathas transformed into a powerful military force, capturing more and more Adil Shahi territories. Shivaji went on to neutralise Mughal power in the region.

In 1659, Aurangzeb sent his trusted general and maternal uncle Shaista Khan, the wali in Golconda to recover forts lost to the Maratha rebels. Shaista Khan drove into Maratha territory and took up residence in Pune. But in a raid on the governor's palace in Pune during a midnight wedding celebration, led by Shivaji himself, the Marathas killed Shaista Khan's son and Shivaji maimed Shaista Khan by cutting off three fingers of his hand. Shaista Khan, however, survived and was re-appointed the administrator of Bengal, going on to become a key commander in the war against the Ahoms.

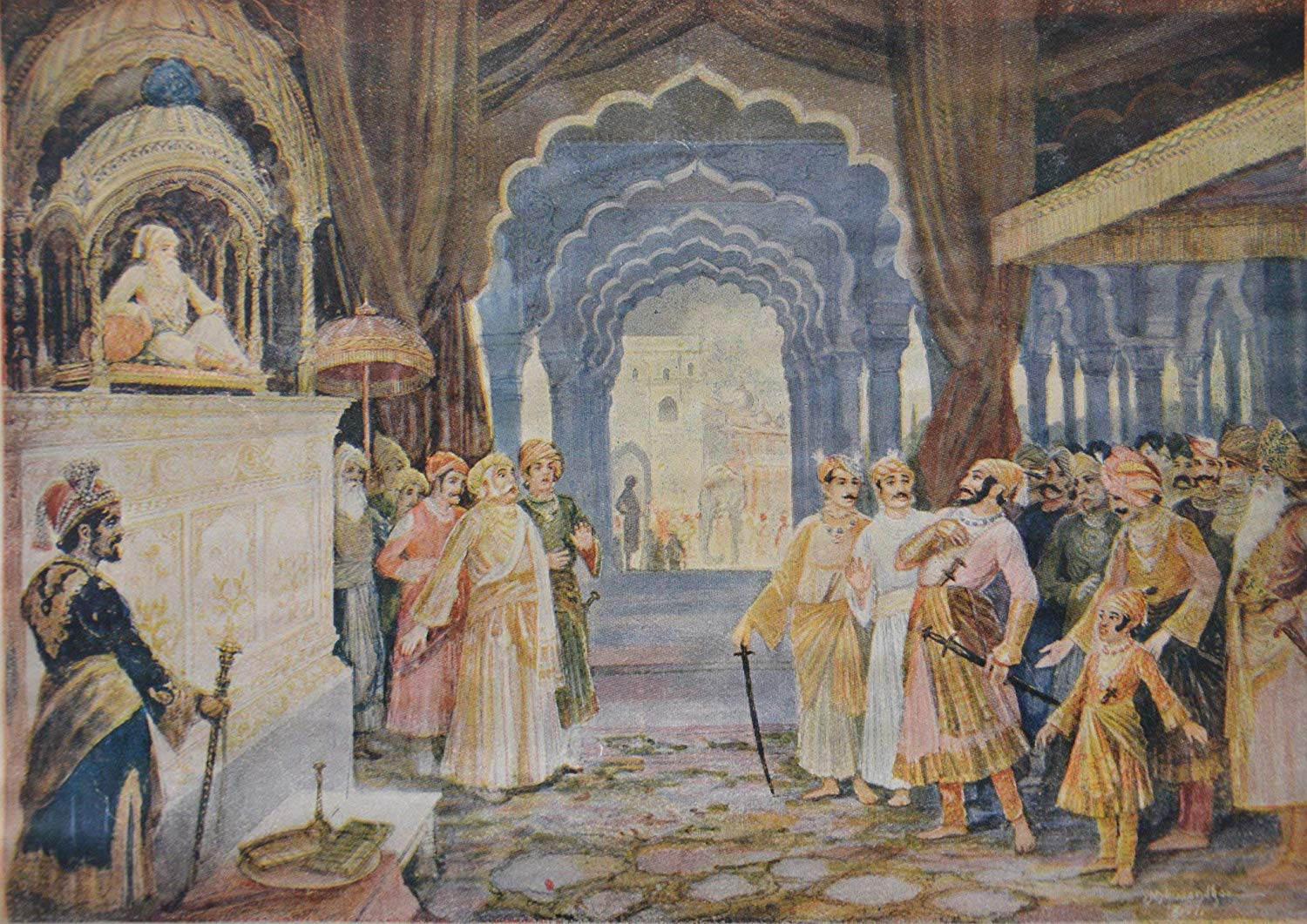
Raja Shivaji at Aurangzeb's Darbar by M. V. Dhurandhar

Aurangzeb next sent general Raja Jai Singh to vanquish the Marathas. Jai Singh besieged the fort of Purandar and fought off all attempts to relieve it. Foreseeing defeat, Shivaji agreed to terms. Jai Singh persuaded Shivaji to visit Aurangzeb at Agra, giving him a personal guarantee of safety. During their meeting, Shivaji was not satisfied with how he was received, and refused imperial service. For his refusal, Shivaji was detained but eventually escaped his capture.

After Shivaji's escape, hostilities with the Mughals ebbed. In April 1667, Shivaji wrote a letter offering his submission again, along with the induction of his son into imperial service.

Aurangzeb ignored this letter, forcing Shivaji to enlist the help of Jaswant Singh of Marwar to communicate with the emperor. After Muazzam and Jaswant Singh recommended Shivaji to Aurangzeb, his submission was accepted and he was conferred the title of “Raja". However Aurangzeb did not restore his right over the forts.

Sambhaji was also restored as a Mughal mansabdar with 5,000 horses. At that time Shivaji sent Sambhaji and General Prataprao Gujar, to serve with Prince Mu'azzam, the Mughal viceroy in Aurangabad. Sambhaji was also granted territory in Berar for revenue collection. Aurangzeb also permitted Shivaji to attack Bijapur, ruled by the decaying Adil Shahi dynasty; the weakened Sultan Ali Adil Shah II sued for peace and granted the rights of sardeshmukhi and chauthai to Shivaji.

Aurangzeb's third son Akbar left the Mughal court along with a few Muslim Mansabdar supporters and joined Muslim rebels in the Deccan. Aurangzeb in response moved his court to Aurangabad and took over command of the Deccan campaign. The rebels were defeated and Akbar fled south to seek refuge with Sambhaji, Shivaji's successor. After several battles Akbar fled to Persia, never to return.

In 1689, Aurangzeb's forces captured and executed Sambhaji. His successor Rajaram, later Rajaram's widow Tarabai and their Maratha forces fought individual battles against the forces of the Mughal Empire. Territory changed hands repeatedly during the years (1689–1707) of interminable warfare. As there was no central authority among the Marathas, Aurangzeb was forced to contest every inch of territory, at great cost in lives and money.

The Marathas shifted tactics, avoiding set battles in favour of conducting a hit-and-run insurgency. Even as Aurangzeb drove west, deep into Maratha territory – notably conquering Satara – the Marathas expanded eastwards into Mughal lands – Malwa and Hyderabad. The Marathas also expanded further South into Southern India defeating the independent local rulers there capturing Jinji in Tamil Nadu. Aurangzeb waged continuous war in the Deccan for more than two decades with no resolution. He lost about a fifth of his army fighting rebellions led by the Marathas in Deccan. Aurangzeb travelled a long distance to the Deccan to subdue the Marathas and died at the age of 88 during the campaign.

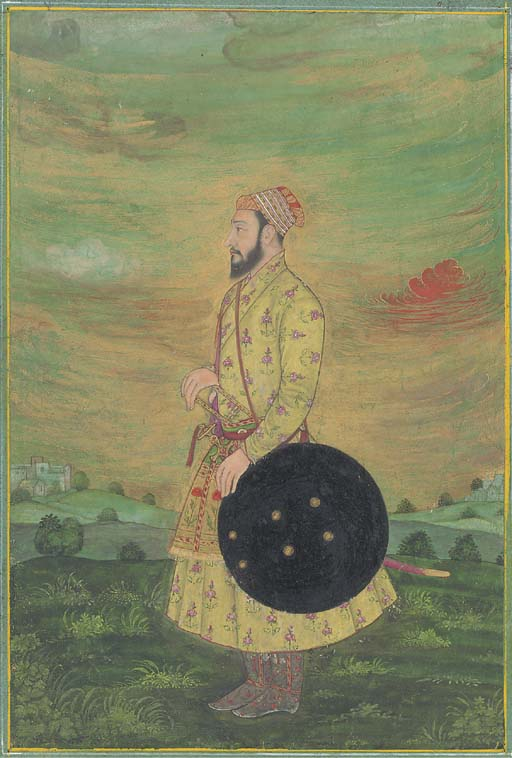
A Mughal trooper in the Deccan.

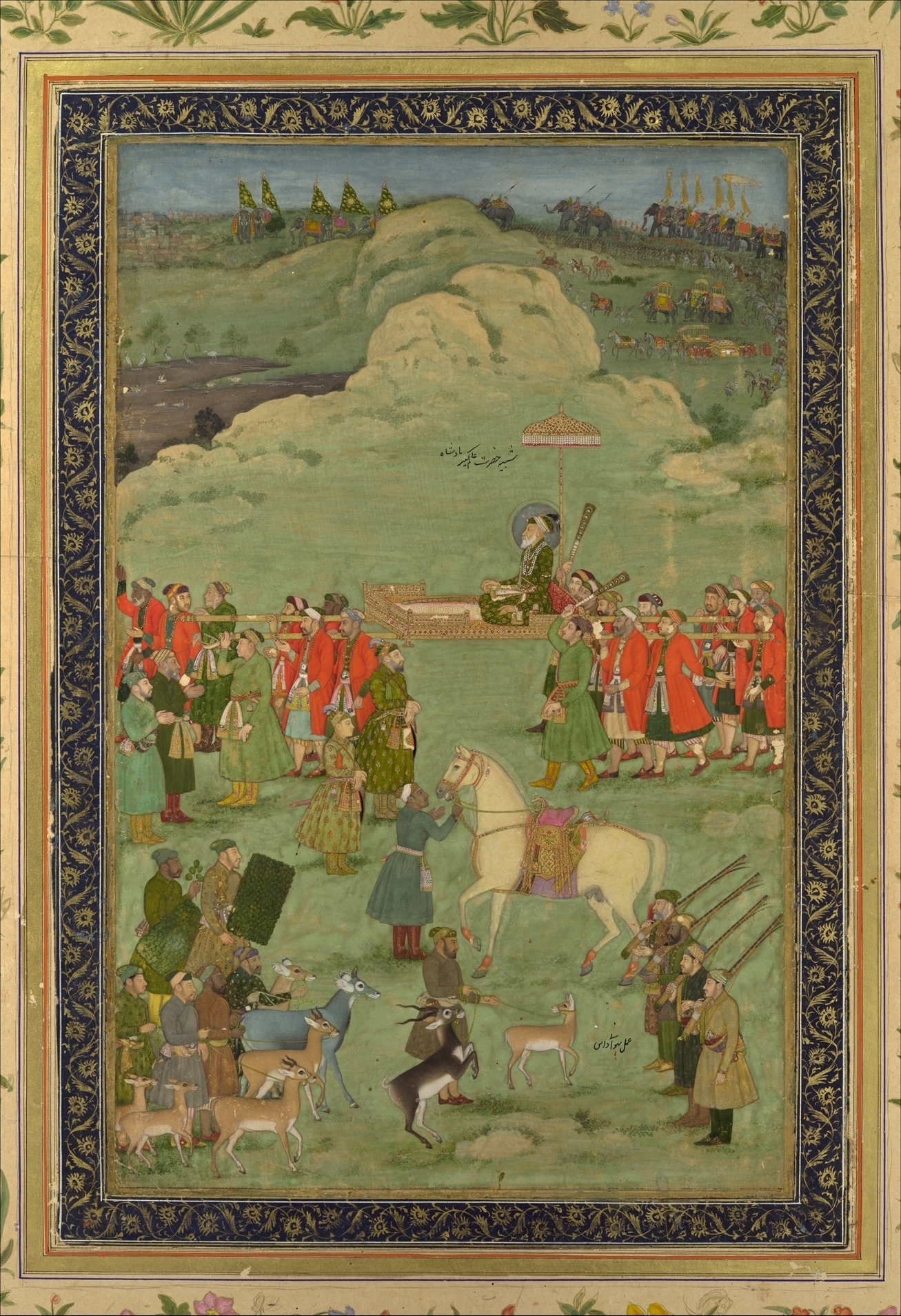
Aurangzeb leads his final expedition in 1705, leading an army of 500,000 troops.

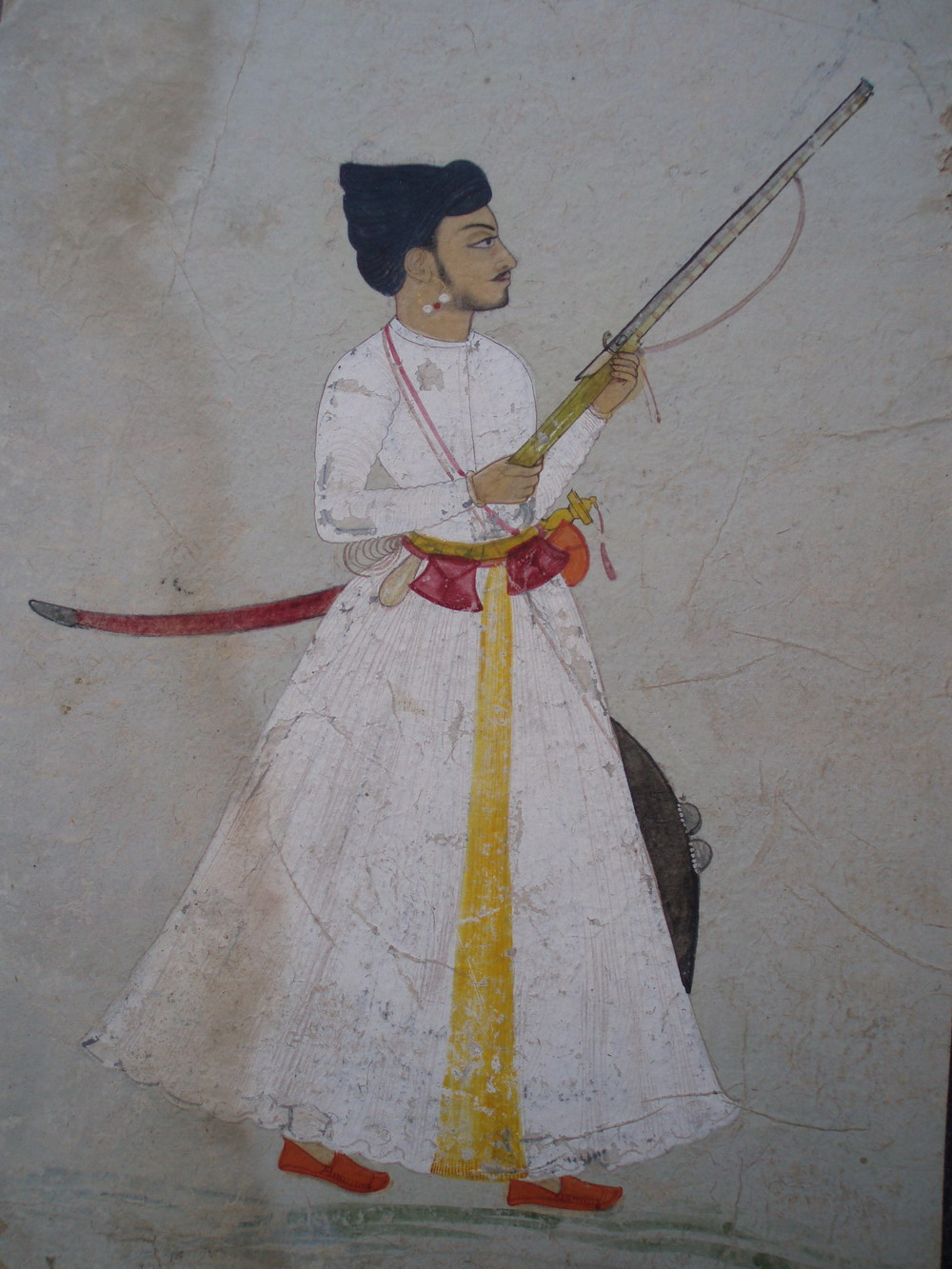
A Mughal-era aristocrat armed with a matchlock musket.

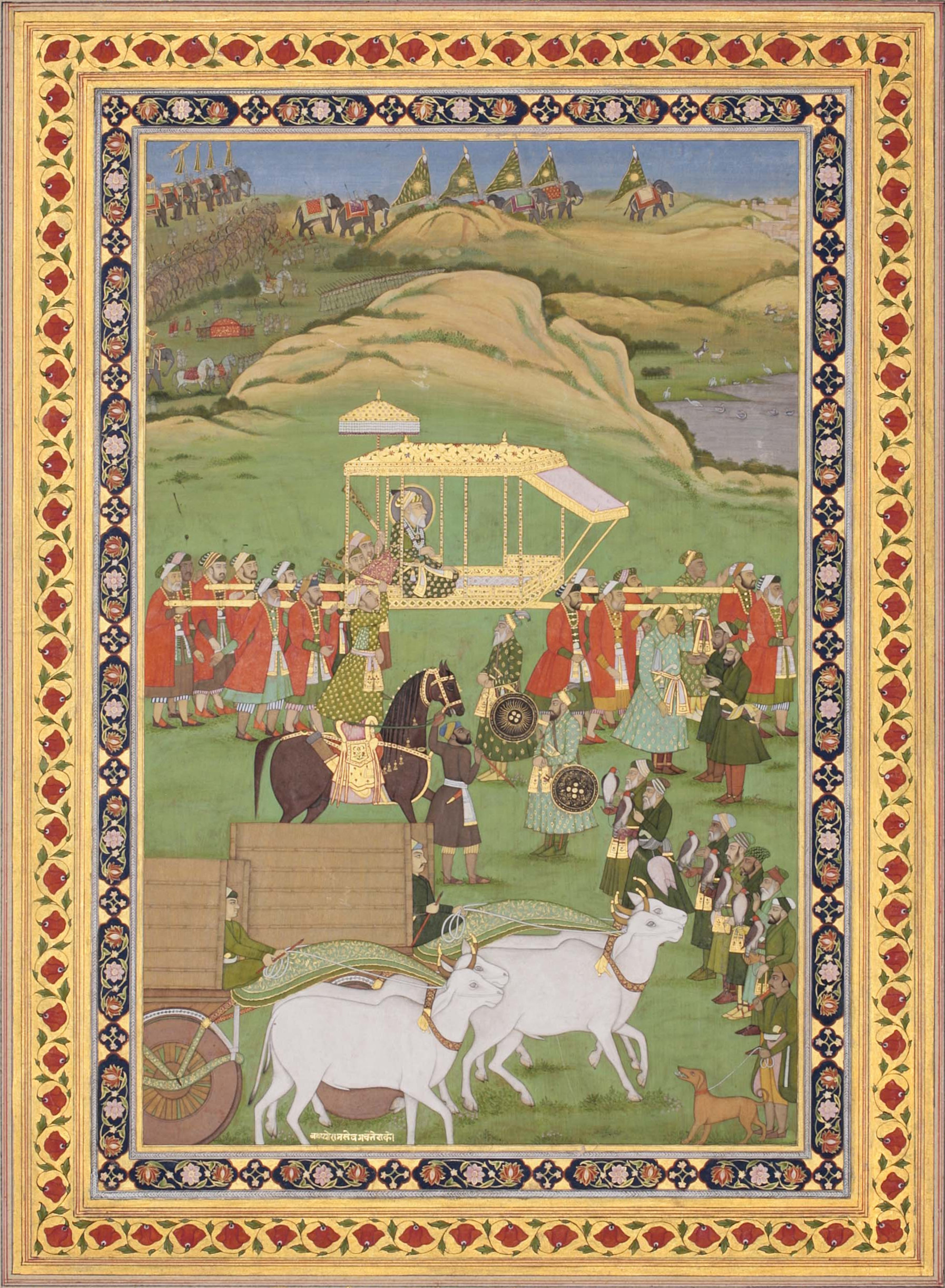
Aurangzeb, in later life, hunting with hounds and falconers

=== Ahom campaign ===
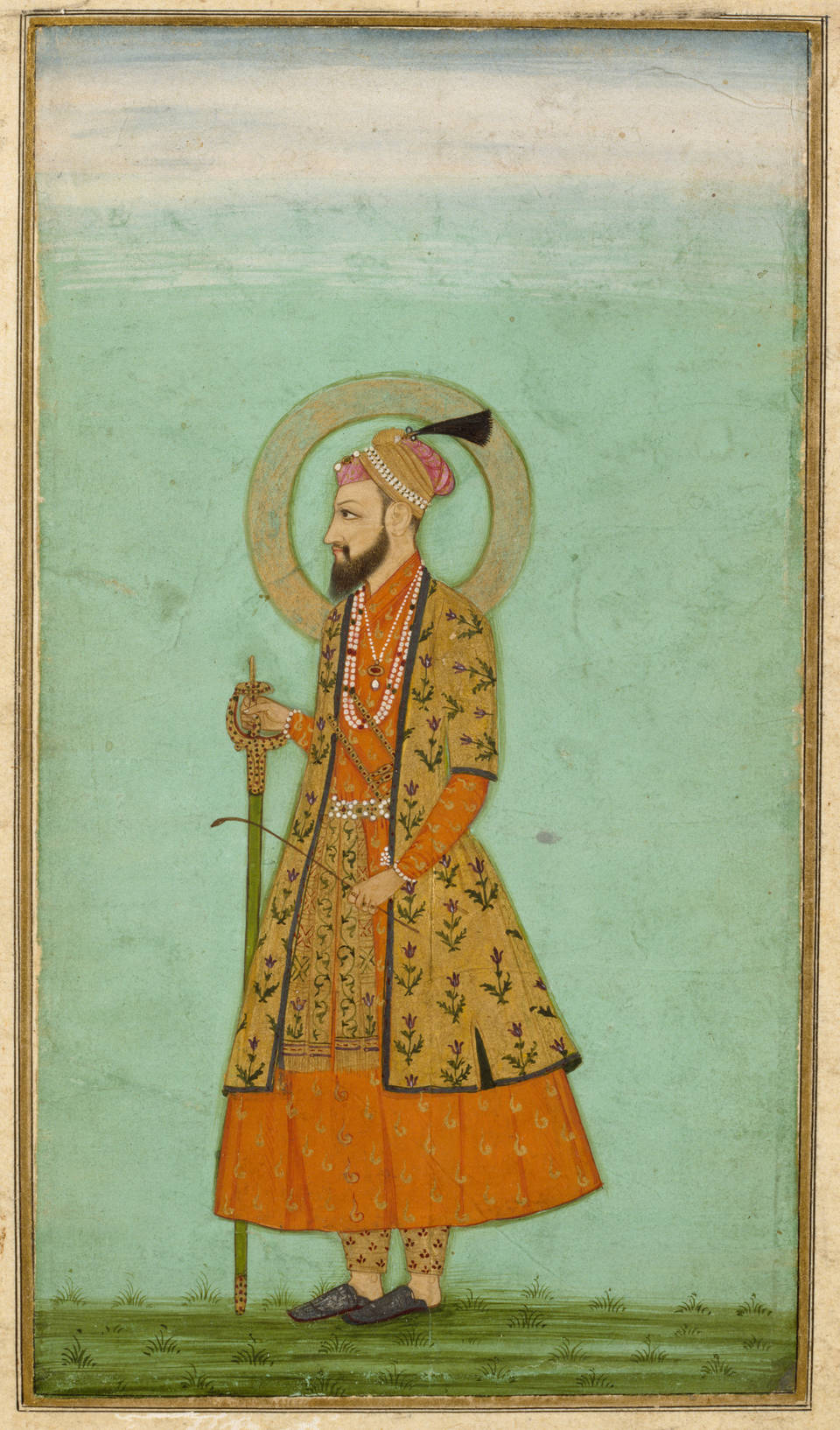
Portrait of Aurangzeb painted c. 1700

In 1660 Mir Jumla II, the viceroy of Bengal, was ordered to recover the lost territories.

The Mughals set out in November 1661. Within weeks they occupied and annexed the capital of Kuch Behar. Leaving a detachment to garrison it, the Mughal army began to retake their territories in Assam. Mir Jumla II advanced on Garhgaon, the capital of the Ahom kingdom, and reached it on 17 March 1662. The ruler, Raja Sutamla, had fled before his approach. The Mughals captured 82 elephants, 300,000 rupees in cash, 1000 ships, and 173 stores of rice.

On his way back to Dacca, in March 1663, Mir Jumla II died of natural causes.

The battle of Saraighat was the last battle in the last major attempt by the Mughals to extend their empire into Assam. Though the Mughals managed to regain Guwahati briefly after a later Borphukan deserted it, the Ahoms wrested control in the battle of Itakhuli in 1682 and maintained it till the end of their rule.

=== Satnami opposition ===
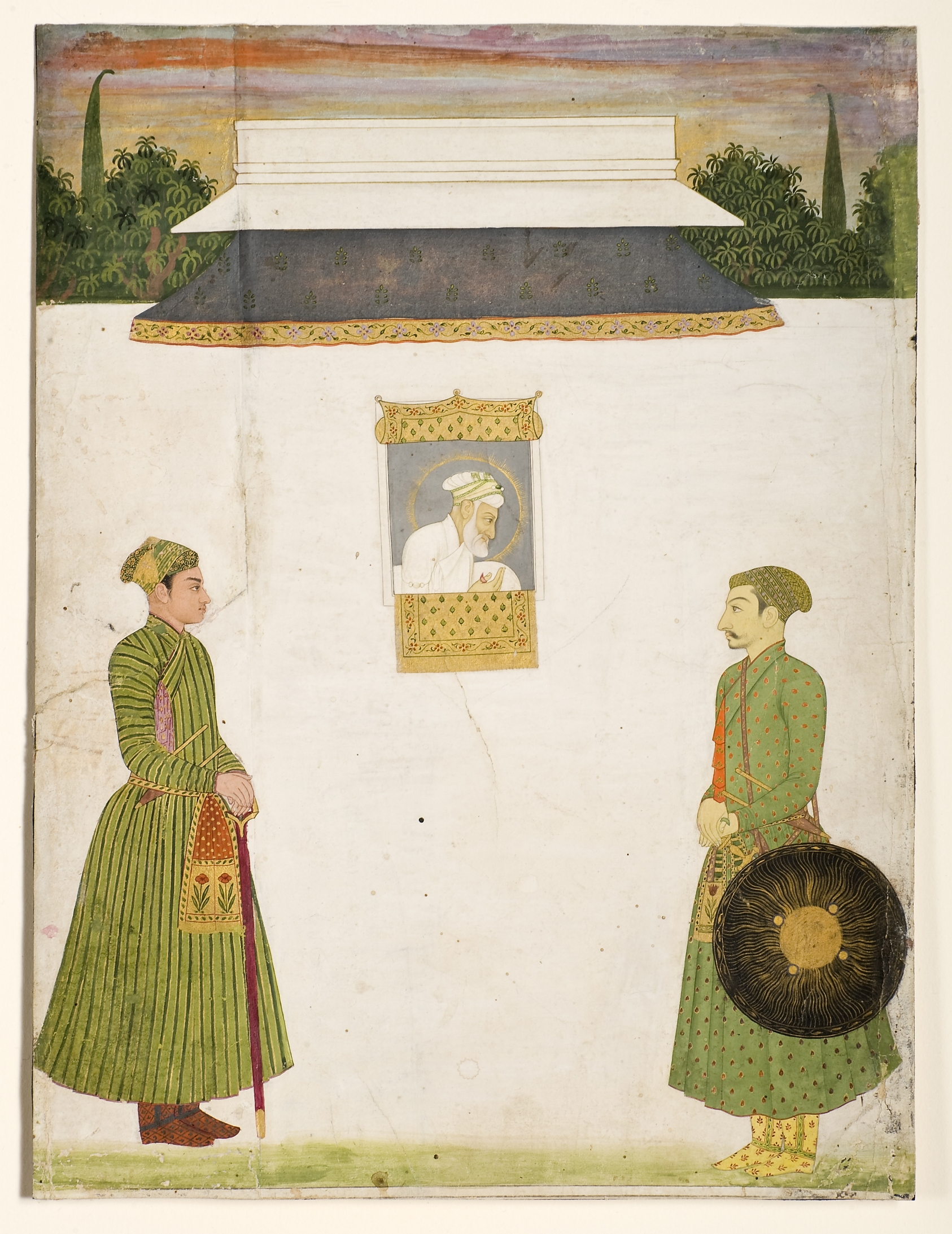
Aurangzeb dispatched his personal imperial guard during the campaign against the Satnami rebels.

In May 1672, the Satnami sect, obeying the commands of an old toothless woman (according to Mughal accounts), organised a revolt in the agricultural heartlands of the Mughal Empire. The Satnamis were known to have shaved off their heads and even eyebrows and had temples in many regions of northern India. They began a large-scale rebellion 75 miles southwest of Delhi.

The Satnamis believed they were invulnerable to Mughal bullets and believed they could multiply in any region they entered. The Satnamis initiated their march upon Delhi and overran small-scale Mughal infantry units.

Aurangzeb responded by organising a Mughal army of 10,000 troops, artillery, and a detachment of his imperial guards. Aurangzeb wrote Islamic prayers and drew designs that were sewn into the army's flags. His army crushed the Satnami rebellion.

=== Sikh opposition ===
According to Sikh accounts, the ninth Sikh Guru, Guru Tegh Bahadur, like his predecessors was opposed to forced conversion of the local population. Approached by Kashmiri Pandits to help them retain their faith and avoid forced religious conversions, Guru Tegh Bahadur sent a message to the emperor that if he could convince Teg Bagadur to convert to Islam, every Hindu would become a Muslim. In response, Aurangzeb ordered arrest of the Guru. He was then brought to Delhi and tortured in an attempt to convert him. On his refusal to convert, he was beheaded in 1675. In 1789, Gurudwara Sis Ganj Sahib was built in Delhi at the place where Guru Tegh Bahadur was beheaded.

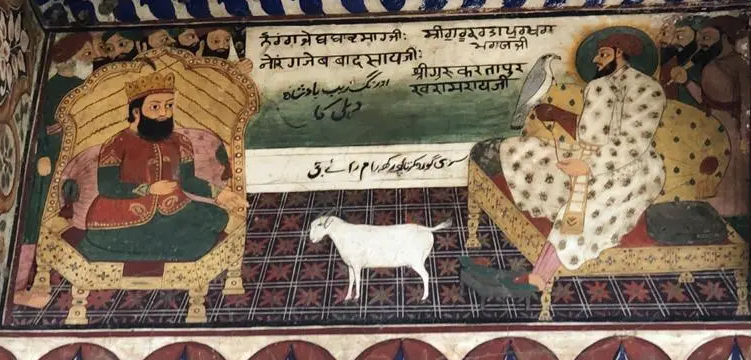
Ram Rai (right) meeting Mughal Emperor Aurangzeb (left) and displaying his supposed magical powers. A three-legged goat is depicted between them. Fresco art from Jhanda Sahib, Dehradun.

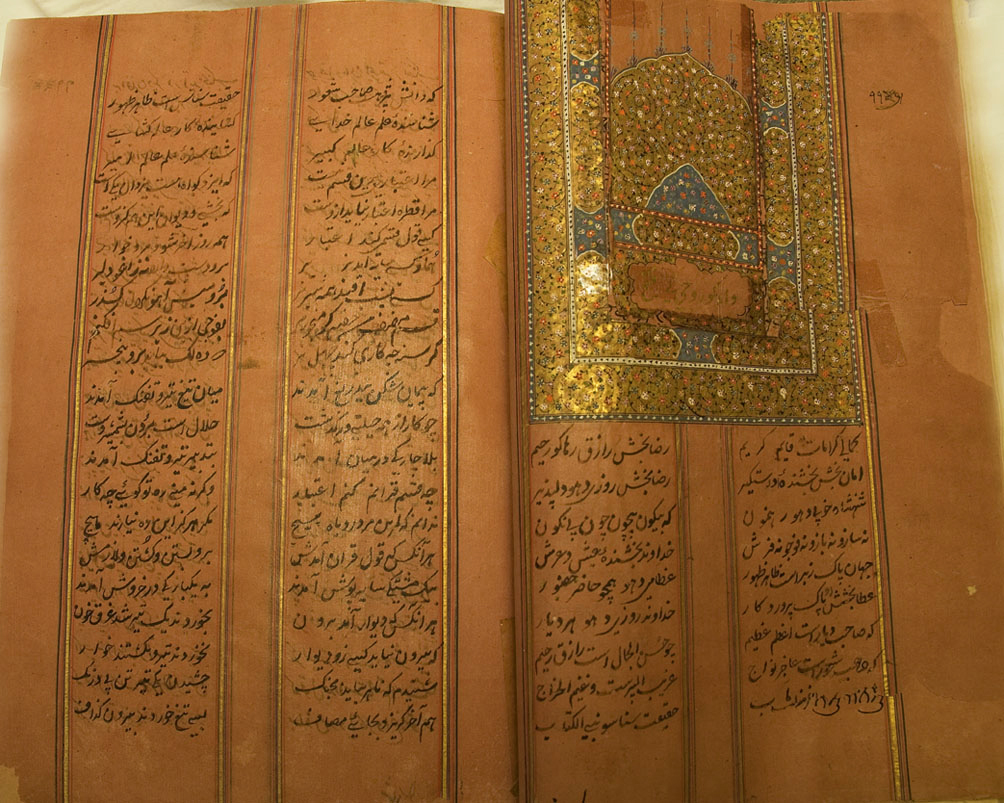
Zafarnama is the name given to the letter sent by the tenth Sikh Guru, Guru Gobind Singh in 1705 to Aurangzeb. The letter is written in Persian script.

In response, Guru Tegh Bahadur's son and successor, Guru Gobind Singh, further militarised his followers, starting with the establishment of Khalsa in 1699, eight years before Aurangzeb's death. In 1705, Guru Gobind Singh sent a letter entitled Zafarnamah, which accused Aurangzeb of cruelty and betraying Islam. Guru Gobind Singh's formation of Khalsa in 1699 led to the establishment of the Sikh Confederacy and later Sikh Empire.

=== Pashtun opposition ===
The Pashtun revolt in 1672 under the leadership of the warrior poet Khushal Khan Khattak of Kabul, was triggered when soldiers under the orders of the Mughal Governor Amir Khan allegedly molested a Parachi woman affiliated with the Safi tribe in modern-day Kunar Province of Afghanistan. The Safi tribe retaliated against the soldiers. This attack provoked a reprisal, which triggered a general revolt of most of tribes. Attempting to reassert his authority, Amir Khan led a large Mughal Army to the Khyber Pass, where the army was surrounded by tribesmen and routed, with only four men, including the governor, managing to escape.

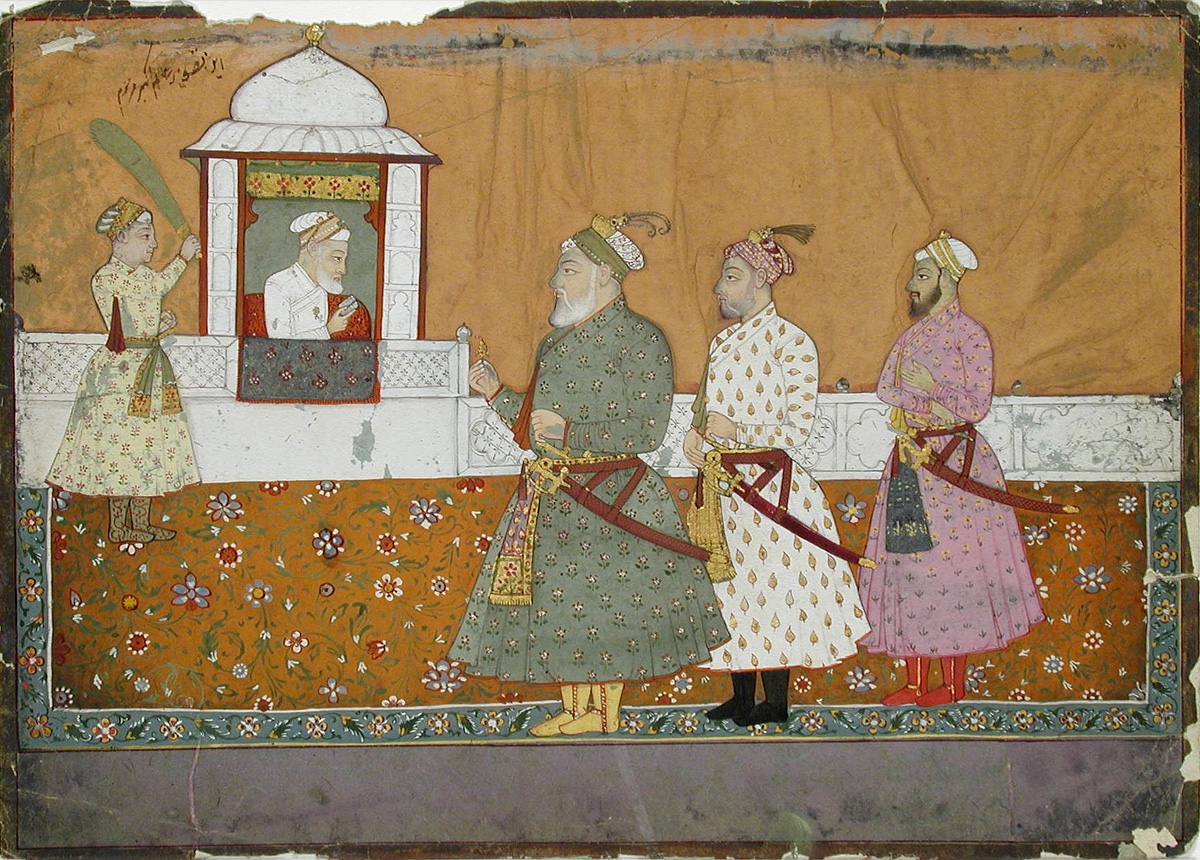
Aurangzeb in a pavilion with three courtiers below.

Aurangzeb's incursions into the Pashtun areas were described by Khushal Khan Khattak as "Black is the Mughal's heart towards all of us Pathans". Aurangzeb employed the scorched earth policy, sending armies who massacred, looted and burnt many villages. Aurangzeb also proceeded to use bribery to turn the Pashtun tribes against each other, with the aim that they would distract a unified Pashtun challenge to Mughal authority, and the impact of this was to leave a lasting legacy of mistrust among the tribes.

After that the revolt spread, the Mughals suffered a near total collapse of their authority in the Pashtun areas. The closure of the important Attock-Kabul trade route along the Grand Trunk road was particularly disastrous. By 1674, the situation had deteriorated to a point where Aurangzeb camped at Attock to personally take charge. Switching to diplomacy and bribery along with force of arms, the Mughals eventually split the rebels and partially suppressed the revolt, although they never managed to wield effective authority outside the main trade route.

=== Rathore rebellion ===
Described as the Rathore rebellion (1679–1707), the conflict between Rajputs of Marwar and the Mughals started after the death of Jaswant Singh, due to Aurangzeb's attempt to interfere in the succession of Marwar.

On 23 July 1679, Aurangzeb made attempts to divide Marwar into two Rathore principalities, one held by Inder Singh Rathore and other by Ajit Singh. Aurangzeb also proposed that Ajit Singh should be raised as a Muslim and offered Jodhpur in return. The resistance to Mughal interference was started by the Rajput nobles under Durgadas Rathore and erupted into an all-out war between the Mughal empire and Rajputs of Marwar supported by Mewar Rajputs. It lasted for almost thirty years. The rebellion reached a climax after the death of Aurangzeb on 3 March 1707 and the capture of Jodhpur by the Rathores on 12 March 1707.

== Death ==
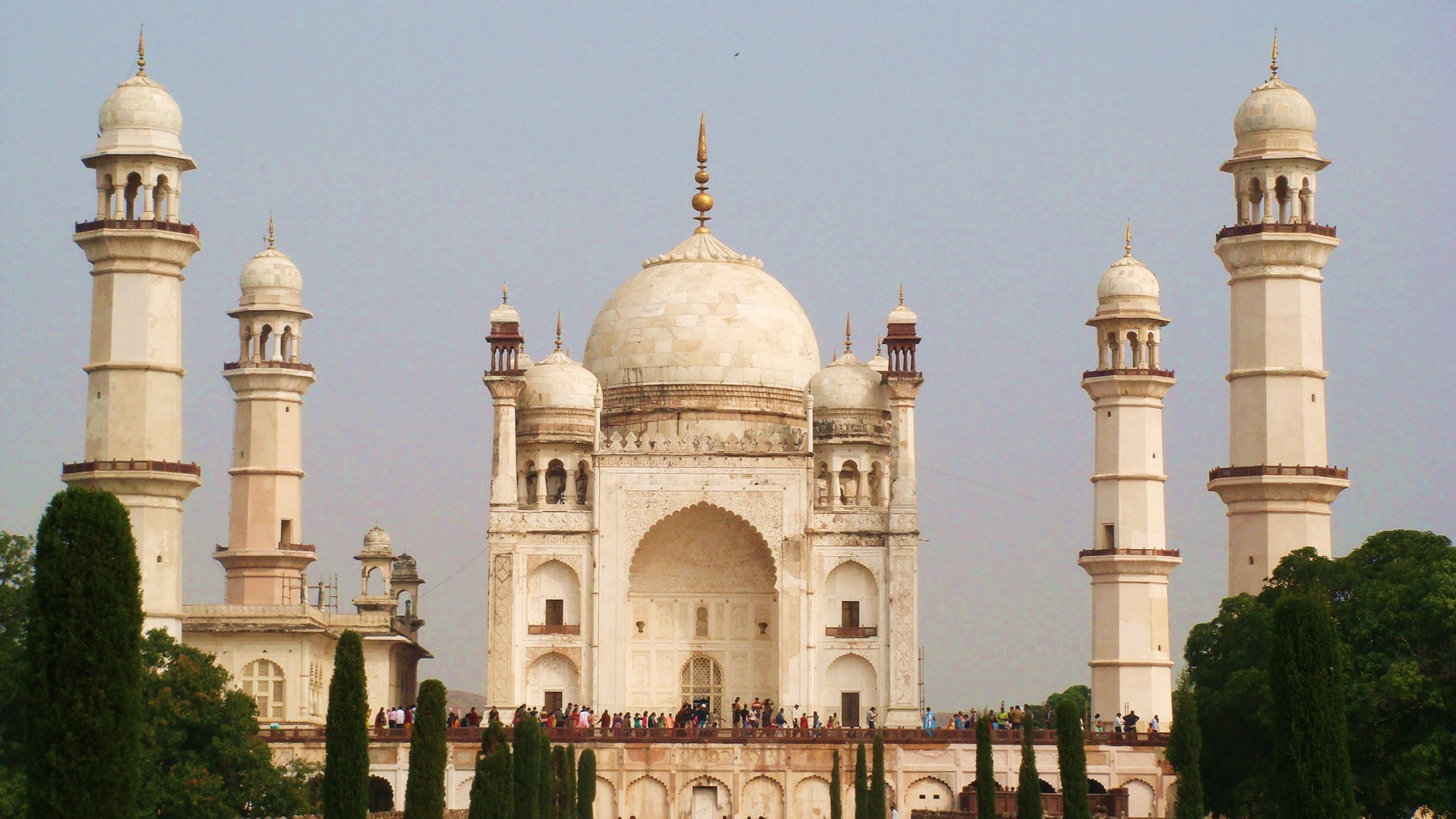
Bibi Ka Maqbara, the mausoleum of Aurangzeb's wife Dilras Banu Begum, was commissioned by him

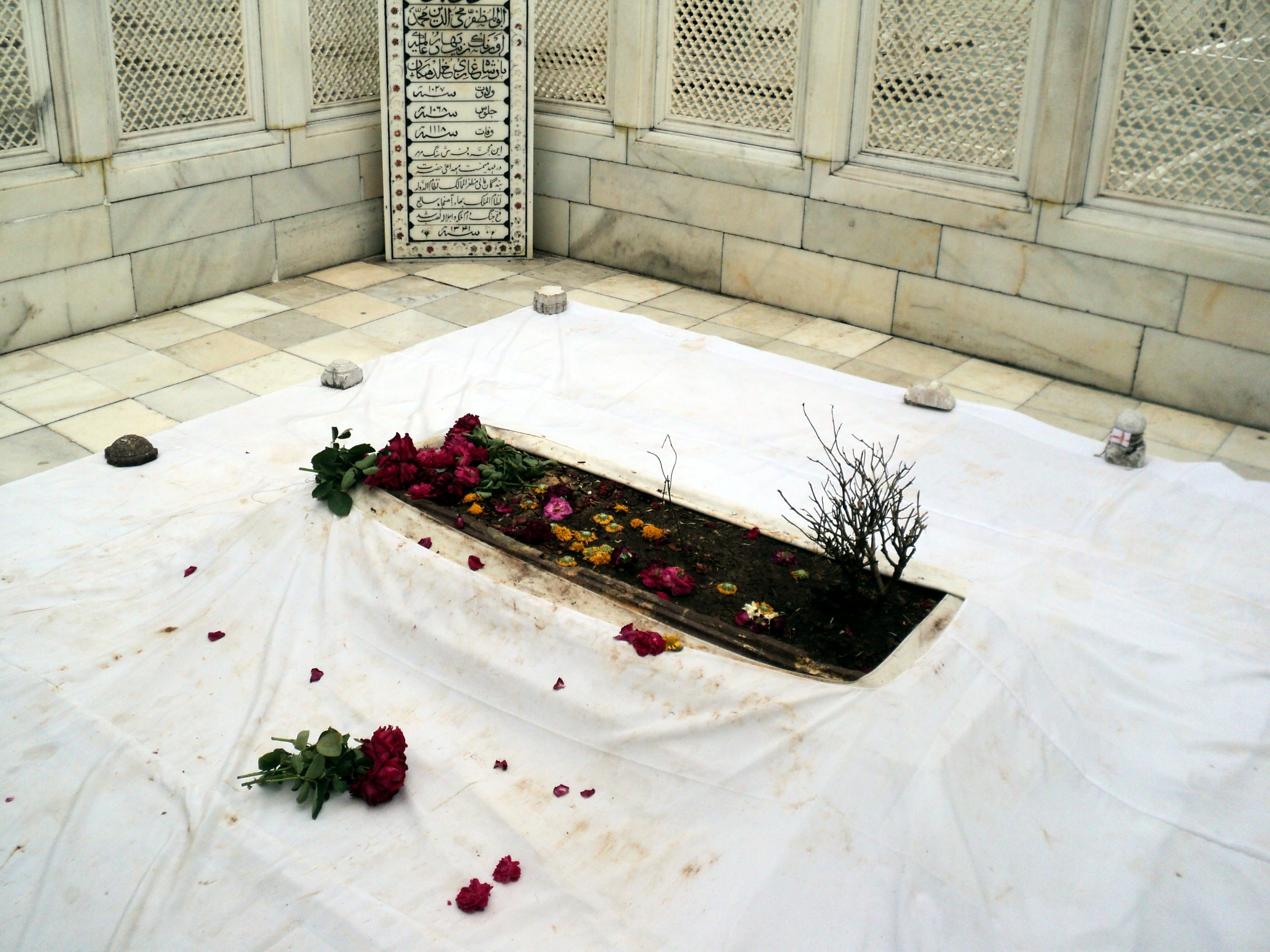
Aurangzeb's tomb in Khuldabad, Maharashtra.

By 1689, the conquest of Golconda and Mughal victories in the south expanded the Mughal Empire to 4 million square kilometres, with a population estimated to be over 158 million. However, this supremacy was short-lived. Historian Jos Gommans says that "... the highpoint of imperial centralisation under emperor Aurangzeb coincided with the start of the imperial downfall."

Aurangzeb constructed a small marble mosque known as the Moti Masjid (Pearl Mosque) in the Red Fort complex in Delhi. However, his constant warfare, especially with the Marathas, drove his empire to the brink of bankruptcy just as much as the wasteful personal spending and opulence of his predecessors.

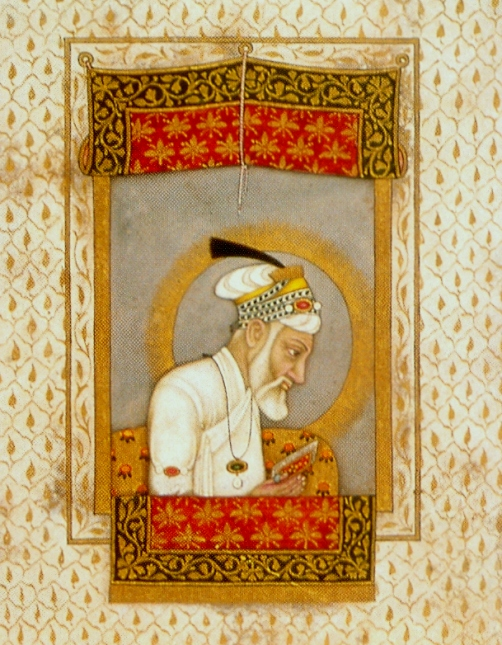
Aurangzeb reading the Quran

The Indologist Stanley Wolpert says that:

The conquest of the Deccan, to which Aurangzeb devoted the last twenty-six years of his life, was in many ways a Pyrrhic victory, costing an estimated hundred thousand lives a year during its last decade of fruitless, chess-game warfare ... The expense in gold and rupees can hardly be imagined or accurately estimated. Alamgir's moving capital alone-a city of tents thirty miles in circumference, two hundred and fifty bazaars, with half a million camp followers, fifty thousand camels, and thirty thousand elephants, all of whom had to be fed, stripped peninsular India of any and all of its surplus grain and wealth ... Not only famine, but bubonic plague arose ... Even Alamgir had ceased to understand the purpose for it all by ... 1705. The emperor was nearing ninety by then ... "I came alone and I go as a stranger. I do not know who I am, nor what I have been doing," the dying old man confessed to his son in February 1707.

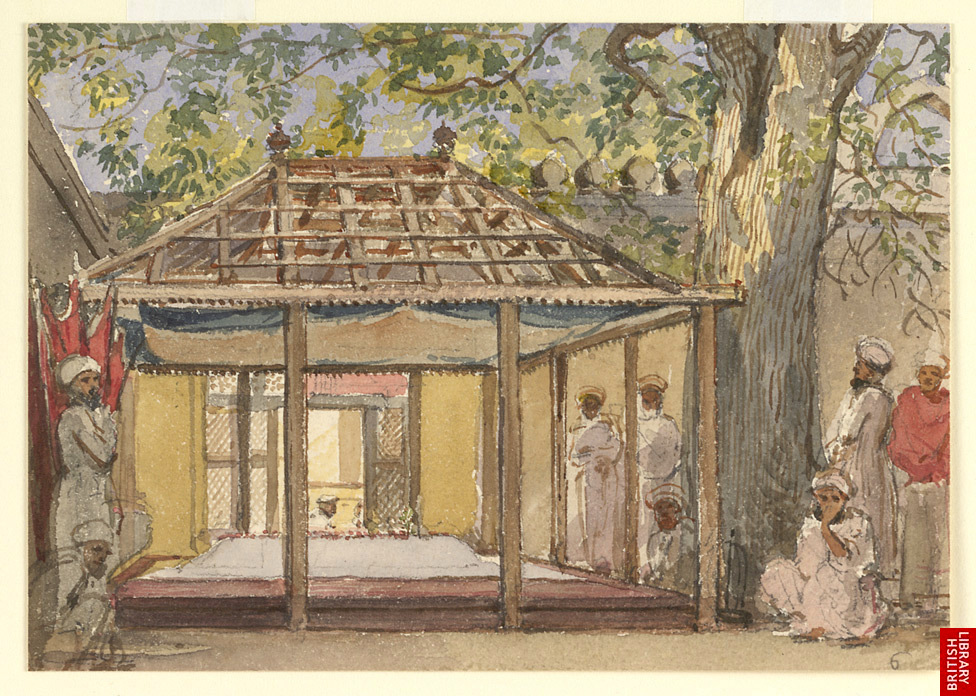
The unmarked grave of Aurangzeb in the mausoleum at Khuldabad, Maharashtra. Painting by William Carpenter, 1850s

Even when ill and dying, Aurangzeb made sure that the populace knew he was still alive, for if they had thought otherwise then the turmoil of another war of succession was likely. He died at his military camp in Bhingar near Ahmednagar on 3 March 1707 at the age of 88 at approximately 8:00 a.m., shortly after performing his morning prayer. He outlived many of his children and had only 300 rupees with him which were later given to charity as per his instructions. Prior to his death, he requested not to spend extravagantly on his funeral but to keep it simple. His modest open-air grave in Khuldabad, Aurangabad, Maharashtra expresses his deep devotion to his Islamic beliefs. It is sited in the courtyard of the shrine of the Sufi saint Shaikh Burhan-u'd-din Gharib, who was a disciple of Nizamuddin Auliya of Delhi.

Brown writes that after his death, "a string of weak emperors, wars of succession, and coups by noblemen heralded the irrevocable weakening of Mughal power". She notes that the populist but "fairly old-fashioned" explanation for the decline is that there was a reaction to Aurangzeb's oppression. Although Aurangzeb died without appointing a successor, he instructed his three sons to divide the empire among themselves. His sons failed to reach a satisfactory agreement and fought against each other in a war of succession. Aurangzeb's immediate successor was his third son Azam Shah, who was defeated and killed in June 1707 at the battle of Jajau by the army of Bahadur Shah I, the second son of Aurangzeb.

I came a stranger into this world, and a stranger I depart. I know nothing of myself, what I am, and for what I am destined. The instant which passed in power, has left only sorrow behind it. I have not been the guardian and protector of the empire.

— Aurangzeb, in his last letter to his son, Azam Shah

Both because of Aurangzeb's over-extension and because of Bahadur Shah's weak military and leadership qualities, entered a period of terminal decline. Immediately after Bahadur Shah occupied the throne, the Maratha Empire — which Aurangzeb had held at bay, inflicting high human and monetary costs even on his own empire — consolidated and launched effective invasions of Mughal territory, seizing power from the weak emperor. Within decades of Aurangzeb's death, the Mughal Emperor had little power beyond the walls of Delhi.

== Assessments and legacy ==
Aurangzeb [was] uncomparably his father’s superior: a wiser man, a juster king, a more intelligent and benevolent ruler.

— Stanley Lane-Poole

A miniature painting of Timur (centre), his descendants and the Mughal emperors. Centre to left: Miran Shah, Abu Sa'id, Babur, Akbar, Shah Jahan Centre to right: Muhammad Mirza, Umar Shaikh, Humayun, Jahangir, Aurangzeb

Aurangzeb's rule has been the subject of both praise and controversy. During his lifetime, victories in the south expanded the Mughal Empire to 4 million square kilometres, and he ruled over a population estimated to be over 158 million subjects. His critics argue that his ruthlessness and religious bigotry made him unsuitable to rule the mixed population of his empire. Some critics assert that the persecution of Shias, Sufis and non-Muslims to impose practices of orthodox Islamic state, such as imposition of sharia and jizya religious tax on non-Muslims, doubling of custom duties on Hindus while abolishing it for Muslims, executions of Muslims and non-Muslims alike, and destruction of temples eventually led to numerous rebellions. G. N. Moin Shakir and Sarma Festschrift argue that he often used political opposition as pretext for religious persecution, and that, as a result, groups of Jats, Marathas, Sikhs, Satnamis and Pashtuns rose against him.

Multiple interpretations of Aurangzeb's life and reign over the years by critics have led to a very complicated legacy. Some argue that his policies abandoned his predecessors' legacy of pluralism and religious tolerance, citing his introduction of the jizya tax and other policies based on Islamic ethics; his demolition of Hindu temples; the executions of his elder brother Dara Shikoh, King Sambhaji of Maratha and Sikh Guru Tegh Bahadur (Note: See also "Aurangzeb, as he was according to Mughal Records"; more links at the bottom of that page. For Muslim historian's record on major Hindu temple destruction campaigns, from 1193 to 1729 AD, see Richard Eaton (2000), "Temple Desecration and Indo-Muslim States", Journal of Islamic Studies, Vol. 11, Issue 3, pp. 283–319) and the prohibition and supervision of behaviour and activities that are forbidden in Islam such as gambling, fornication, and consumption of alcohol and narcotics. At the same time, some historians question the historical authenticity of the claims of his critics, arguing that his destruction of temples has been exaggerated, he paid for temple maintenance, and in the latter half of his reign employed significantly more Hindus, especially Marathas, in his imperial bureaucracy than his predecessors and opposed bigotry against Hindus and Shia Muslims in imperial service.

Muhammad Al-Munajjid has argued that the opinions from Islamic scholarly community towards Aurangzeb were positive because of the emperor's general attitude and actions, such as abolishing Bid'ah celebrations, musics, and the customs of bowing and kissing the ground which were done by his predecessors, practically adhering to the practice of Salafi while still held to Hanafite creed. (Note: through IslamQA.info, Professor Muhammad al-Munajjid on his online correspondence has answered that he based his opinion Silk ad-Durar fi A'yaan al-Qarn ath-Thaani 'Ashar (4/113) and Aurangzeb biography by Professor 'Abd al-Mun'im an-Nimr in his book Tareekh al-Islam fi'l-Hind.) Apparently this view of Aurangzeb were influenced by Muhammad Saleh Kamboh, who acted as his teacher.

In Pakistan, author Haroon Khalid writes that, "Aurangzeb is presented as a hero who fought and expanded the frontiers of the Islamic empire" and "is imagined to be a true believer who removed corrupt practices from religion and the court, and once again purified the empire." The academic Munis Faruqui also opines that the "Pakistani state and its allies in the religious and political establishments include him in the pantheon of premodern Muslim heroes, especially lauding him for his militarism, personal piety, and seeming willingness to accommodate Islamic morality within state goals."

Muhammad Iqbal, considered the spiritual founder of Pakistan, admired Aurangzeb. Iqbal Singh Sevea, in his book on the political philosophy of the thinker, says that "Iqbal considered that the life and activities of Aurangzeb constituted the starting point of Muslim nationality in India". Maulana Shabbir Ahmad Usmani, in his funeral oration, hailed M.A. Jinnah, the founder of Pakistan, to be the greatest Muslim since Aurangzeb. Pakistani-American academic Akbar Ahmed described President Zia-ul-Haq, known for his Islamisation drive, as "conceptually ... a spiritual descendent of Aurangzeb" because Zia had an orthodox, legalistic view of Islam.

Muhammad Sayyid Tantawy, a grand mufti of Egypt, once called Aurangzeb as "A remnant of the Rightly-Guided Rashidun Caliphs", as appreciation of Aurangzeb commitment to Islam teaching.

Beyond the individual appreciations, Aurangzeb is seminal to Pakistan's national self-consciousness, as historian Ayesha Jalal, while referring to the Pakistani textbooks controversy, mentions M. D. Zafar's A Text Book of Pakistan Studies where we can read that, under Aurangzeb, "Pakistan spirit gathered in strength", while his death "weakened the Pakistan spirit." Another historian from Pakistan, Mubarak Ali, also looking at the textbooks, and while noting that Akbar "is conveniently ignored and not mentioned in any school textbook from class one to matriculation", contrasts him with Aurangzeb, who "appears in different textbooks of Social Studies and Urdu language as an orthodox and pious Muslim copying the Holy Quran and sewing caps for his livelihood." This image of Aurangzeb is not limited to Pakistan's official historiography.

As of 2015, about 177 towns and villages of India have been named after Aurangzeb. Historian Audrey Truschke points out that Bharatiya Janta Party (BJP), Hindutva proponents and some others outside Hindutva ideology regard Aurangzeb as Muslim zealot in India. Jawaharlal Nehru wrote that, due to his reversal of the cultural and religious syncretism of the previous Mughal emperors, Aurangzeb acted "more as a Moslem than an Indian ruler". Mahatma Gandhi was of the view that there was greater degree of freedom under Mughal rule than the British rule and asks that "in Aurangzeb's time a Shivaji could flourish. Has one hundred and fifty years of the British rule produced any Pratap and Shivaji?"

=== Literatures ===
Aurangzeb has prominently featured in the following books

- 1675 – Aureng-zebe, play by John Dryden, written and performed on the London stage during the Emperor's lifetime.
- 1688 – Alamgirnama by Mirza Mohammed Qasim official biographer at Aurangzeb's court
- 1909 – Aurangzeb Alamgir par ek nazar
- 19?? – Hindi fiction novel by Acharya Chatursen Shastri
- 1970 – Shahenshah (Marathi: शहेनशहा), the Marathi fictional biography by N S Inamdar; translated into English in 2017 by Vikrant Pande as Shahenshah – The Life of Aurangzeb
- 2017 – 1636: Mission to the Mughals, by Eric Flint and Griffin Barber
- 2018 – Aurangzeb: The Man and the Myth, by Audrey Truschke
- 2026 — Aurangzeb 'Alamgir and the Mughal Empire: A History Retold, Munis D. Faruqui

== Issue ==
Shah Jahan fastens a veil of pearls, rubies and emeralds to the head of his son Prince Aurangzeb before he wedded Dilras Banu (19 May 1637). The setting is a riverfront terrace of the Agra Fort overlooking the River Jumna.

Name	Birth	Death	Notes
By Dilras Banu Begum (c. 1622 – 8 October 1657)
Zeb-un-Nissa	15 February 1638	26 May 1702	Poet; imprisoned by her father. Never married or had children.
Zinat-un-Nissa Begum	5 October 1643	7 May 1721	Became the Padshah Begum.
Zubdat-un-Nissa Begum	2 September 1651	17 February 1707	Married once and had a son.
Muhammad Azam Shah	28 June 1653	20 June 1707	Overthrown by his elder half-brother.
Muhammad Akbar	11 September 1657	31 March 1706	Exiled to Safavid empire.
By Nawab Bai (unknown – 1691)
Muhammad Sultan	30 December 1639	14 December 1676	Imprisoned by his father.
Bahadur Shah I	14 October 1643	27 February 1712	Mughal Emperor; conspired to overthrow his younger brother.
Badr-un-Nissa Begum	17 November 1647	9 April 1670	Never married or had any children.
By Aurangabadi Mahal (unknown – November 1688)
Mihr-un-Nissa Begum	28 September 1661	2 April 1706	Married once and had 2 sons.
By Udaipuri Mahal (unknown – July 1707)
Muhammad Kam Bakhsh	7 March 1667	14 January 1709	Ruler of Bijapur.

== See also ==
- Flags of the Mughal Empire
- Mughal architecture
- Mughal weapons
- List of largest empires

== Bibliography ==
- Avari, Burjor (2013), Islamic Civilization in South Asia: A History of Muslim Power and Presence in the Indian Subcontinent, Routledge, ISBN 978-0-41558-061-8
- Durant, Will (1993) [1935]. The Story of Civilization: Our Oriental Heritage. Simon & Schuster. ISBN 978-1-56731-023-8.
- Farooqi, Naimur Rahman (1989). Mughal-Ottoman relations: a study of political & diplomatic relations. Idarah-i Adabiyat-i Delli. OCLC 20894584.
- Malik, Adnan; Zubair, Muhammad; Parveen, Uzman (2016). "Effects of social reforms of shaykh Ahmad sirhindi (1564–1624) on Muslim society in the sub continent". Journal of Social Sciences and Humanities. 55 (2). University of Karachi: 155–164. doi:10.46568/jssh.v55i2.70.
- Matthee, Rudi (2012). Persia in Crisis: Safavid Decline and the Fall of Isfahan. I.B.Tauris. ISBN 978-1-84511-745-0.
- Mukerjee, Soma (2001). Royal Mughal ladies and their contributions. Gyan Publishing House. ISBN 978-81-212-0760-7.
- Richards, John F. (1996) [1993]. The Mughal Empire. The New Cambridge History of India. Vol. 5. Cambridge University Press. ISBN 978-0-521-56603-2.
- Sarkar, Jadunath (1925) [1912]. History of Aurangzib Vol. I-II (PDF) (2nd ed.). Calcutta: M.C. Sarkar & Sons. Archived (PDF) from the original on 20 January 2017. Alt URL
- Truschke, Audrey (2017). Aurangzeb: The Life and Legacy of India's Most Controversial King. Stanford University Press. ISBN 978-1-5036-0203-8. (First published by Penguin Random House India under the title Aurangzeb: The Man and the Myth.)

Aurangzeb Timurid dynasty Born: c. 1618 Died: 3 March 1707
Regnal titles
Preceded by Shah Jahan	Mughal Emperor; 1658–1707	Succeeded by Azam Shah
