= Takht ya takhta =

Persian proverb governing Mughal succession

Takht ya takhta (تخت یا تخته; تخت یا تختہ; lit. 'throne or plank') is a Persian proverb, current in Urdu and associated South Asian languages, that frames a high-stakes contest as a binary between royal victory and death. The phrase pairs takht ("throne") with takhta ("plank", understood as the wooden board of a coffin or bier), so that the saying reads literally as "either the throne or the funeral plank". The emphatic form ya takht, ya takhta ("either throne, or plank") is listed in the Rekhta Urdu dictionary as an idiom in its own right, glossed as "either a throne or a bier, said on engaging in a risky enterprise".

The proverb has come to denote the open-ended, winner-take-all inheritance politics of the Mughal Empire (1526–1857). The Mughals, descendants of Timurid and Chinggisid rulers of Central Asia, did not practise primogeniture; imperial succession was instead contested by armed princes. Every major transition between 1530 and 1707 was settled, in whole or in part, by a war among the dead emperor's sons, and the most widely cited instance is the war of 1657–1659 among the sons of Shah Jahan, which Aurangzeb won by defeating Dara Shikoh at the Battle of Samugarh, executing him the following year, and imprisoning his own father for the last eight years of Shah Jahan's life.

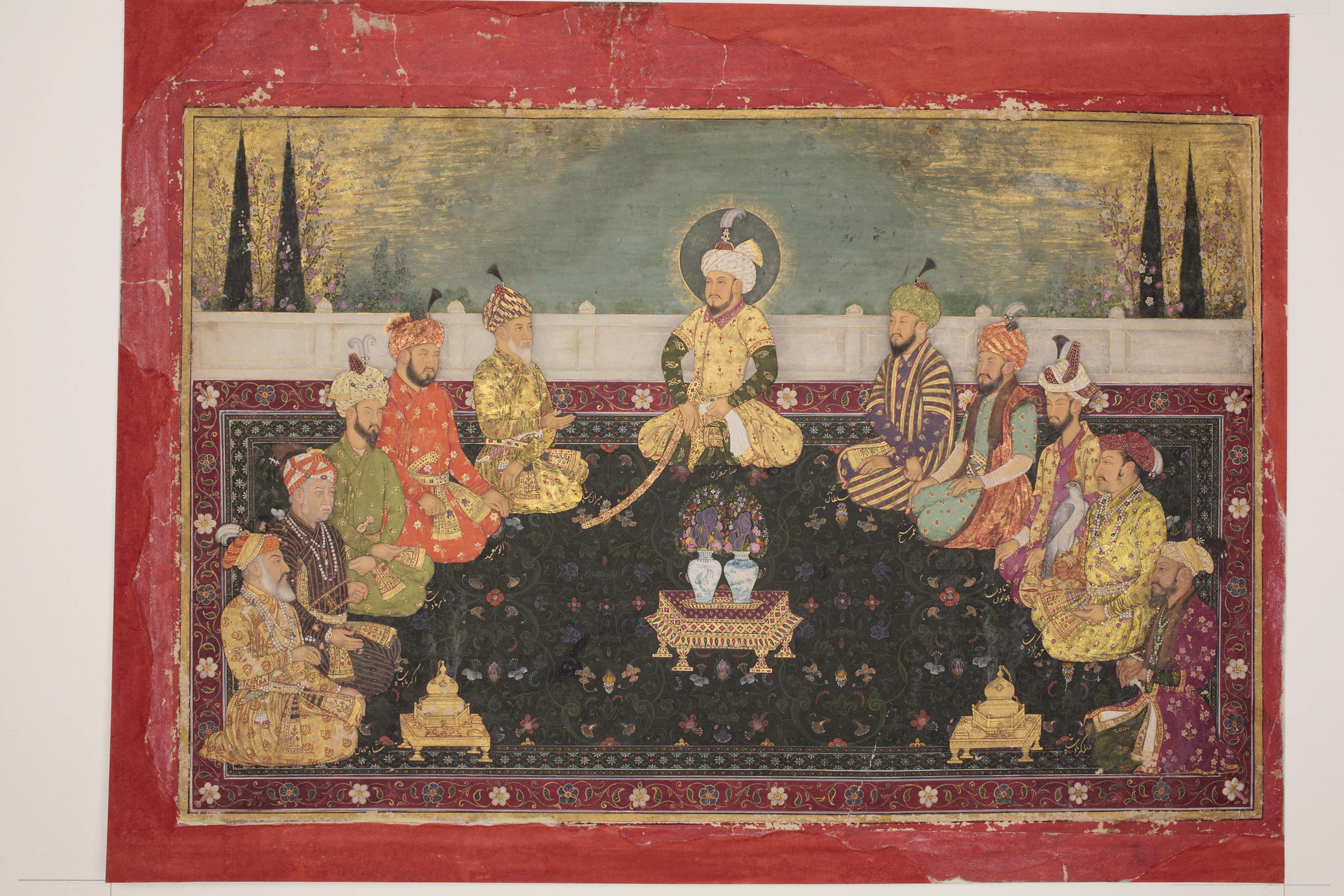
Group portrait of Mughal rulers from Babur to Aurangzeb, with Timur seated at centre, visualising the dynastic line within which succession struggles unfolded.

Modern historians divide over how to read the system. Scholars associated with the Aligarh tradition, notably Irfan Habib and Satish Chandra, treat the recurrent succession wars as a structural weakness that drained imperial resources. A revisionist reading, associated most closely with Munis D. Faruqui, argues that open succession was a deliberate mechanism through which the dynasty tested princes, recruited new allies, and renewed the imperial coalition. Stephen Dale has set the Mughal pattern in a wider comparative frame, describing it as a variant of a shared Turko-Mongol inheritance that the Ottoman and Safavid empires solved differently.

In contemporary South Asia, particularly Pakistan, the phrase circulates as a political metaphor for leadership contests that end in imprisonment or execution. The legal scholar L. Ali Khan, writing in CounterPunch in October 2020, used takht ya takhta as the organising frame for an essay arguing that Pakistan's recurrent imprisonments and exiles of deposed prime ministers reproduce the Mughal succession pattern.

== Etymology and forms ==
Takht (تخت) denotes a royal seat, throne, or raised dais, and is attested in Persian-language administrative and literary texts from the late Sasanian Empire and early Islamic periods onward. Takhta (تختہ) means a board, plank, or flat wooden surface, and by metonymy the wooden bier on which a corpse is laid. The proverb exploits the near-homophony of the two words, producing a compact antithesis between sovereignty and mortality.

The phrase circulates in several forms. Takht ya takhta places the two nouns in simple disjunction; the emphatic ya takht, ya takhta ("either throne, or plank") is listed as a separate headword in the Rekhta Urdu dictionary, glossed as "either a throne or a bier, said on engaging in a risky enterprise" and expanded as "either we will succeed or we will lose our lives". A fuller idiomatic form, takht ya takhta-i tabut ("throne, or the plank of the coffin"), appears in Urdu proverb collections as "either we will sit upon the throne of kingdom, or lie upon the bier of death". Some English-language writers translate takhta as "gallows" or "funeral pyre" rather than "plank"; the legal scholar L. Ali Khan, for example, glosses the phrase as "get the throne or be killed".

Although the saying is often described as specifically Mughal, its origins are broader. It belongs to a wider Persianate oral and literary culture that circulated through the Iranian plateau, Central Asia, and Anatolia, and its diffusion into South Asia is consistent with the broader spread of Persianate court vocabulary during the Delhi Sultanate and early Mughal periods.

== Background: Turko-Mongol and Timurid inheritance ==
The proverb summarises a political norm older than the Mughals. Among the Turkic and Mongol polities of the post-Chinggisid world, the royal office was conceived not as a transmissible personal property subject to fixed rules of descent but as a collective right of the ruling lineage, from which a successor emerged through competition. Scholars sometimes describe this arrangement as a form of tanistry: candidates drawn from the ruling house contested succession and the strongest prevailed.

The Mongol tradition codified elements of this norm in the Yassa, the body of laws and customs associated with Genghis Khan, and in the practice of the kurultai, the assembly of princes and nobles that confirmed a new ruler. A candidate's right to the throne rested on descent from the founder but descent alone was insufficient; contenders had to demonstrate capacity in war, attract followers, and secure the consent of senior commanders.

The Turko-Mongol successor states of Central Asia inherited this framework. Under the Timurids, the descendants of Timur (died 1405), the empire fragmented at each generational transition into rival princely appanages, with each adult male of the lineage entitled to a share and a plausible claim on the whole. Timur's son Shah Rukh and grandson Ulugh Beg ruled in succession but only after intra-dynastic contest, and by the late fifteenth century the Timurid domains had splintered into a patchwork of competing princely states centred on Samarkand, Herat, and Kabul.

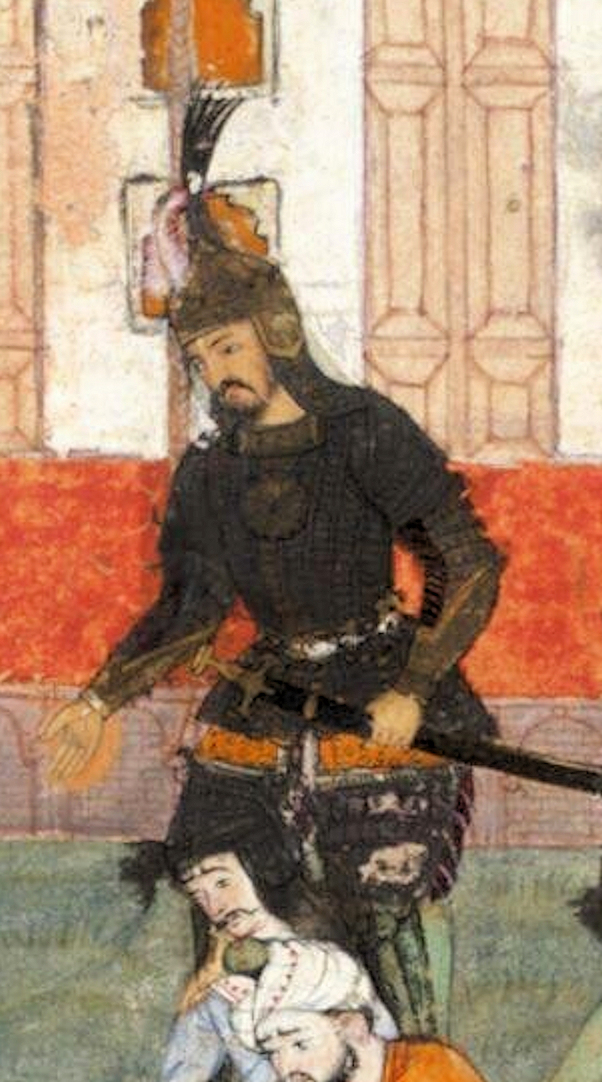
Babur in armour, a Timurid prince whose career emerged from the competitive inheritance world the proverb later came to summarise.

It was from this splintered Timurid world that Babur (reigned 1526–1530), the founder of the Mughal dynasty in India, emerged. The dynasty in India proudly traced its lineage from both Genghis and Timur, the former as the ancestor of Babur's mother and the latter as the paternal progenitor; Harbans Mukhia notes that the dual descent was a feature the Mughals repeatedly foregrounded in their self-presentation. Babur's memoirs, the Baburnama, describe a childhood spent manoeuvring among kin for the small Central Asian principality of Fergana and, later, for Samarkand; his political horizon was shaped by the assumption that royal authority passed through contest rather than designation. In his later career as a warrior-king in India, Babur explicitly added the title of ghazi to his seal after defeating the Rajput confederation at the Battle of Khanua in 1527 and placed himself in a line with earlier Muslim conquerors of India. Ali Anooshahr reads this self-presentation as an expression of an older Perso-Turkic ideology of royal ordeal, in which the sovereign's claim is validated by survival of military test; on the eve of Khanua, Babur is reported to have exhorted his troops that "it is better to die with a good name than to live with a bad one".

== Mughal succession politics ==
=== Rejection of primogeniture ===
No Mughal emperor designated an heir in the manner of European primogeniture, and no Mughal chancery document codified a fixed rule of succession. The Sharia inheritance rules governing private property did not extend to the sovereign office, and classical Sunni juridical discussions of the caliphate offered no prescriptive mechanism for transfer within a ruling lineage. In practice, every Mughal succession between Babur's death in 1530 and the deposition of Bahadur Shah Zafar in 1858 was decided by some combination of declared parental preference, prior princely position, the balance of noble support, and, most commonly, armed contest.

Emperors often expressed personal preferences. Babur's will designated Humayun as his successor; Jahangir favoured his third son Khurram (the future Shah Jahan) over the elder Khusrau Mirza; Shah Jahan publicly favoured Dara Shikoh over his three brothers. These preferences carried political weight but not binding force. A paternal designation could be resisted by disfavoured sons with armies and allies, and repeatedly was.

=== Princely households ===
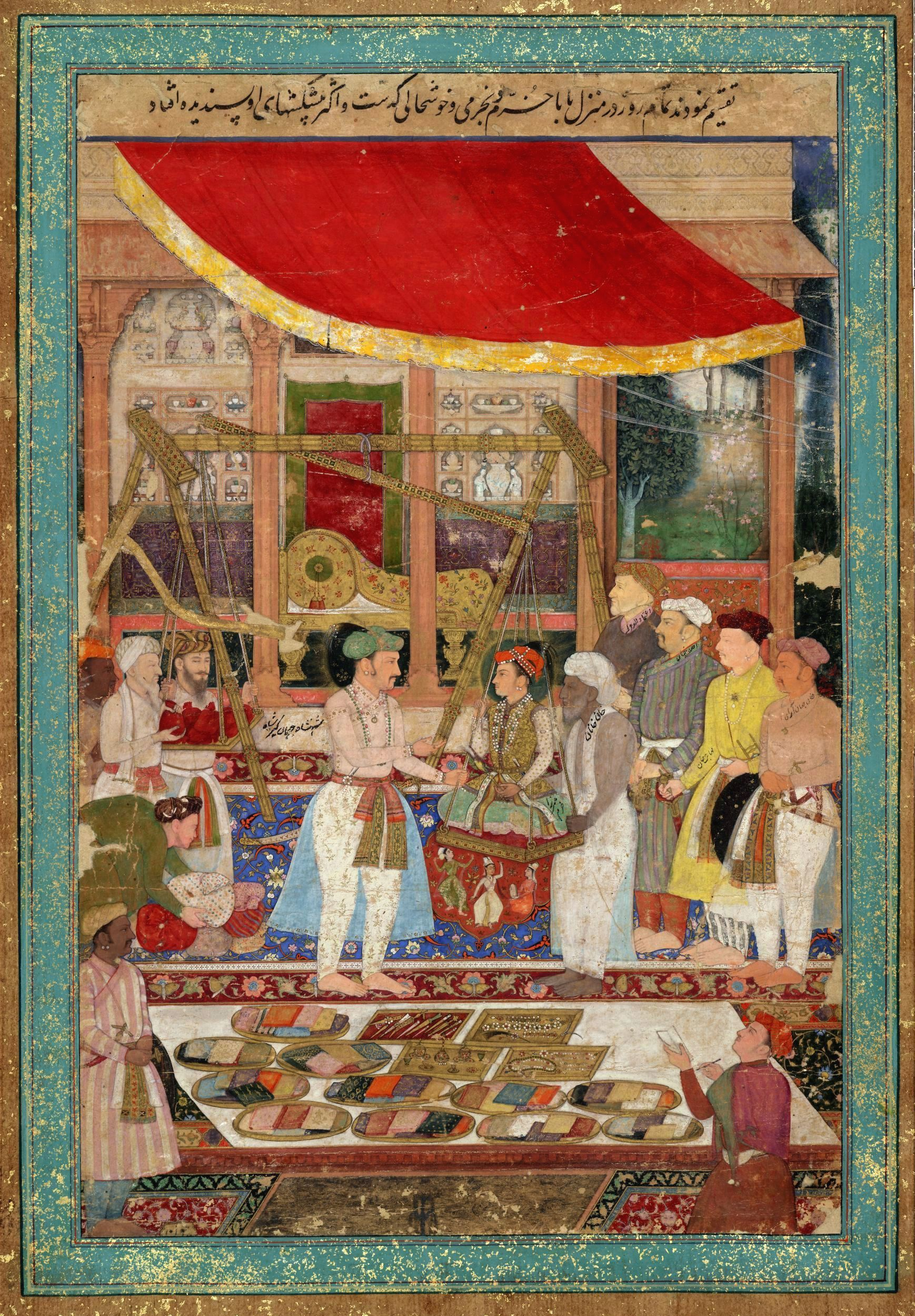
Jahangir weighing Prince Khurram, later Shah Jahan, illustrating the ceremonial and political prominence of Mughal princes before succession crises.

From the reign of Akbar (1556–1605) onwards, Mughal princes were endowed with an institutional apparatus that both prepared them for succession and made succession unavoidably competitive. Each adult prince was given a mansab (military-administrative rank), a jagir (revenue assignment) sufficient to maintain a household and contingent of troops, and, from around the 1580s, a provincial governorship (suba). Munis Faruqui has argued that these princely households grew to contain several thousand persons each by the seventeenth century and were in effect miniature imperial administrations, with personal servants, clerks, finance officers, religious advisers, and military retainers drawn from across the empire.

Princely households were therefore not passive assets awaiting the moment of succession. They were active political instruments throughout an emperor's reign. Princes employed poets, religious authorities, and secretaries; they corresponded with Rajput rajas, Deccani sultans, and Safavid envoys; they maintained intelligence networks against each other. The khanazad (household) was the operational substrate that made takht ya takhta workable as more than a metaphor.

== Major Mughal wars of succession ==
=== Humayun and his brothers, 1530–1555 ===
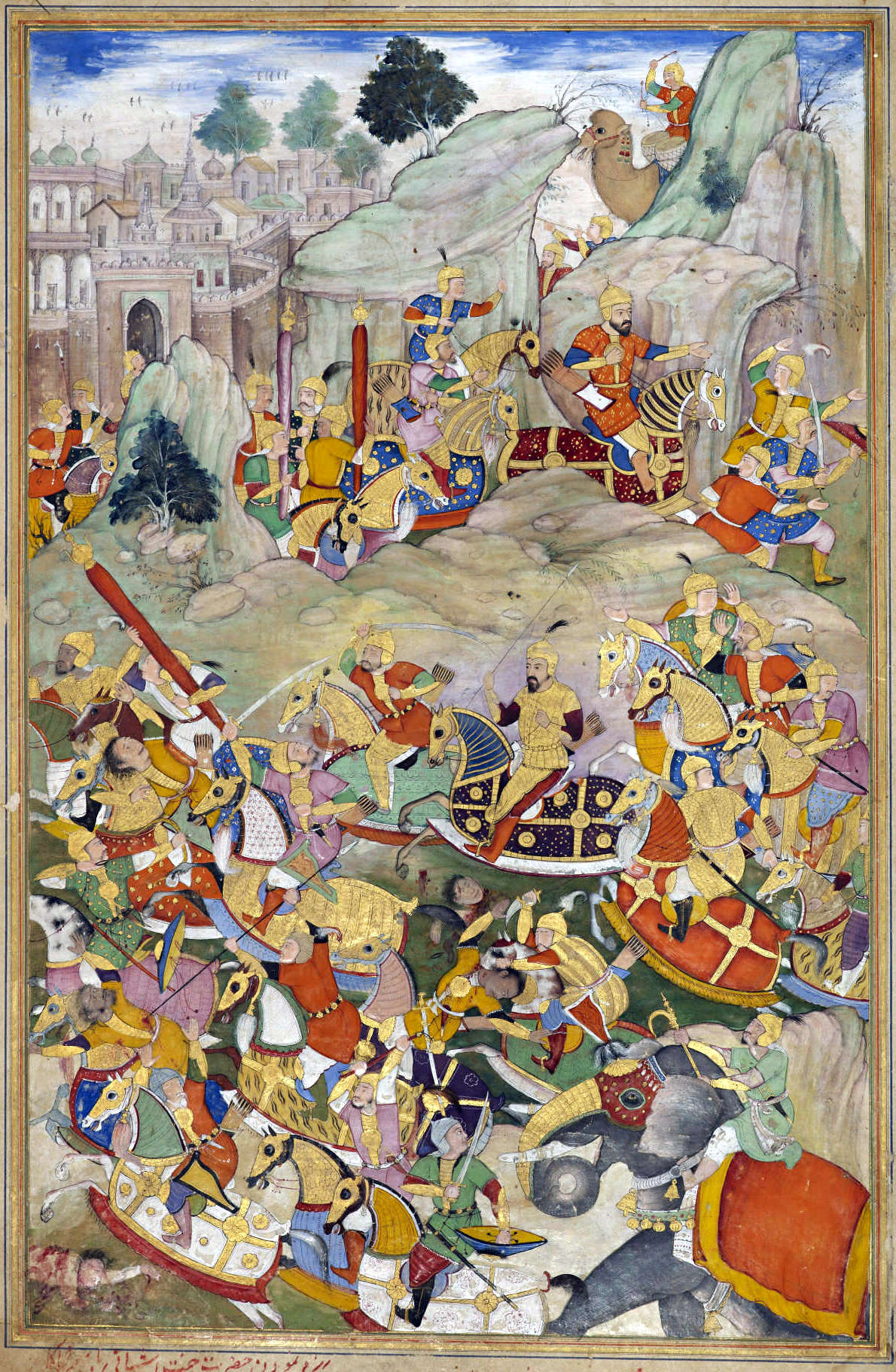
Humayun's defeat of Kamran Mirza in 1553, one of the earliest major fraternal contests in Mughal succession politics.

Babur died in December 1530, designating his eldest son Humayun as successor but granting extensive appanages to his younger sons Kamran, Askari, and Hindal. Humayun ascended the throne at Agra without immediate armed contest, but the appanage settlement ensured that the dynasty's Indian and Afghan territories remained contested between brothers for the next fifteen years. Kamran's Kabul appanage gave him control of the frontier, the route to Central Asia, and a semi-independent military household; his open disobedience and repeated seizures of Mughal territory in the Punjab gave the dynasty its first extended intra-fraternal contest.

Humayun's defeats at Chausa (1539) and Kannauj (1540) at the hands of the Afghan Sher Shah Suri drove him into exile in Safavid Persia; for a decade the Mughal throne in India was effectively vacant. When Humayun returned in 1555 with Safavid support, he settled the fraternal contest by blinding Kamran at the demand of his Afghan and Persian commanders and confining his other surviving brothers to distant governorships.

=== Akbar and Mirza Hakim ===
Humayun died at Delhi in January 1556 after a fall in his library. His thirteen-year-old son Akbar succeeded him under the regency of Bairam Khan. The transition was contested chiefly from outside the family, by Hemu, a general of the Suri successor dynasty, who was defeated at the Second Battle of Panipat. Intra-dynastic contest was muted because Akbar's most serious rival was an uncle, Mirza Muhammad Hakim, who governed Kabul for most of Akbar's reign and periodically mobilised against his nephew before his death in 1585. Munis Faruqui's study of Mirza Hakim has argued that the Kabul-based half-brother was more than a nuisance: he functioned as an alternative pole of Mughal legitimacy and was courted by disaffected nobles throughout Akbar's long reign. The relative quiescence of the 1556 succession is often taken to mark the point at which Mughal princely politics began to be disciplined by the emergent mansabdari system.

=== The accession of Shah Jahan, 1628 ===
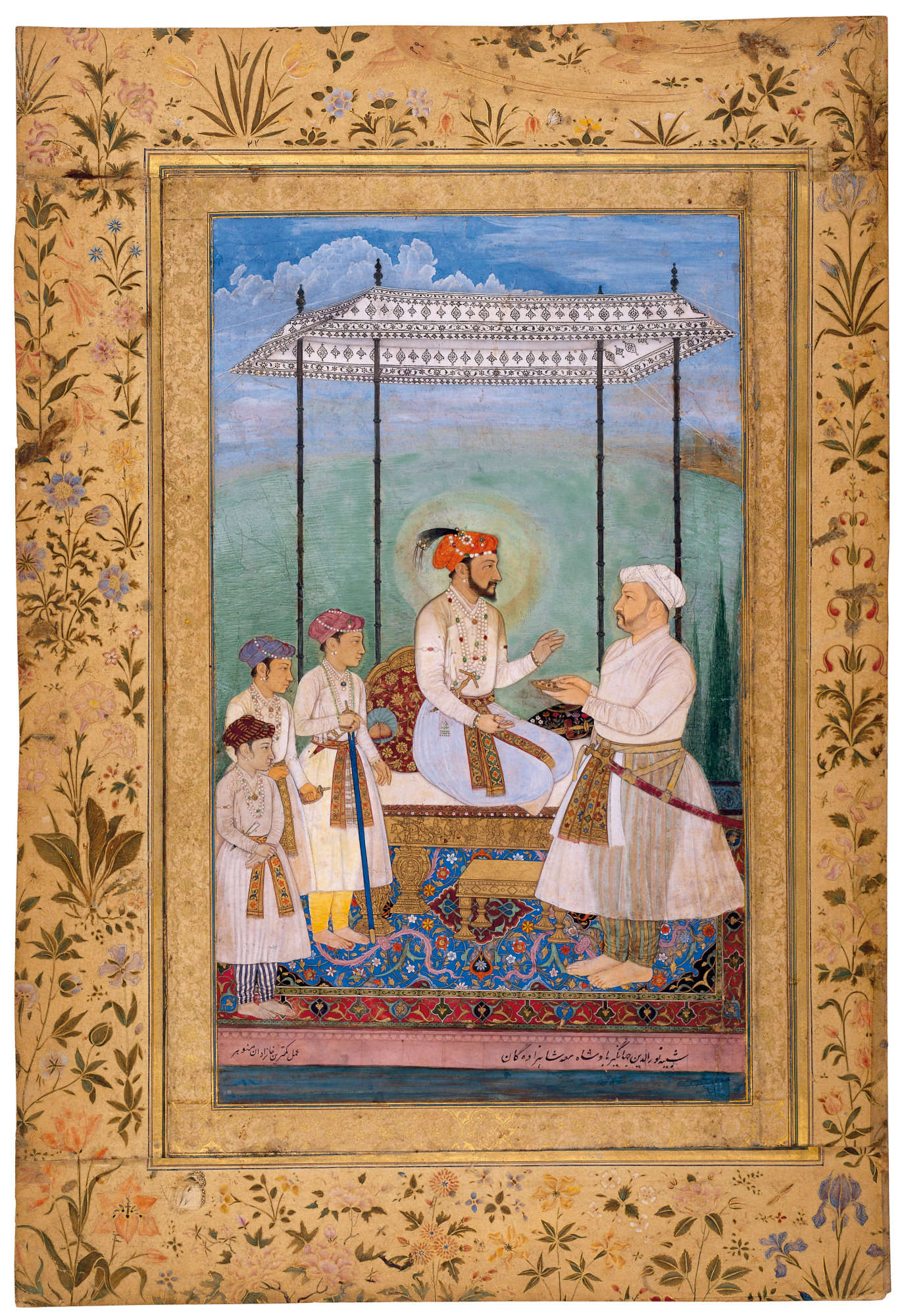
Shah Jahan with his sons Dara Shikoh, Shah Shuja and Aurangzeb in 1628, the princely generation that would later contest the throne.

Jahangir's death near Bhimber in October 1627 opened a contested succession among his surviving sons. The eldest, Khusrau Mirza, had been blinded and killed during Jahangir's reign after an earlier rebellion; the most powerful, Khurram (Shah Jahan), had rebelled against Jahangir between 1622 and 1625, been reconciled, and was governing the Deccan at the moment of his father's death. A fourth son, Shahryar Mirza, supported by the politically formidable Empress Nur Jahan, briefly attempted to claim the throne from Lahore; he was defeated in a short campaign by Khurram's father-in-law Asaf Khan, who arranged for the deaths of Shahryar and two of Khurram's surviving nephews so that Khurram could enter Agra as the sole adult male of the dynasty.

=== The war of 1657–1659 ===
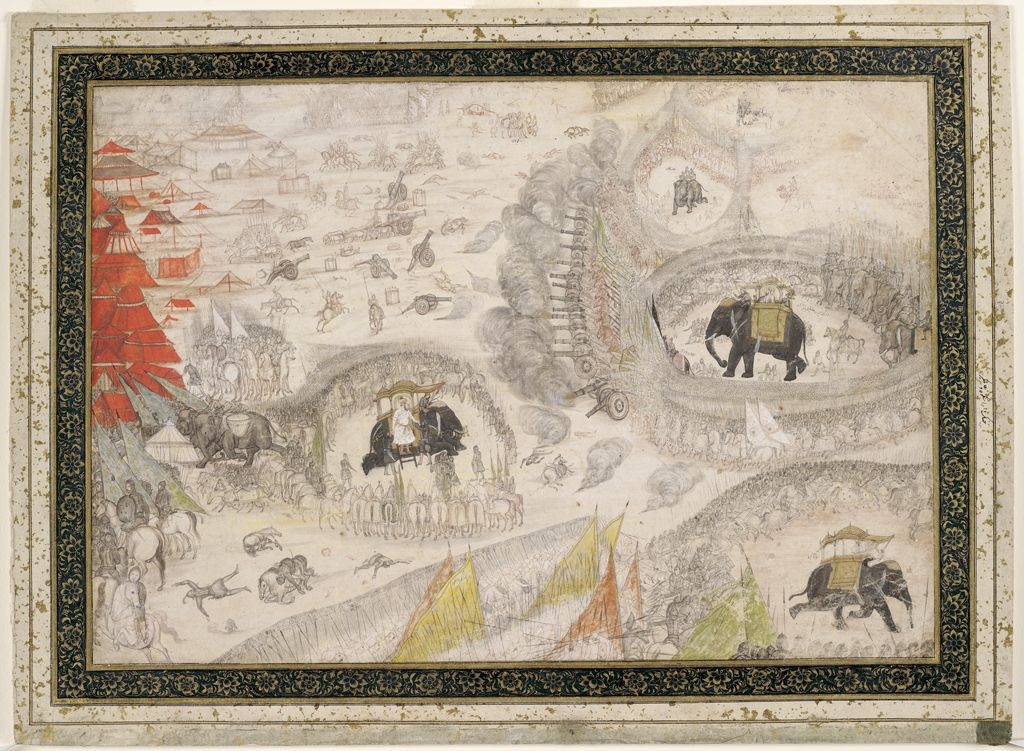
The Battle of Samugarh in May 1658, the decisive engagement that cleared Aurangzeb's path to the throne.

The best-known application of the proverb is the war that followed Shah Jahan's serious illness in September 1657. Shah Jahan had four adult sons: Dara Shikoh, heir-designate, who held no provincial governorship but remained at court; Shah Shuja, governor of Bengal; Aurangzeb, governor of the Deccan; and Murad Bakhsh, governor of Gujarat. Shah Jahan's illness triggered each son to declare himself emperor, to strike coins, and to mobilise his household troops.

In early 1658 Aurangzeb allied with Murad, defeated imperial forces under Dara's general Jaswant Singh at the Battle of Dharmat in April 1658, and defeated Dara himself at the Battle of Samugarh in May 1658. Shah Jahan, who had recovered, was besieged in the Agra Fort and imprisoned there by Aurangzeb; he remained in confinement until his death in 1666. Aurangzeb then captured and executed Dara in 1659; defeated Shuja, who disappeared into Arakan and died in uncertain circumstances; and imprisoned Murad, who was executed in 1661 for an earlier killing of a Gujarati minister.

The French physician François Bernier, who was in Mughal service during the war, wrote his Travels in the Mogul Empire as an eyewitness account; his narrative describes the contest as a "war" that "continued about five years" among the sons of Shah Jahan and has remained a foundational source for European and later Indian historiography of the event.

=== The post-1707 cascade ===
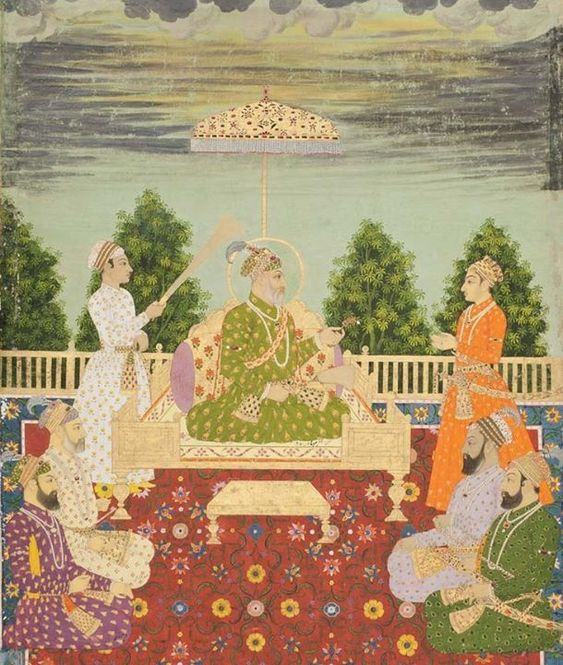
Bahadur Shah I with his sons, a visual reminder that Mughal succession struggles continued deep into the eighteenth century.

Aurangzeb's death at Ahmednagar in March 1707 was followed by a rapid sequence of contested transitions. His three surviving sons Muʿazzam (Bahadur Shah I), Muhammad Azam Shah, and Muhammad Kam Bakhsh fought for the throne; Muʿazzam killed the other two at the Battle of Jajau in June 1707 and near Hyderabad in January 1708 respectively. Bahadur Shah I's own death in 1712 triggered another war among his four sons, won by Jahandar Shah, who was in turn overthrown and killed within months by his nephew Farrukhsiyar. Farrukhsiyar was blinded and strangled by the Sayyid brothers in 1719, and two further princes died on the throne within months before the accession of Muhammad Shah later that year.

Muzaffar Alam argues that, across this period, "the imperial edifice collapsed within forty years after the death of Aurangzeb", in part because of the strain placed on the jagir system by repeated contests and by the habit of jagirdars, the holders of revenue assignments, of "manipulating, first, to cling to their jagirs for a longer period and then to make them their life-term holdings". In the resulting settlement, Alam adds, "it was not the emperor but the nobles in the region who began to dictate state actions". The model of takht ya takhta did not end at a single moment; it faded as the empire's central authority shrank to the area immediately around Delhi.

== Defeat, exile, and captivity ==
The proverb's second term, takhta, implies that defeated contenders die. In practice, defeat produced a wider range of outcomes. Execution was the most common fate in the seventeenth century: Aurangzeb executed Dara and Murad, Shah Jahan's accession had been secured by killings arranged by Asaf Khan, and later emperors followed similar patterns.

Imprisonment was the usual fate when execution was politically awkward. Shah Jahan himself spent the last eight years of his life imprisoned by Aurangzeb in the Agra Fort, supplied with books and paper and permitted limited contact with his daughter Jahanara Begum; the confinement was simultaneously a humane substitute for execution and a lived reminder that the throne's transfer was final. Earlier, Jahangir had blinded Khusrau Mirza rather than execute him outright.

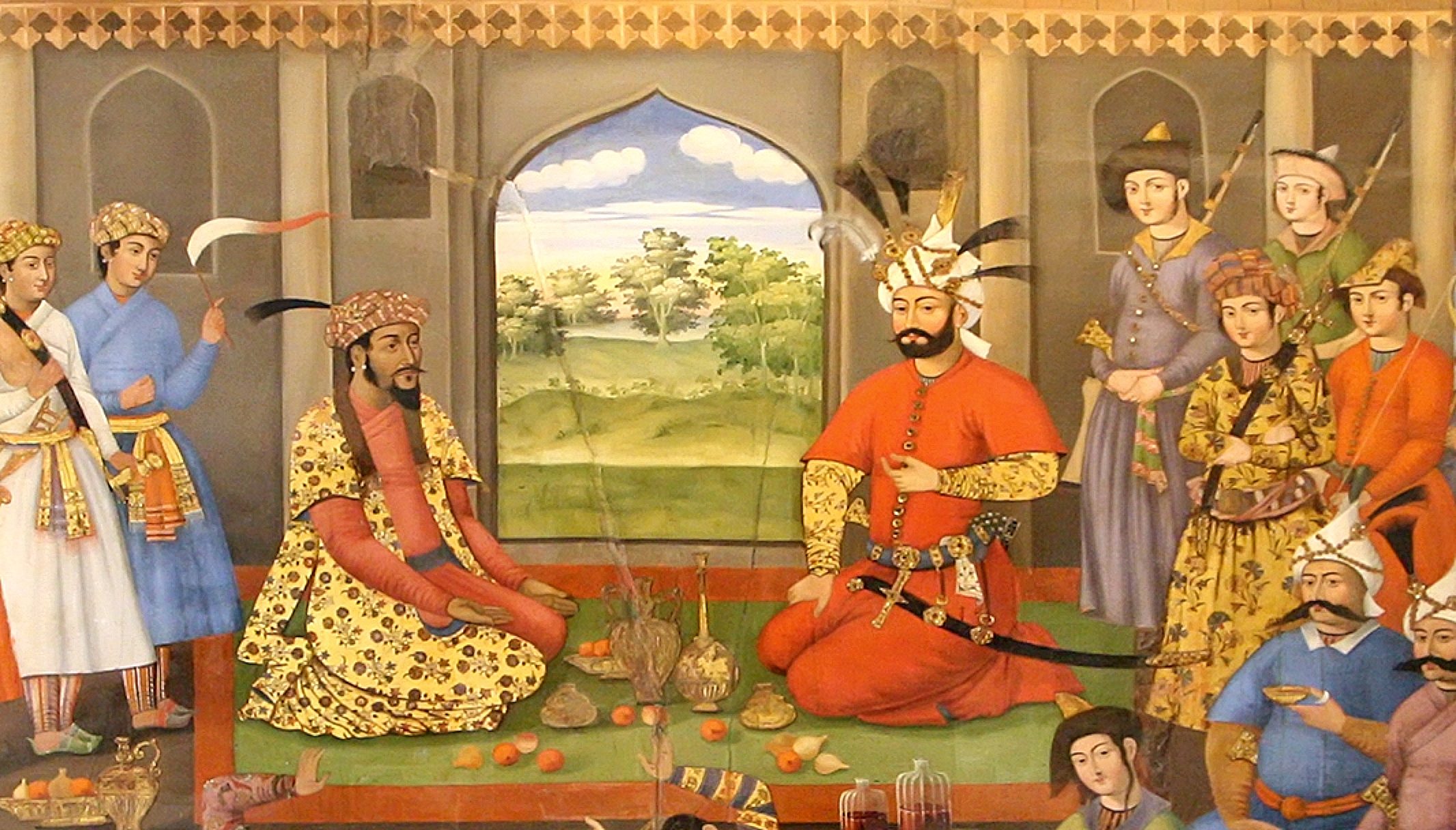
Humayun's meeting with Shah Tahmasp I in 1544, the best-known Mughal example of exile after defeat.

Exile was a third option, more common in the sixteenth century than the seventeenth. Humayun's decade in Safavid Persia (1544–1555) is the canonical instance; Babur's own career before 1526 had been a protracted exile. The Mughal world was crossed by defeated princes, their mothers, and their household retainers moving between Samarkand, Herat, Kandahar, Kabul, and the Persian court. Across these variants the underlying structure held: the prince either won the throne or left the political stage, by one means or another, and returned to the imperial orbit, if at all, only as a memory or a symbol.

== Historiography ==
=== The Aligarh reading ===
The Aligarh tradition of Mughal studies, established in the 1950s under Mohammad Habib and developed by Irfan Habib, Saiyid Nurul Hasan, and M. Athar Ali, treats Mughal politics within a framework drawn from economic history. In this reading, the Mughal state's basic problem was the tension between an expanding revenue demand and an agricultural base of limited productivity; the succession wars appear as ruinous distractions that drained the treasury and destabilised the jagir system. Satish Chandra's work on post-1707 court politics reads in the same key: the frequency of wars of succession after Aurangzeb's death is, in his account, a principal cause of the eighteenth-century financial crisis that emptied the imperial treasury and pushed provincial governors toward autonomy. On this reading, takht ya takhta names a structural weakness that the dynasty never solved and that eventually destroyed it.

=== The revisionist reading ===
A revisionist interpretation, most fully developed by Munis Faruqui in The Princes of the Mughal Empire, 1504–1719 (2012), treats the Mughal system of open succession as a deliberate design. Faruqui argues that Mughal princes were not simply contenders-in-waiting but semi-autonomous political entrepreneurs who built households, recruited nobles, and cultivated regional clients throughout their fathers' reigns. The succession war, on this reading, was the moment at which the empire incorporated these princely networks into its renewed coalition: the victorious prince brought his recruits into Mughal service, and the losers' most capable nobles frequently crossed over to the winner's side. Far from being destructive, the system was, in Faruqui's account, fundamental to the empire's sixteenth- and seventeenth-century expansion and institutional consolidation.

The revisionist reading has been influential but has also been challenged. Critics argue that it understates the destruction of agrarian and commercial infrastructure in contested provinces, that its account of "renewal" of the coalition works better for the sixteenth and early seventeenth centuries than for the eighteenth, and that the system it describes is recognisable chiefly in retrospect, as a set of practices that historians have systematised rather than as a design that contemporaries articulated.

=== Comparative and religious readings ===
A third group of historians has set the Mughal pattern in comparative and religious frames. Stephen Dale's comparative treatment in The Muslim Empires of the Ottomans, Safavids, and Mughals (2010) emphasises that the Mughal practice was not uniquely Mughal but a variant of a shared Turko-Mongol inheritance: the Ottoman and Safavid empires, Dale argues, addressed the same underlying problem differently, with the Ottomans moving by the later sixteenth century toward primogeniture and seclusion of the other royal sons, and the Safavids developing a hybrid system. Ali Anooshahr's study of ghazi-warrior identity in Mughal and Ottoman historiography reads takht ya takhta as belonging to a Persianate political theology of ordeal, in which the ruler's charisma is tested by armed contest and the successful prince's victory is retrospectively framed as a sign of divine favour.

== Modern usage ==
The proverb has retained currency in South Asian political vocabulary long after the Mughal Empire ceased to be an effective political actor. In nineteenth- and early twentieth-century Urdu journalism it was used both as a direct allusion to Mughal history and as a generic idiom for all-or-nothing political contests, and it entered standard dictionaries of Urdu by the end of the nineteenth century.

In contemporary Pakistan, the phrase is particularly associated with commentary on military-political succession. The legal scholar L. Ali Khan, writing in CounterPunch in October 2020, used takht ya takhta as the organising frame for an essay arguing that Pakistan's recurrent imprisonments and exiles of deposed prime ministers reproduce the Mughal succession pattern. Khan glossed the proverb as "get the throne or be killed" and described it as portraying "the history of more than ten centuries of Muslim dynasties, including the Mughals", extending the frame to the Pakistani judiciary and political elite. An Urdu-language volume of political commentary titled Takht ya Takhta was published in Pakistan in 2021.

In Urdu literature and Hindi cinema, the phrase surfaces as shorthand for high-risk political ambition, and it is listed in standard reference works on Urdu proverbs. The persistence of the expression across these registers reflects both the long afterlife of Mughal political imagery in modern South Asia and the cultural weight of the Mughal period as a reservoir of historical analogy.

== Sources ==
- Alam, Muzaffar (1986). The Crisis of Empire in Mughal North India: Awadh and the Punjab, 1707–1748. Delhi: Oxford University Press.
- Anooshahr, Ali (2009). The Ghazi Sultans and the Frontiers of Islam: A Comparative Study of the Late Medieval and Early Modern Periods. London: Routledge.
- Bernier, François (1891). Travels in the Mogul Empire, A.D. 1656–1668. Westminster: Archibald Constable.
- Chandra, Satish (2002). Parties and Politics at the Mughal Court, 1707–1740 (4th ed.). New Delhi: Oxford University Press. ISBN 0195654447.
- Dale, Stephen F. (2010). The Muslim Empires of the Ottomans, Safavids, and Mughals. Cambridge: Cambridge University Press. ISBN 9780521870955.
- Faruqui, Munis D. (2005). "The Forgotten Prince: Mirza Hakim and the Formation of the Mughal Empire in India". Journal of the Economic and Social History of the Orient. 48 (4): 487–523. doi:10.1163/156852005774918796.
- Faruqui, Munis D. (2012). The Princes of the Mughal Empire, 1504–1719. Cambridge: Cambridge University Press. ISBN 9781107022171.
- Habib, Irfan (1999). The Agrarian System of Mughal India, 1556–1707 (2nd ed.). Delhi: Oxford University Press.
- Mukhia, Harbans (2004). The Mughals of India. Oxford: Wiley-Blackwell.
- Richards, John F. (1993). The Mughal Empire. New Cambridge History of India. Vol. I.5. Cambridge: Cambridge University Press.
