= Battle of Khajwa =

1659 battle in Mughal war of succession

Coordinates: 26.052°N 80.524°E

Battle of Khajuha
- Part of Mughal war of succession (1658-1659)
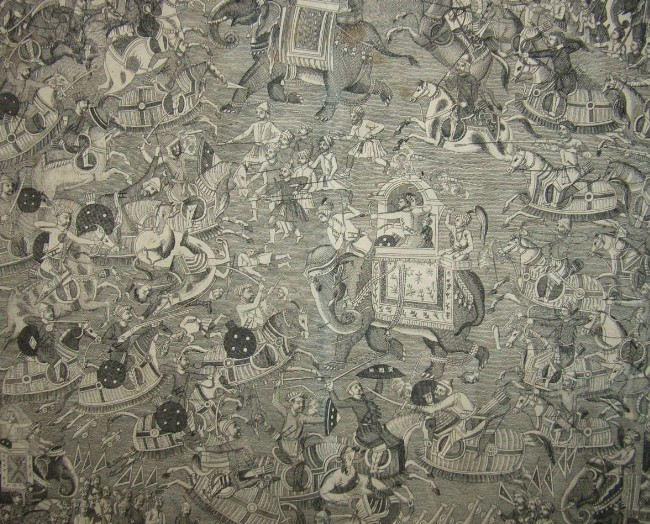
- The Mughal armies of Aurangzeb and Shah Shuja confront each other
Date	5 January 1659
Location	Khajuha
Result	Victory of Aurangzeb
Territorial changes	The newly crowned Mughal Emperor Aurangzeb gains absolute control of the eastern territories of the Mughal Empire.

Belligerents
Aurangzeb	Shah Shuja

Commanders and leaders
Aurangzeb; Mir Jumla II; Islam Khan; Kilich Khan; Shaista Khan; Asad Khan; Muhammad Saleh Kamboh; Haji Shafi Isfahani; Nur Beg; Dur Beg; Rustam Beg	Shah Shuja; Buland Akhtar; Sultan Bang; Zainul Abedin; Mirza Ismail Beg

Strength
90,000; 120 cannons 8,000 war elephants	23,000; 110 cannons 10,000 war elephants

Casualties and losses
11,000	9,000

The Battle of Khajuha was fought on January 5, 1659, between the newly crowned Mughal Emperor Aurangzeb and Shah Shuja who also declared himself Mughal Emperor in Bengal. Shuja's army rested by the tank of Khajwa, about 30 miles to the west of Fatehpur- Haswa in'the Allahabad District, between the Ganges and the Jumna.

== Background ==
Aurangzeb had defeated his elder brother Dara Shikoh during the Battle of Samugarh and captured Agra and placed his frail father Shah Jahan under house arrest in the Agra Fort. Aurangzeb then imprisoned his younger brother and longtime ally Murad Baksh at Gwalior Fort. Aurangzeb then launched an expedition to capture Lahore fearing that Dara Shikoh and his son Suleiman Shikoh both of whom who had fled westward might capture it first. After capturing Lahore and gaining the support of the Muslim Rajputs in the region, Aurangzeb set out on another expedition towards the eastern territories of the Mughal Empire in Bengal with the sole objective of defeating his brother Shah Shuja.

== Commanders ==
Shah Shuja employed European gunners for his cannons. He also purchased many of the latest Matchlocks from the European outposts with whom he enjoyed good relations and in return, offered tax exemptions. Shah Shujas army of 25,000 were commanded by his sons Buland Akhtar, Sultan Bang and Zainul Abedin. But his greatest assets were his 10,000 war elephants and three elite war elephants in particular, which were very well armored in chain mail.

Aurangzeb had a Mughal Army of almost 90,000 his main commanders were Mir Jumla II, who had good knowledge of the region and Islam Khan was given command of the elite cavalry. Aurangzeb chose to split his army into two forces in the main in the front and the other reserve just behind led by Kilich Khan Bahadur and Shaista Khan.

== Location ==
The battle was fought at Khajuha, now a small town in Fatehpur district of Uttar Pradesh. It falls in the middle of the Ganga–Yamuna plains and would have been ideal spot for Shah Shuja's elephants with its large open fields. After the victory, Aurangzeb alamgir also built a memorial named 'Bagh Badshahi' with a large baithak as well as a big inn with two high gates guarding the central road. 'Bagh Badshahi' is now a preserved monument by Archaeological Survey of India.

== Battle ==
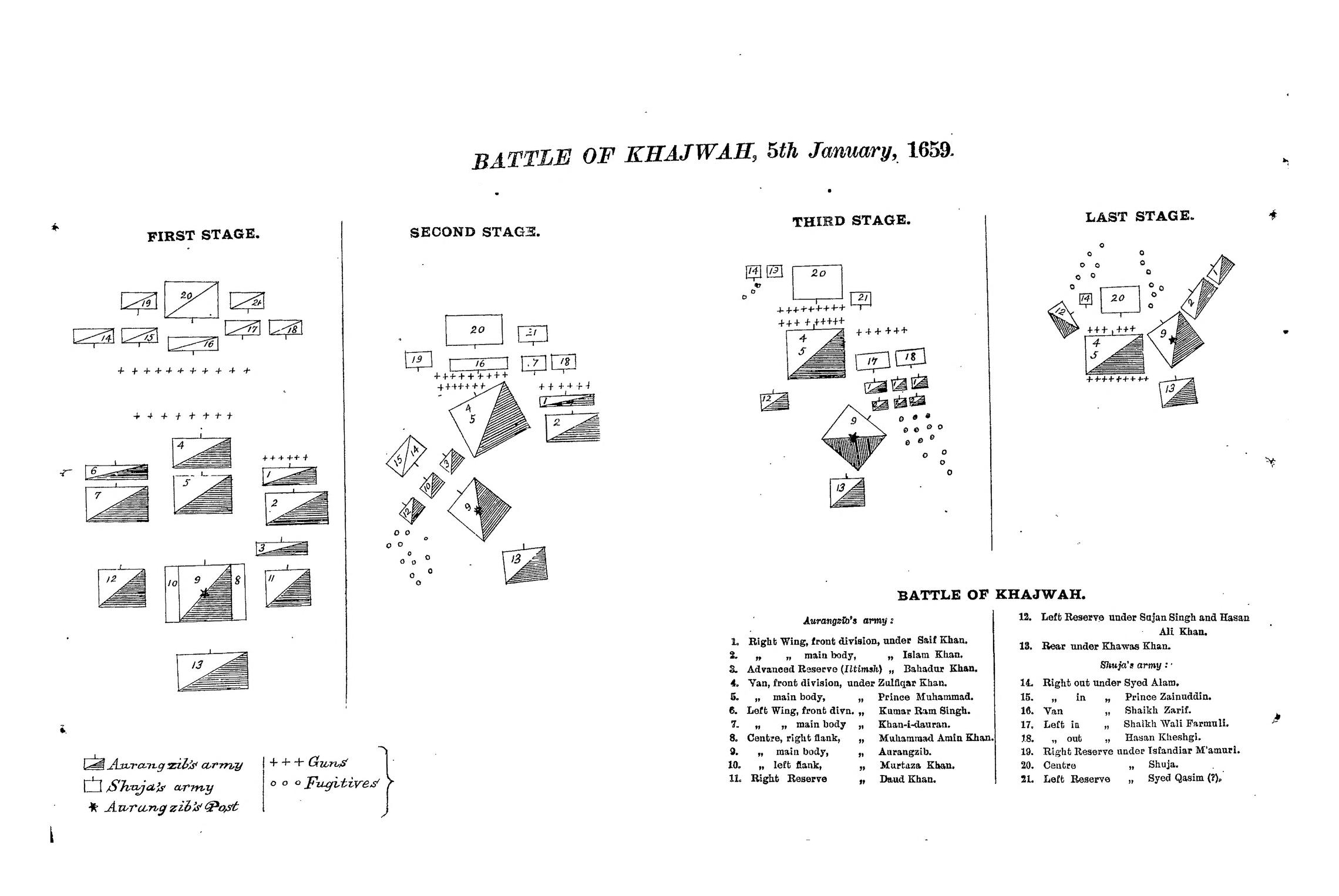
Battle map of Khajwa, 1659.jpg

The armies of Aurangzeb and Shah Shuja fired their cannons at each other until Shah Shuja released his bulky war elephants and believed that his well-trained cannon gunners would reinforce the charge of his war elephants and eliminate any counterattack by Aurangzeb. Bamboo rockets were fired from afar when a war elephant was released and this allowed the coordination and release of other war elephants. This tactic allowed Shah Shuja to gain much control of the battlefield.

But Aurangzeb ordered his front to slightly move behind he ordered his cannons to fire long-range shots and his Matchlock Sepoys to take control of the front and halt the arrival of the incoming War Elephants.

And just when the war elephants collided with Aurangzeb's Sepoys, Shah Shuja ordered his son Buland Akhtar to lead the elite Sowars against the Sepoys of Aurangzeb. Buland Akhtar's attack was aided by the three armored war elephants and their outcome was highly successful. Aurangzeb's cavalry commander Islam Khan himself was nearly killed by a cannonball while his cavalry was absolutely confused against the War elephants and the assault of the rival cavalry led by Buland Akhtar.

Aurangzeb realized the battle was nearly lost and ordered a full-scale attack by his reserves led by Kilich Khan Bahadur and Shaista Khan, the reserve infantry and its Matchlocks then killed many of Shah Shuja's rampaging War elephants and Mir Jumla II then led an advancing Mughal Army to the center of the battlefield braving the artillery of Shah Shuja.

As Kilich Khan Bahadur and Mir Jumla II drew nearer so did Aurangzeb's artillery and his reserve cavalry. Buland Akhtar's exhausted and scattered cavalry now withdrew and regrouped around Shah Shuja's cannons that fired gaps into Aurangzeb's approaching infantry. Aurangzeb himself led his cannons forward and then concentrated their firepower at Shah Shuja's center inflicting much disarray against his rivals.

As Aurangzeb's reserve Sepoys, Sowars and war elephants came very near and began to overrun Shah Shuja's encampment. Shah Shuja first ordered his European gunners to retreat and later ordered his mainly Mughal forces to withdraw, but it was far too late when Aurangzeb's Zamburak and Sepoy led by Kilich Khan Bahadur had them surrounded causing most his forces eventually organize a mass surrender. Shah Shuja himself chose to flee from his Howdah and then rode away conceding the battlefield to his younger brother the new Mughal Emperor Aurangzeb.

== Aftermath ==
The Hindu rulers of Koch Bihar and the Ahoms began to annex rich Mughal territories, while Aurangzeb dispatched the highly experienced Mir Jumla II to chase his brother Shah Shuja, who had fled to Arakan.

Aurangzeb installed Mir Jumla II as the new Subahdar of Bengal the position Shah Shuja had occupied.

== Citation ==
The Decisive Battles of World History PDF Books History books pdf

== Bibliography ==
- Sarkar, Jadunath, ed. (1973) [1912]. History of Aurengzeb Vol 1,2. Orient Longman Limited. OCLC 1223182.
