= Mughal war of succession (1658–1659) =

1658–59 war of succession in the Mughal Empire

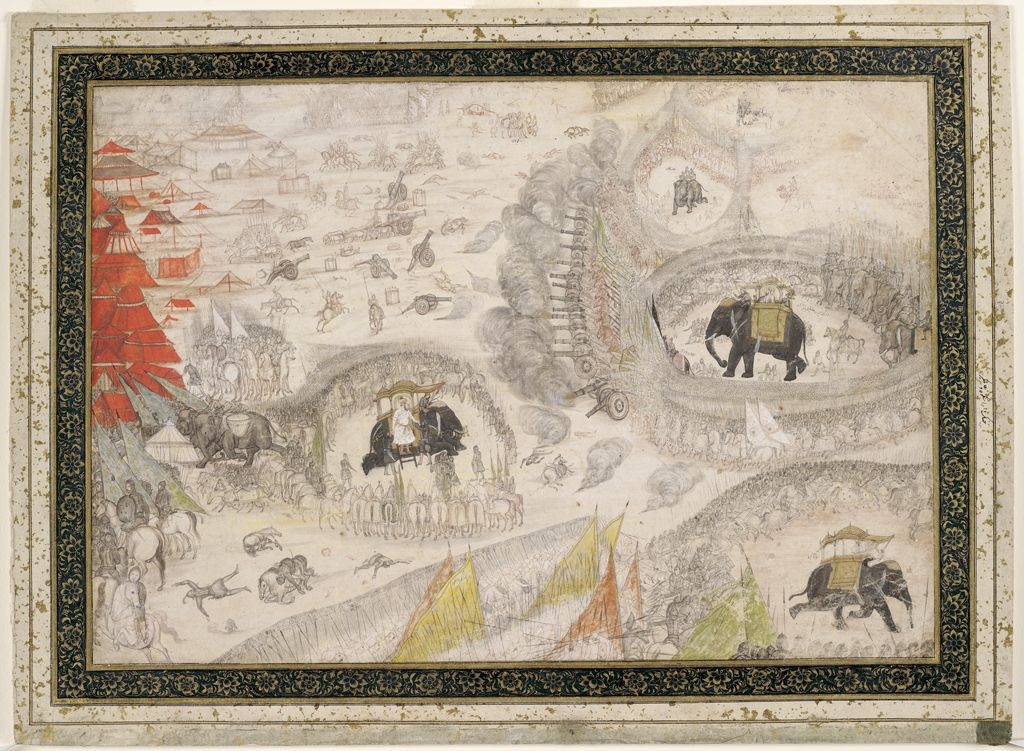
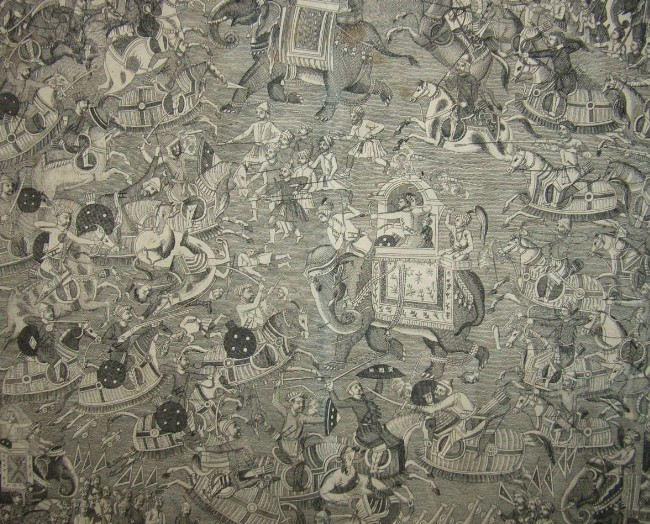
- Battle of Samugarh (Top; 13 May 1658); Battle of Khajwa (Bottom; 5 January 1659)
Date	14 February 1658 – 5 January 1659 (10 months, 3 weeks and 1 day)
Location	Mughal India
Result	Aurangzeb's victory

Belligerents
Aurangzeb's forces Murad Bakhsh's forces	Dara Shikoh's forces	Shah Shuja's forces

Commanders and leaders
Aurangzeb; Murad Bakhsh; Muhammad Sultan; Zulfiqar Khan; Kilich Khan; Multafat Khan; Najabat Khan; Murshid Quli Khan †; Bahadur Khan (WIA); Shaikh Mir; Afghan Allies	Dara Shikoh (executed); Sulaiman Shikoh (executed); Jaswant Singh Rathore; Ratan Singh Rathore †; Rao Chhatrasal Hada †; Mukund Singh Hada †; Rustam Khan †; Qasim Khan; Guru Har Rai	Shah Shuja; Buland Akhtar; Sultan Bang; Zainul Abedin; Mirza Ismail Beg

The Mughal war of succession of 1658–1659 was a war of succession fought among the four sons of Shah Jahan: Aurangzeb, Dara Shikoh, Murad Bakhsh, and Shah Shuja, in hopes of gaining the Mughal Throne. Prior to the death of Shah Jahan, each of his sons held governorships during their father's reign. The emperor favoured the eldest, Dara Shikoh, However, there was resentment among the younger three, who sought at various times to strengthen alliances between themselves and against Dara. There was no Mughal tradition of primogeniture, the systematic passing of rule, upon an emperor's death, to his eldest son. Instead it was customary for sons to overthrow their father and for brothers to war to the death among themselves (takht ya takhta).

Shah Shuja was victorious in the Battle of Bahadurpur. Shuja turned back to Rajmahal to make further preparations. He signed a treaty with his elder brother, Dara, which left him in control of Bengal, Orissa and a large part of Bihar, on 17 May 1658.

Aurangzeb defeated Dara twice (at Dharmat and Samugarh), caught him, executed him on a charge of heresy and ascended the throne. Shuja marched to the capital again, this time against Aurangzeb. A battle took place on 5 January 1659 at the Battle of Khajwa (Fatehpur district, Uttar Pradesh, India), where Shuja was defeated. Ultimately, Aurangzeb was victorious making him the 6th Mughal Emperor.

== Background ==
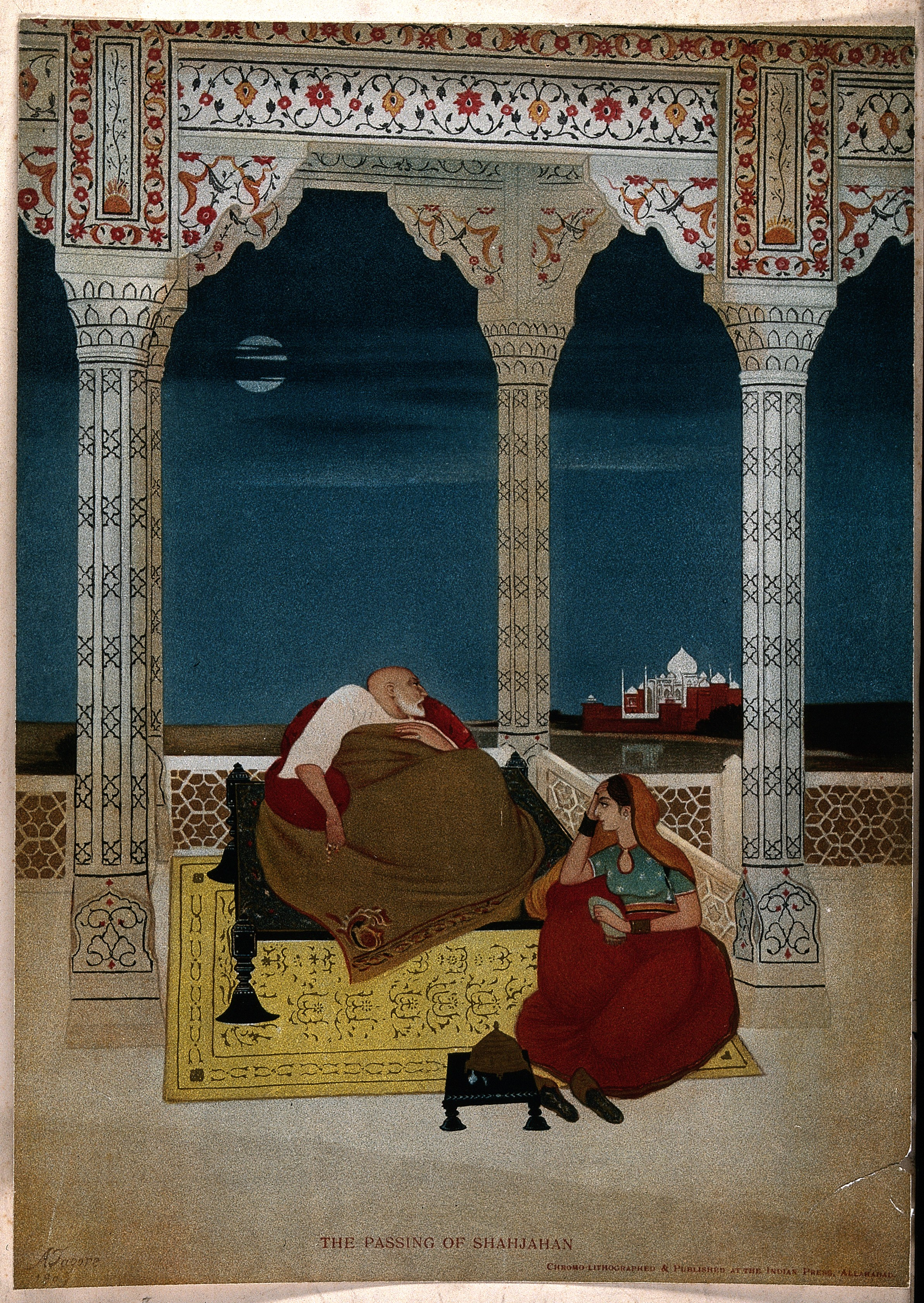
The Passing of Shah Jahan by Abanindranath Tagore c.1902

On 6 September 1657, Shah Jahan was ill with strangury and constipation. He failed to hold Jharokha Darshan and the shops were closed in the bazaars around Delhi. Dara Shikoh was assumed the role of regent in his father's stead, which swiftly incurred the animosity of his brothers. Seizing the opportunity to claim the throne, Prince Shah Shuja, who was the viceroy of Bengal and Orissa rebelled against his father and prince Murad Baksh crowned himself as emperor at Surat. However, as a contrast to both Shuja and Murad, Aurangzeb did not take the irrevocable step of crowning himself. Instead, he engaged in a busy secret correspondence with Murad, and, to a lesser extent, with Shuja. Letters written in cipher encased in bamboo tubes passed from runner to runner over special relay posts newly established between Ahmadabad and Aurangabad. Both of them agreed to a joint action against their brothers. As a result, they decided to divide the ruling Mughal land amongst themselves.(But this wasn't so as Aurangzeb was only seeking his brother's support for claiming the throne for himself and he would later execute Murad, typical of the Mughal fratricidal wars for the throne).

Upon Shah Jahan falling seriously ill, Dara Shikoh took measures to control the flow of information to his three brothers - Shah Shuja in Bengal, Aurangzeb in the Deccan, and Murad Baksh in Gujarat - by halting courtiers on the roads. However, this only exacerbated the situation, leading to widespread rumors across the country. Many believed that the Emperor had already died, and that Dara was concealing this fact to pave his own path to the throne.

Subsequently, the inevitable war of succession began. Shuja and Murad declared themselves as Emperors in their respective provincial seats and started marching towards Delhi with their available troops. Aurangzeb, however, opted for a more subtle approach. He denounced Dara as an apostate from Islam and portrayed his own intentions as merely aiming to free his father from Dara's alleged harmful influence. Aurangzeb forged an alliance with his neighbor Murad, promising to combine their forces for the march to the capital.

== Battle of Bahadurpur (1658) ==
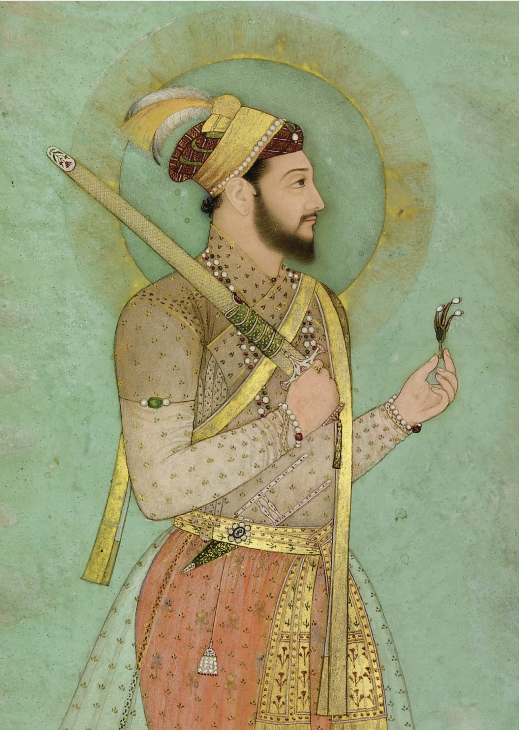
Dara Shikoh

When Shah Jahan recovered and was relocated to Agra, he was informed of the rebellious actions of his three sons. Since they had disobeyed his previous order to return to their respective provinces, he was easily persuaded by Dara to dispatch armies against them. The instructions given to these armies were to persuade or threaten the princes to return to their headquarters, resorting to force only if persuasion failed.

Two armies were dispatched against Aurangzeb and Murad, led by Jaswant Singh and Qasim Khan respectively. They departed from Agra on December 18 and 26. The force sent against Shuja was nominally under Dara's eldest son, Sulaiman Shikoh, with Jai Singh serving as his guardian and aide.

Dara Shikoh dispatched his son Suleiman Shikoh and Jai Singh to confront his brother Shah Shuja, who held the Subahdari of Mughal Bengal. The battle took place at Bahadurpur near Varanasi on 14 February 1658. The Mughal forces led by Suleiman and Jai Singh emerged victorious, compelling Shah Shuja to retreat to Bengal.

Suleiman's troops proceeded to plunder the entire camp. Shah Shuja's losses were estimated at 50 lakhs of rupees, with his chief minister, Mirza Jan Beg, suffering additional losses of six lakhs worth of property, along with horses and elephants. The fleeing prince swiftly set sail and traveled down the river, reaching Patna on February 19. From there, he retreated to Munger (Monghyr), where he halted to prepare for a confrontation against his pursuers.

Through diligent efforts and daily oversight, Shah Shuja oversaw the construction of a two-mile-long wall stretching from the hill to the river, blocking the plain outside the city. This unexpected barrier brought Suleiman to a sudden stop. He hesitated, lingering at Jaipur for several days to secure a safe passage forward with the assistance of local zamindars. After marching 14 miles further east, he set up camp at Surajgarh, located 15 miles southwest of Munger, and took time to devise new plans.

== Battle of Dharmat (1658) ==
After Shah Jahan's illness, his son Aurangzeb proclaimed himself ruler and bestowed titles on his children. By April 3 he crossed the Narmada river towards Ujjain. On April 13th Aurangzeb learned that Murad was nearby, and so he sent word to summon him, and on the next day they camped at Dharmat by the western bank of the Gambhira River.

On 15 April 1658, when the rival hosts sighted each other. The battle began with the usual discharge of artillery, rockets, and muskets at long range. The distance gradually decreased, as Aurangzeb's army advanced slowly, keeping its regular formation. The Rajputs were soon engaged in a close hand-to-hand combat. The Rajputs densely packed within their narrow position, were severely galled by the Burkundazes and archers of the princes’ army from front and flank, without being able to manoeuvre freely and give an effective reply.

The guns and muskets fired at point-blank range and inflicted numerous casualties on the cavalry. The charge had "shaken the division" and killed the Chief of Artillery, but failed in its objective to destroy the guns.

The Rajputs were divided into many mutually antagonistic clans and so did not charge in one compact mass; they were broken up into six or seven bodies, each under its own chieftain and each choosing its own point of attack. Because of this, the force of their impact was divided and weakened as soon as it struck the dense mass of Aurangzib's army.

The Maharajah Jaswant Singh had chosen his position so badly that many of the imperialists standing on the uneven ground could not join in the fight, and many others could not build up the momentum to charge because they were cramped within a narrow space. Half the imperial Van, the Mughal troops under Qasim Khan, rendered no aid to their Rajput comrades now locked in combat with Aurangzeb's Van, and would later be suspected of collusion with the enemy or of antipathy to the Rajputs. The charge of Jaswant's vanguard had not been followed up, and now Aurangzeb's troops, who had parted before the rushing cavalry, closed again behind them and cut off their retreat.

Without support or reinforcement arriving from their own army, the Rajputs were disheartened and began to desert. Their leader Mukund Singh Hada had been killed by an arrow, and all the six Rajput chieftains who had engaged in the charge were slain. Hopelessly outnumbered now, assailed in front, right, and left, and cut off from their rear, the Rajputs were slaughtered. Aurangzeb's gunners, with their pieces mounted on high ground, concentrated their fire on the enemy's centre under Jaswant himself. At the sight of the annihilation of their vanguard, Kai Singh Sisodia from the right flank of the centre, as well as Sujan Singh Bundela and Amar Singh Chandrawat from the van, fled the battlefield with their clansmen and returned home.

The imperialists still had 2,000 Rathors under the banner of Marwar, besides many other Rajput and Mughal auxiliaries. Iftikhar Khan, who fought the reserves with his depleted forces, was slain, and his vanguard was overwhelmed. With the Vanguard of Iftikhar Khan overwhelmed and the Mughal force under Qasim Khan kept aloof during the battle, Jaswant Singh continued to fight for 4 hours despite being wounded, in an attempt to hold the morale of his forces together. According to Ishwardas, he chose the option of charging with his horse towards the enemy to be slain, but he was persuaded by Maheshdas and Askarandas to desist from it, and the reins of his horse were taken from him. Though the battle was lost with the retreat of Jaswant Singh from the battlefield, the military charge was continued by Ratan Singh Rathore until he was slain.

The soldiers of both sides were exhausted by more than eight hours of combat on a hot day in April, and so Aurangzeb forbade pursuit of the retreating imperialists, saying that, "this sparing of human life was his offering (zakat) to Allah." The Muslim prisoners of Jaswant Singhs army were treated with respect, however the Hindus were all slaughtered, even though Aurangzeb himself had several thousand Hindus fighting for him.

The abandoned camp of Jaswant and Qasim Khan was taken by the victorious princes, while their soldiers looted the property, equipment, and baggage of the vanquished army. In addition to the material spoils was the effect of the battle on Aurangzeb's reputation. As Historian Jadunath Sarkar comments:

But far greater than all these material gains was the moral prestige secured by Aurangzeb. Dharmat became the omen of his future success in the opinion of his followers and of the people at large throughout the empire. At one blow he had brought Dara down from a position of immense superiority to one of equality with his own, or even lower. The hero of the Deccan wars and the victor of Dharmat faced the world not only without loss but with his military reputation rendered absolutely unrivalled in India.

Followed by the victory at Dharmat, Aurangzeb marched towards Agra, culminating in the Battle of Samugarh against Dara Shikoh.

== Battle of Samugarh (1658) ==
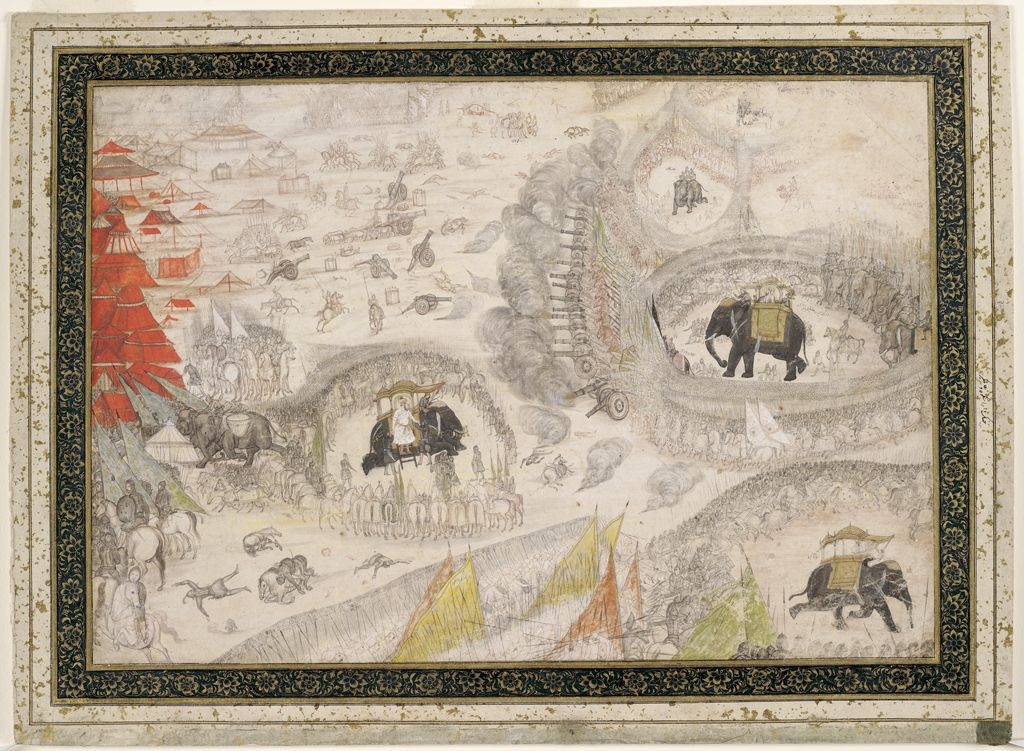
Deception of the Battle of Samugarh. c.1658

After his defeat at the Battle of Dharmat, Dara Shikoh began to retreat towards Samugarh, about 10 miles (16 km) east of Agra, south of the Yamuna River. Aurangzeb and his army then flanked Dara's fortified line along the Chambal River.

Shikoh ordered his cannons to start firing towards the army of Aurangzeb. Eventually, Murad Baksh and his Sowars began a swift charge into the far right flank of Dara Shikoh, commanded by Chatter Sal, without the orders of Aurangzeb. It is believed that Murad Baksh was a sworn enemy of Chattar Sal. They both fought ferociously on the battlefield as the Sowars of Murad Baksh and Murad Baksh killed Ram Singh Rautela.

When Dara Shikoh was informed about the death of Chattar Sal, Murad Baksh, the collapse of the Rajput infantry and the Deccan Sowars, he immediately pushed towards their aid alongside Khalilullah Khan. However, due to Aurangzeb's heavy bombardment, Dara Shikoh decided to join Khalilullah Khan in the Cavalry. Dara Shikoh's army fled to Goindwal where Guru Har Rai had deployed his army, the Akal Sena, to prevent and delay Aurangzeb's army from pursuing Dara Shikoh. When the battle ended Dara Shikoh and Khalilullah Khan fled towards Sulaiman Shikoh and Aurangzeb was declared the new Mughal Emperor.

== Battle of Khajwa (1659) ==
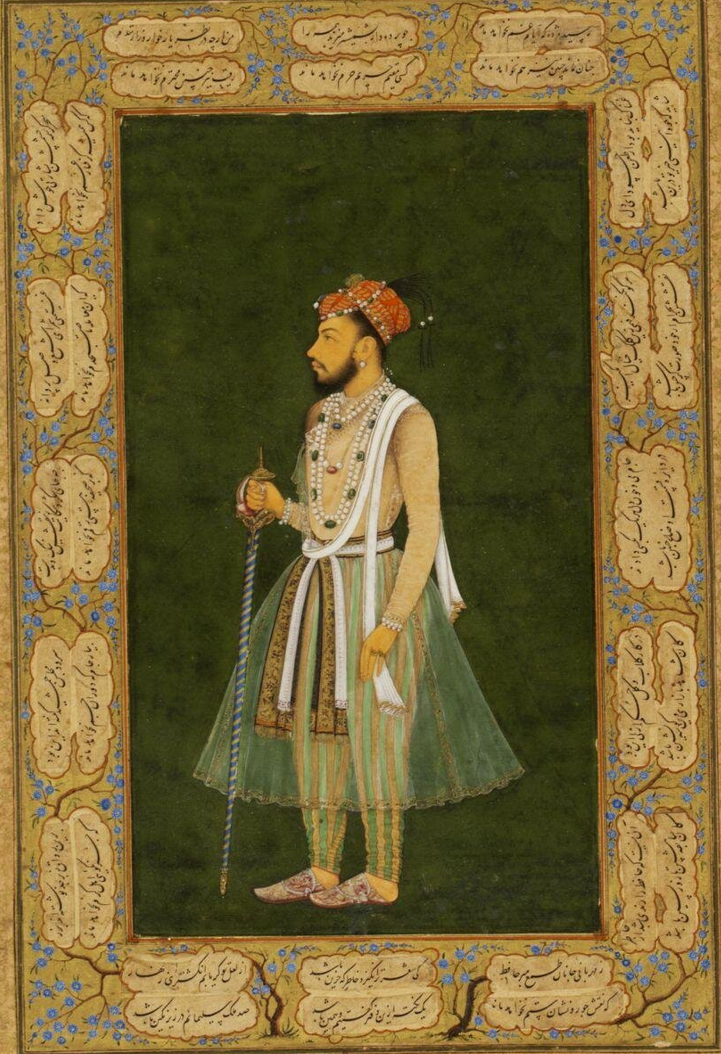
Shah Shuja

After subduing two of his brothers, Dara and Murad, Aurangzeb assembled a massive army to confront his last remaining brother, Shah Shuja, in the Battle of Khajwa. This battle, which took place on January 5, was primarily characterized by an intense artillery exchange, with cannon, rockets, muskets, and hand grenades being employed extensively by both sides. With the arrival of Mir Jumla, preparations on the imperial side were accelerated. On January 3, Aurangzeb, likely following Mir Jumla's counsel, organized his forces and assigned each division its designated position.

The battle ensued between Aurangzeb and Shah Shuja, resulting in the defeat of Shah Shuja's army, which subsequently surrendered as Shuja fled the battlefield. Determined to eliminate any potential threats to his claim to the throne, Aurangzeb pursued Shah Shuja relentlessly. Faced with bleak prospects and the fear of public execution if captured alive, Shah Shuja abandoned Bengal permanently and sought refuge in Arakan.

== Confinement of Shah Jahan ==
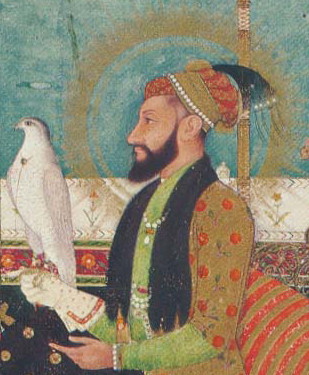
Aurangzeb

Jahanara Begum Sahib, Mumtaz Mahal's eldest surviving daughter, voluntarily shared his 8-year confinement and nursed him in his dotage. In January 1666, Shah Jahan fell ill. Confined to bed, he became progressively weaker until, on 30 January, he commended the ladies of the imperial court, particularly his consort of later years Akbarabadi Mahal, to the care of Jahanara. Shah Jahan died on 22 January of that year, aged 74. Shah Jahan's chaplain Sayyid Muhammad Qanauji and Kazi Qurban of Agra came to the fort, moved his body to a nearby hall, washed it, enshrouded it, and put it in a coffin of sandalwood.

== See also ==
- Mughal war of succession (1707–1709)

== Sources ==
- Ahmad, Tasneem, ed. (1978). Futuhāt-I-Alamgiri of Ishwardas Nagar. Idarāh-I-Adabiyā-I-Dilli Ltd. OCLC 313077940.
- Eraly, Abraham (2000). Emperors of the Peacock Throne: The Saga of the Great Mughals. Penguin Books India. ISBN 978-0141001432.
- Richards, John F. (1993). The Mughal Empire. The New Cambridge History of India. Vol. V. Cambridge University Press. ISBN 978-0521566032.
- Sarkar, Jadunath, ed. (1973) [1912]. History of Aurengzeb Vol 1, 2. Orient Longman Limited. OCLC 1223182.
