= Maharajah Jai Singh =

Maharajah Jai Singh may refer to:

- Jai Singh I (1611 – 1667), ruler of the kingdom of Amber (later called Jaipur)
- Jai Singh II of Amber (1688 - 1743), ruler of the kingdom of Amber (later called Jaipur)
