= Burkundaz =

Indian mercenaries

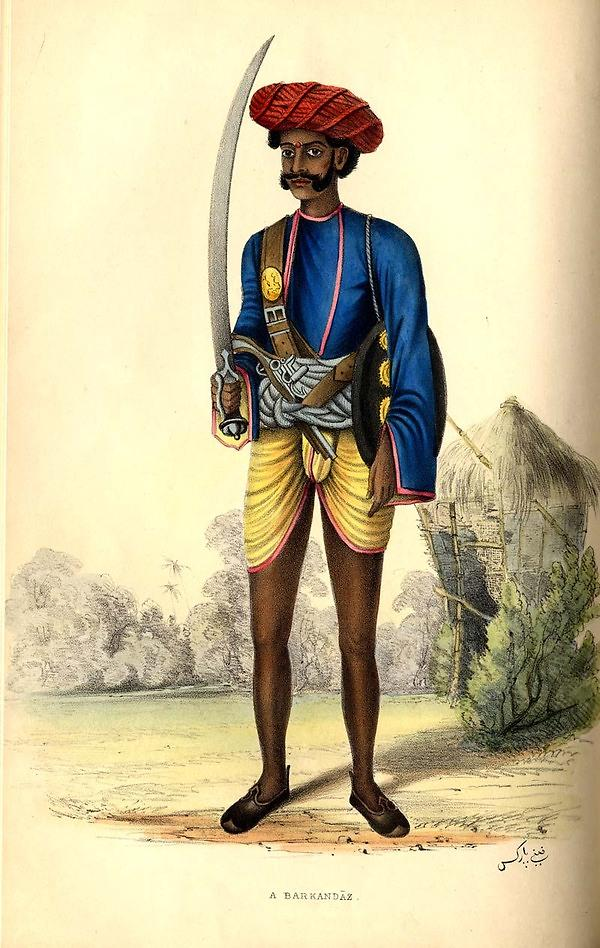
A Barkandaz (1850) by Fanny Parkes

A Burkundaz (bur·kun·daz ¦bərkən¦däz) (also Barqandaze, Barkandaze, Barqandāz, Barq-andaz, Barqandaaz, or Barkandaz) was a type of Hindustani mercenary matchlock-man in India during the 17th, 18th, and 19th centuries, during the Mughal and British colonial period. Burkundazes were usually the former soldiers of Muslim armies or Zamindars (landlords), who turned to mercenary work after their armies disbanded.

Burkundazes typically carried matchlock firearms, from which their name derives, (lit. "lightning thrower.") The term was originally used to refer to Mughal foot corps of musketeers, but mounted musketeers were also sometimes referred to as burkundazes. A burkundaz recruit would usually offer his service with a matchlock and a sword, which relieved his employers of the necessity of supplying weapons.

By the end of Aurangzeb's reign in 1707 the burkundazes formed a distinct corps organized in decimal order. Their captains were referred to by their Turkish designation yuz-bashi (commandant of 100) or bing-bashi (commandant of 1000.) In contrast to other units the captain of 10 was omitted, and the primary unit was 100.

Burkundazes came from a variety of religious and ethnic backgrounds including Sikhs, Rajputs, Muslims, and Sanyasis. As mercenaries, they could be found employed by the Mughal government, Zamindars, rebelling nobles, and later the East India Company. They would occasionally operate as independent forces working for themselves, raiding and plundering the civilian population.

== Etymology ==
The word comes from Persian, from barq, meaning "lightning" plus andāz- "thrower, scatterer", meaning "lightning-throwers."

Oxford English Dictionary's earliest evidence for use of the word "Burkundaz" in English is from 1785, in Annual Register 1783.

== History ==
During the Mughal war of succession burkundazes made up a part of the army of Aurangzeb, which defeated the armies of his elder brother Dara Shikoh twice, at the Battle of Dharmat on April 15, 1658 and later at the Battle of Samugarh on May 29, 1658.

They were deputed to serve in Rajputana during the Rathore rebellion (1679 to 1707) under their own corps officers, who were in turn made subordinate to Mughal nobles.

Burkundazes would later be heavily involved in destabilizing the Ahom kingdom during the late 18th and early 19th centuries. They served as armed mercenaries and raiders in uprisings such as the Moamaria rebellion and Haradatta Choudhury's revolt in lower Assam.

In 1791, Krishnanarayan, the Raja of Darrang and Kamrup, appealed to the authorities in Calcutta to reinstate him to his hereditary position. When this was denied, Krishnanarayan recruited a mercenary force of 3,000, composed of Burkundazes, Sannyasis, and Fakirs.

King Gaurinath Singha negotiated with Krishnanarayan, and issued a warrant that the burkundazes under his command were to vacate Assamese territories. Krishnanarayan found the terms acceptable, but was prevented from accepting by his burkundazes, "whose plundering activities would cease with the cessation of hostilities; all the more a huge amount of arrears had to be paid before any settlement." King Gaurinath then turned to the East India Company for military aid.

The British government sent a force under the command of Captain Welsh, but authorized them to take hostile measures only against the burkundazes. Captain Welsh issued a decree to the burkundazes, demanding that they come to Guwahati within ten days or face repercussions. The burkundazes professed obedience but asked to be given more time. Convinced they did not intend to obey, Welsh expelled the burkundazes from north Guwahati, and the government of Bengal ordered the imprisonment of the families of the burkundazes.

Krishnanarayan and his forces raided the countryside. Captain Welsh sent a detachment against him, and defeated him at Kalitaknchi, in Darrang. Most of the burkundazes then abandoned Krishnanarayan, though the Sannyasis remained loyal to him. The burkundazes continued to fight but were expelled from Kamrup and Darrang. They took refuge in Bhutan and carried on sporadic raids into the plains of Assam.
