= Asif Khan =

Asif Khan may refer to:

- Asif Khan (actor) (born 1943), Pakistani actor
- Asif Khan (Hong Kong cricketer) (born 1989), Hong Kong cricketer
- Asif Khan (Indian cricketer) (born 1992), Indian cricketer
- Asif Khan (Emirati cricketer) (born 1990), Pakistani cricketer
- Asif Khan (Peshawar politician), Pakistani politician from Peshawar
- Asif Khan (Waziristan politician), Pakistani politician from Waziristan
- Asif Hossain Khan, Bangladeshi sport shooter
- Asif Muhammad Khan, Indian politician
- Abu'l-Hasan Asaf Khan (1569–1641), Grand Vizier of the Mughal emperor Shah Jahan from 1628 to 1641, father of Mumtaz Mahal and brother of Nur Jahan (chief consort of emperor Jahangir)
  - Tomb of Asif Khan, his tomb in Lahore, Pakistan; next to those of Nur Jahan and Jahangir
- Asif Ali Haider Khan, recipient of the Sangeet Natak Akademi Award for theatre

== See also ==
- Asaf Khan (disambiguation)
