= Battle of Dharmat =

Battle during the Mughal war of Succession (1658–1659)

- Part of Mughal war of succession (1658–1659)
Date	15 April 1658
Location	Fatehabad near the village of Dharmat, located close to the city of Ujjain, Madhya Pradesh
Result	Aurangzeb's victory

Belligerents
Aurangzeb's Forces	Dara Shikoh's allies

Commanders and leaders
Aurangzeb; Murad Baksh; Muhammad Sultan; Multafat Khan; Najabat Khan; Murshid Quli Khan †	Jaswant Singh (WIA); Mukund Singh Hada †; Ratan Singh Rathore †; Rajranveer Pratap Singh I †

Strength
30,000	22,272 armymen along with cavalry 266 Mansabdārs

Casualties and losses
7,000 Horsemen; 4,000 Mansabdārs; 100 Nobles Total 11,100	At least 6,000 Rajputs (as computed by Jadunath Sarkar)

The Battle of Dharmat was fought during the Mughal war of succession (1658–1659) by Aurangzeb against Jaswant Singh Rathore who was allied with the Mughal prince Dara Shikoh. The battle was fought on the open plain of Dharmat on the Summer day of 15 April 1658, in which Aurangzeb won a decisive victory due to advantage in imperial artillery and tactics.

== Background ==
On 6 September 1657, Emperor Shah Jahan suddenly fell ill due to strangury and constipation. He failed to hold the ceremony of Jharokha Darshan and the shops were closed in the bazaars around Delhi. Citizenry speculated whether the emperor was dead or held hostage by his son Dara. Only some physicians, Dara, and his sister Jahanara were physically allowed to see him. Shah Jahan was able to recover completely from his illness, but it would still prove costly for him. Seizing the opportunity to claim the throne, Prince Shah Shuja, who was the viceroy of Bengal and Orissa, rebelled against his father, and prince Murad Baksh crowned himself as emperor at Surat. In contrast to Shuja and Murad, Aurangzeb did not immediately crown himself, but instead engaged in a busy secret correspondence with Murad, and, to a lesser extent, with Shuja. Letters written in cipher encased in bamboo tubes were passed from runner to runner over special relay posts newly established between Ahmadabad and Aurangabad. Both of them agreed to a joint action against their brothers. As a result, they decided to divide the ruling Mughal land amongst themselves.

On February 5, 1658, Aurengzeb left Aurangabad to contest the Mughal Throne. He proclaimed himself ruler and bestowed titles on his children. By April 3 he crossed the Narmada river towards Ujjain. On April 13 he learned that Murad was nearby, so Aurangzeb summoned him, and on the next day they camped at Dharmat by the western bank of the Gambhira River.

== Preparation ==
The Imperial forces under Raja Jaswant Singh of Marwar had reached Malwa at the orders of Dara Shikoh by February 1658, but the Raja was still unaware of the movements of Aurangzeb. At first, Jaswant's army blocked Murad from Karchraud near Ujjain, but Murad avoided battle by taking a detour around Karchraud to join Aurangzeb. Jaswant was shocked to learn Aurangzeb was already in Malwa. Aurangzeb sent a Brahmin envoy, Kavi Rai to advise Jaswant to desist from battle and allow Aurangzeb to go to Delhi to see his father. Jaswant tried to parley with Aurangzeb, as he thought that the enormous strength of the imperial forces would be enough to dissuade both princes to stop their rebellion and return to their domains.

Shah Jahan's orders to Jaswant were to take every possible step to induce the two princes to retire. If they declined to listen, they were to be stopped by force. Jadunath Sarkar summarises the dilemma faced by Jaswant Singh in his words:

At all times, a subject opposing two princes of the blood, a servant fighting for a distant master against two chiefs who acknowledge no higher authority than their own will, is severely handicapped. In Jaswant's case the natural inferiority of his position was aggravated by the commands he had received from Shah Jahan—Jadunath Sarkar

Although Jaswant's army was similar in size to the combined force of the princes, it was divided by internal conflict. The various Rajput clans were often divided from each other by hereditary feuds and quarrels about dignity and precedence, in addition to the already present religious conflict between Hindus and Muslims. Unlike Jai Singh, Jaswant was not able to make his army act as an organized whole.

Jaswant Singh was blamed by his contemporaries for being inept and inexperienced. The ground where Jaswant took his stand was narrow and uneven, with ditches and swamps on its flanks. This prevented his horsemen from maneuvering freely, or gathering momentum for a charge. One historian asserts that Jaswant had deliberately poured water on 200 yards of ground in front of him and trodden it into mud, evidently to arrest the enemy's charge. His position was also surrounded by trenches thrown up during the previous day, as a standard precaution against night attacks. He failed to send timely support to the divisions that needed it most, and once the battle began, his control over his forces quickly broke down. One of the chiefs under Jaswant, Askarandas advised him to make an early attack on the European gunners who manned the artillery pieces of Aurangzeb in a night raid, but Jaswant Singh refused, as he thought that it was "below the dignity of a Rajput to attack the foe when they are unarmed."

== Battle ==
=== The charge of the Rajputs ===
The battle began approximately two hours before sunrise, on 15 April 1658, with the discharge of artillery, rockets, and muskets at long range. Aurangzeb's army advanced slowly, keeping its regular formation, and the Rajputs were soon engaged in a close hand-to-hand combat. The Rajputs, densely packed within their narrow position, were harried by the Burkundazes (mercenary soldiers) and archers of the princes’ army from the front and flank, without being able to manoeuvre freely to give an effective reply, and began to take heavy losses.

The Rajput leaders of the Vanguard- Mukund Singh Hada, Ratan Singh Rathor, Dayal Singh Jhala, Arjun Singh Gaur, Sujan Singh Sisodia and others, moved forward, leading a cavalry charge. Shouting their war- cry of Ram Ram, they "fell on the enemy like tigers, casting away all plan." The Rajput charge aimed to destroy Aurangzeb's artillery. The guns and muskets fired at point-blank range, inflicting numerous casualties on the cavalry. The charge succeeded in killing Murshid Quli Khan, the Chief of Artillery, but failed to destroy the majority of the guns.

Aurengzeb's vanguard was composed of his most elite troops, "eight thousand mail-clad warriors," many of them hereditary fighters of the Afghan tribe. Muhammad Sultan, Najabat Khan, and other commanders of the Van, on their elephants, "kept their ground like hills, while the flood of Rajput charge raged round and round them in eddies." The close combat was so heavy that "the ground was dyed crimson with blood like a tulip-bed."

Because the Rajputs were divided into many mutually antagonistic clans, they were broken up into six or seven bodies, each under its own chieftain and each choosing its own point of attack. Thus the force of their impact was divided and weakened when it struck the mass of Aurangzib's Vanguard.

Many of the imperialists standing on the uneven ground could not join in the fight, and many others could not charge by reason of their being cramped within a narrow space. Half the imperial Van, viz., the Mughal troops under Qasim Khan, rendered no aid to their Rajput comrades as they struggled with Aurangzeb's troops, and were suspected of collusion with the enemy, or of antipathy to the Rajputs. The charge of Jaswant's vanguard was not followed up. Aurangzeb's troops, who had parted before the charging Rajputs, closed again behind them, and thus cut off their retreat.

=== Heavy losses for the Rajputs ===
Aurangzeb's advanced reserve was pushed up to reinforce the van, and he himself moved forward with the centre to form a wall of support behind them. Shaikh Mir and Saf Shikan Khan, with the right and left wings of the centre, struck the Rajputs from both flanks while they were engaged with Aurangzib's van in front.

Greatly outnumbered, assailed in front, right, and left, and cut off from their rear, the Rajputs were slaughtered. Mukund Singh Hada, their leader, was killed by an arrow through the eye, and all six Rajput chieftains that had engaged in the charge had been slain. Aurangzeb's gunners, with their pieces mounted on high ground, concentrated their fire on the enemy's centre, under Jaswant himself. Without support or reinforcement arriving from their own army, the Rajputs were disheartened, and some began to desert the battlefield. Kai Singh Sisodia from the right flank of the centre, and Sujan Singh Bundela and Amar Singh Chandrawat from the van, left the battlefield with their clansmen and returned home.

The imperialists still had 2,000 Rathors under the banner of Marwar, besides many other Rajput and Mughal auxiliaries. Iftikhar Khan, who fought the reserves with his depleted forces, was slain, and his vanguard was overwhelmed. Jaswant Singh continued to fight for 4 hours despite being wounded, in an attempt to hold the morale of his forces together. According to Ishwardas, he chose the option of charging with his horse towards the enemy to be slain, but he was persuaded by Maheshdas and Askarandas to desist, and he retreated.

=== Last stand of the imperialists ===
Though the battle was lost with the retreat of Jaswant Singh from the battlefield after his continuous severe wounds, the military charge was continued by Ratan Singh Rathore till his death. His actions led to him being considered a folk hero by the people of Rajasthan.

== Aftermath ==
The soldiers of both sides were exhausted by more than eight hours of combat on a hot day in April. Because of this, Aurangzeb forbade pursuit of the retreating imperialists, saying that "this sparing of human life was his offering (zakat) to Allah." The Muslim prisoners of Jaswant Singhs army were treated with respect, however the Hindus were all slaughtered, even though Aurangzeb himself had several thousand Hindus fighting for him.

The abandoned camp of Jaswant and Qasim Khan with all their artillery, tents, and elephants, as well as a vast amount of treasure, were taken by the victorious princes, while their soldiers looted the property, equipment, and baggage of the vanquished army. Lines of camels and mules, laden with various articles, were pillaged by the common soldiers and camp followers.

In addition to the material spoils was the effect of the battle on Aurangzeb's reputation. As Historian Jadunath Sarkar comments:

But far greater than all these material gains was the moral prestige secured by Aurangzeb. Dharmat became the omen of his future success in the opinion of his followers and of the people at large throughout the empire. At one blow he had brought Dara down from a position of immense superiority to one of equality with his own, or even lower. The hero of the Deccan wars and the victor of Dharmat faced the world not only without loss but with his military reputation rendered absolutely unrivalled in India.

Followed by the victory at Dharmat, Aurangzeb marched towards Agra, culminating in the Battle of Samugarh against Dara.

== Bibliography ==
- Sarkar, Jadunath, ed. (1973) [1912]. History of Aurengzeb Vol 1,2. Orient Longman Limited. OCLC 1223182.
- Ahmad, Tasneem, ed. (1978). Futuhāt-I-Alamgiri of Ishwardas Nagar. Idarāh-I-Adabiyā-I-Dilli Ltd. OCLC 313077940.
- Richards, John F, ed. (1993). The Mughal Empire. Cambridge University Press. ISBN 9780511584060.
- Upadhyaya, Rashmi, ed. (2010). ""The Position of Charans in Medieval Rajasthan"" (PDF). Rajasthan History Congress.
