= Jai Singh I =

Maharaja of Amber from 1621 to 1667

Amir-ul-Umara Mirza Raja Jai Singh I
- Raja
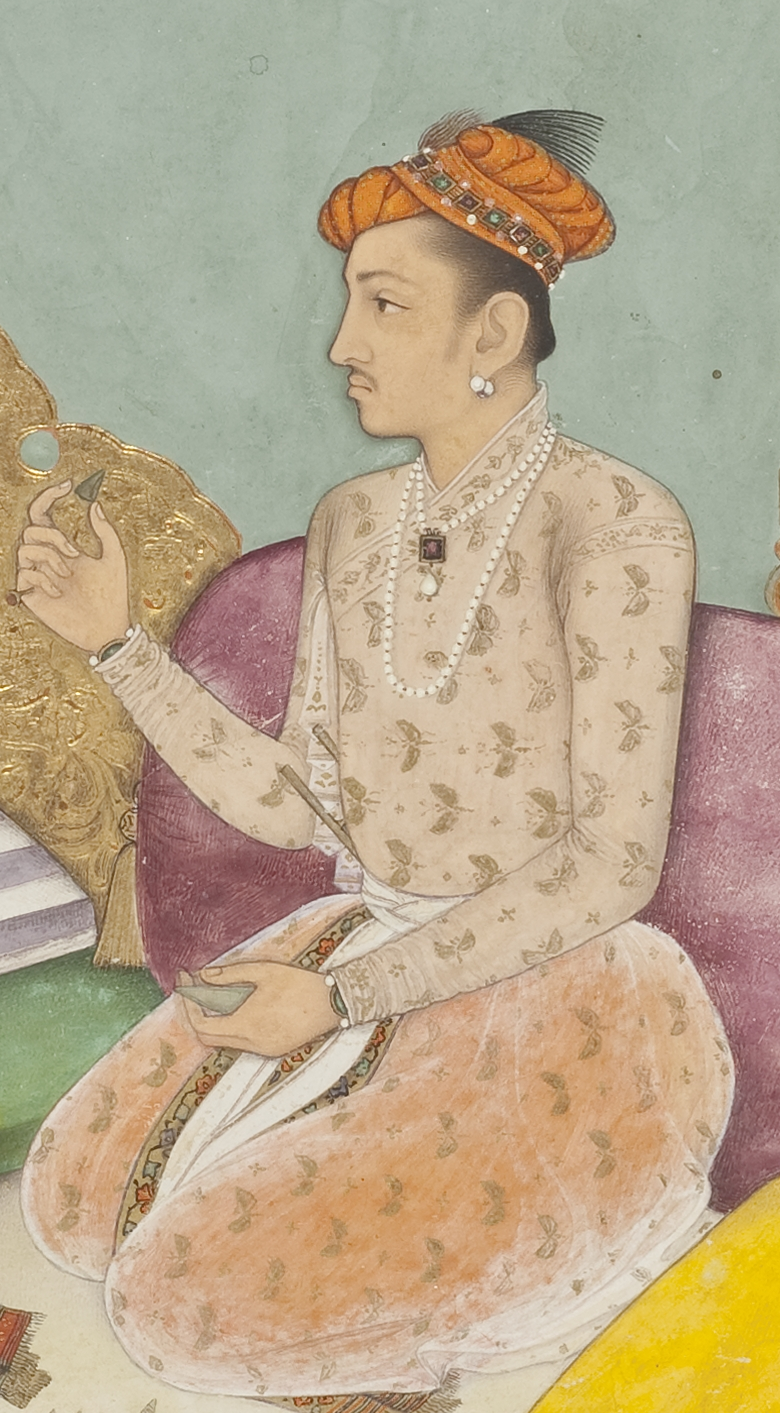
- Portrait of Raja Jai Singh I from a Mughal folio

Raja of Amber
- Reign: 13 December 1621 – 28 August 1667
- Predecessor: Bhau Singh
- Successor: Ram Singh I
- Born: 15 July 1611; Amber, Kingdom of Amber (present-day Rajasthan, India)
- Died: 28 August 1667 (aged 56); Burhanpur, Khandesh Subah, Mughal Empire (present-day Madhya Pradesh, India)
- Spouse: Rathorji (Jodhawatji) Mrig Kanwarji d.of Sur Singh of Marwar; Jadonji Anand Kanwarji d.of Raja Mukund Das of Karauli; Chandrawatji Roop Kanwarji of Rampura; Rathorji (Bikawatji) Har Kanwarji d.of Kunwar Kishan Singh and grand-daughter of Raja Rai Singh of Bikaner; Chauhanji Raj Kanwarji
- Issue: Ram Singh I Kirat Singh; Hari Singh; Vijay Singh; Bal Singh
- House: Kachhwaha
- Father: Yuvraj Maha Singh
- Mother: Sisodiniji Damyanti Deiji d.of Kunwar Shakti Singh and grand-daughter of Maharana Udai Singh II of Mewar
- Religion: Hinduism

Mirza Raja Jai Singh I (15 July 1611 – 28 August 1667) was the Kachhwaha ruler of the Kingdom of Amber as well as a senior most general and a high-ranking mansabdar at the imperial court of Mughal Empire. His predecessor was his grand uncle, Mirza Raja Bhau Singh, the younger son of Mirza Raja Man Singh I.

== Early life ==
Jai Singh was born to Maha Singh and his wife Damiyanti, the granddaughter of Udai Singh II of Mewar.

== Accession and early career ==
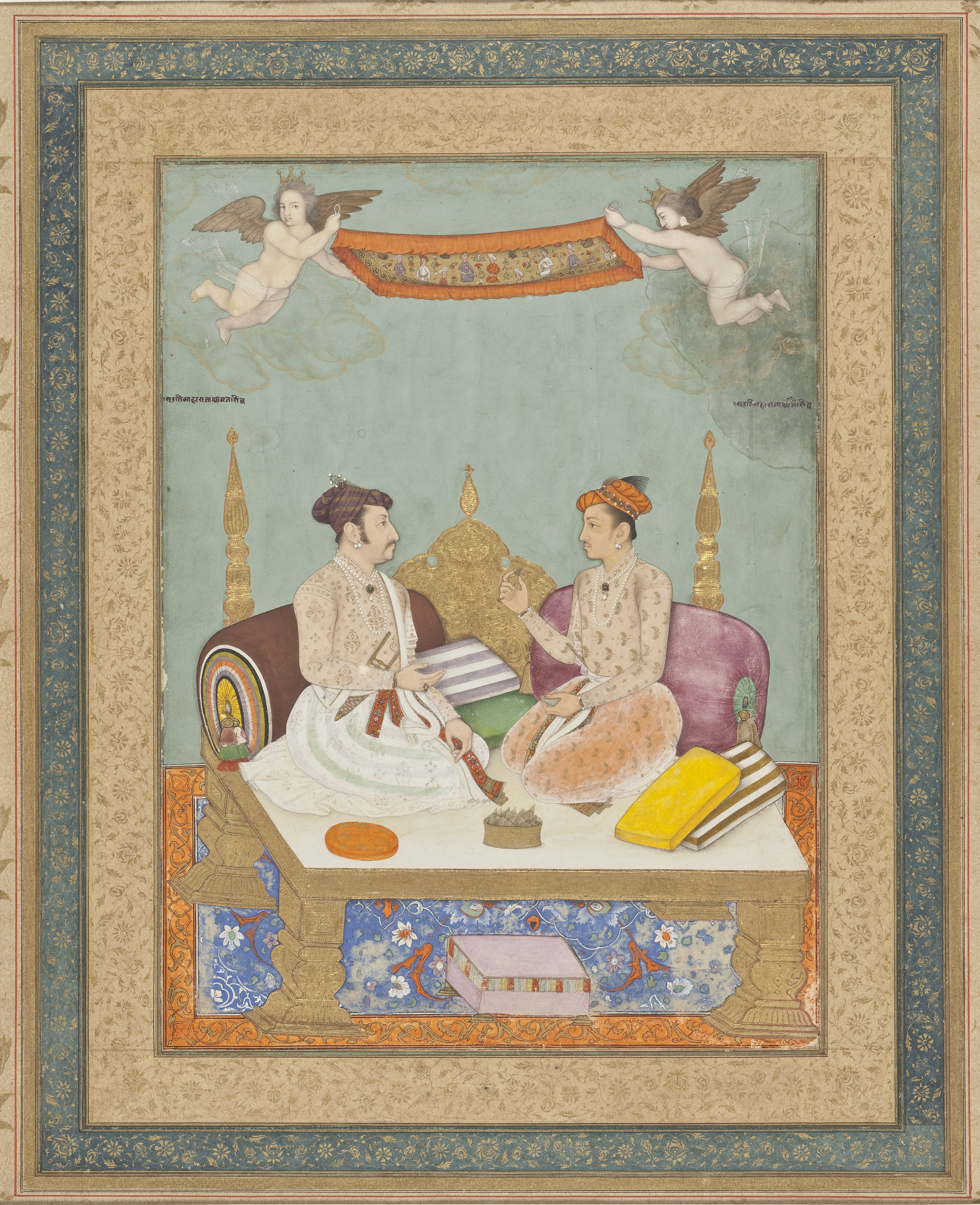
Maharaja Jai Singh of Amber and Maharaja Gaj Singh I of Marwar - Folio from the Amber Album, c. 1630.

At the age of 10, Jai Singh became the Raja of Amber and the head of the Kachhwaha Rajputs. His military career spans the full reign of Shah Jahan and the first decade of Aurangzeb's reign.

Jai Singh's military career began during the accession of Shah Jahan as the Mughal emperor in 1627. Taking advantage of the change in sovereigns, Jai Singh's commander in the Deccan, Khan Jahan Lodi, rebelled with his Afghan followers. However, Jai Singh brought away his own army to the north and then joined the campaign to defeat the rebels. Jai Singh was made a commander of 4000 for his service.

Jai Singh, attached to Abdullah Khan's division, pursued Khan Jahan Lodi after he fled to the Deccan, accompanied by some of his followers.

In 1630, Jai Singh fought in the Battle of Bir against Jahan Khan Lodi. In the end, the Afghans were routed, the Mughals pursued them, and Lodi was killed by Madho Singh Hada.

=== Campaign against Bijapur and Gond kingdoms ===
The following year, Jai Singh served in the expedition against the Sultanate of Bijapur under Asaf Jahan but their campaign was thwarted by the Deccan famine of 1630–1632. In 1633, Jai led the Rajput vanguard in the second expedition against Parenda. Shahaji was out on a raid near Daulatabad when he encountered a Mughal contingent. In the ensuing Battle of Parenda (1634), Shahaji was defeated and fled while being pursued by Jai Singh. Jadunath Sarkar states that Jai Singh captured "8,000 oxen loaded with provisions, arms, and rockets, besides 3,000 men" from the enemy. For this, he was made the commander of five thousand.

In 1636 Shah Jahan organized a grand campaign against the Deccan sultanates in which Jai Singh played a leading part, serving as the leader of the Rajput vanguard in the invasion of Bijapur. Later this same army was sent to campaign against the Gond kingdoms. For his part in these successful ventures Jai Singh was promoted to the rank of five-hazari and given equal number of troops under his control and the Chatsu district in Ajmer was added to his kingdom. By defeating the Meo robber tribes in the north of Amber, Jai Singh further increased the size of his ancestral kingdom. In 1641 he subdued the rebellion of Raja Jagat Singh Pathania of the hill-state of Mau-Paithan (Himachal Pradesh).

== Central Asian campaigns ==
In 1638 the fort of Kandahar was surrendered by its Safavid Persian commander, Ali Mardan Khan, to Shah Jahan. The emperor's son Shah Shuja, accompanied by Jai Singh, was sent to take possession of the important fort. To overawe the Persian Shah from interfering in this task, Shah Jahan assembled a 50,000 strong army in Kabul. On this occasion Jai Singh received the unique title of Mirza Raja from Shah Jahan, which had earlier been given to his grandfather Raja Man Singh I by Emperor Akbar.

In 1647, Jai Singh joined in Shah Jahan's invasions of Balkh and Badakhshan in Central Asia.

In 1649, in another blow to Mughal prestige—Kandahar was recovered by Abbas II of Persia. In the ensuing Mughal-Safavid War the Mughals twice attempted to eject the Persians from Kandahar under the command of Prince Aurangzeb (in 1649 and 1652) —on both occasions Jai Singh was present as an army commander, but the attempts failed due to the lack of adequate artillery and poor marksmanship of the Mughal gunners.

A third grand attempt was made in 1653 under the command of Shah Jahan's oldest and favorite son Dara Shikoh, a rival of Aurangzeb, and again Jai Singh was sent with this army. Dara Shikoh's campaign was marred by his military incompetence, including poor military advisors, and frequent clashes with officers who had taken part in the earlier campaigns under Aurangzeb. He repeatedly taunted Jai Singh for those failures. But when his own campaign ended with the same result, the Mughals finally gave up all attempts to recover Kandahar.

Dara Shikoh continued his hostility towards Jai Singh on their return to Agra. No promotions or awards were given to the veteran general for skillfully covering the army's retreat. Instead Jaswant Singh of Marwar of the rival Rathore clan was made commander of 6000 and received the superlative title of Maharaja.

== Mughal succession war ==
In 1657, Emperor Shah Jahan became incapacitated due to a serious illness. Dara Shikoh's three younger brothers made preparations to seize the throne. Shah Shuja in Bengal and Murad Bakhsh in Gujarat crowned themselves emperors, but Aurangzeb cleverly declared his intention of merely rescuing his father for the sake of Islam. In the face of these triple dangers, Dara Shikoh now remembered Jai Singh—and the Rajput chief was made commander of 6000 and sent east along with Dara's son Sulaiman Shikoh and the Afghan general Diler Khan

They triumphed over Shah Shuja at the Battle of Bahadurpur (24 February 1658) and chased him back to Bengal (May). By that time Aurangzeb had won the Battle of Dharmat (15 April 1658) and the Battle of Samugarh (29 May 1658) and captured Agra (8 June). Jai Singh and his men were stuck far in the east while their homes and families in the west were at the mercy of Aurangzeb's troops—so Jai Singh and Diler Khan advised Sulaiman Shikoh to flee while they submitted to the new emperor. Jai Singh then advised Jaswant Singh of Marwar against helping Dara Shikoh to secure his position with Aurangzeb.

Despite his victories Aurangzeb did not have a secure footing on the Mughal throne, still needing the support of the leading Muslim and Rajput generals. So he pardoned Maharaja Jaswant Singh who had fought him at Dharmat and promoted Jai Singh as a commander of 7000, the highest possible rank for any general.

== Campaign against the Marathas ==
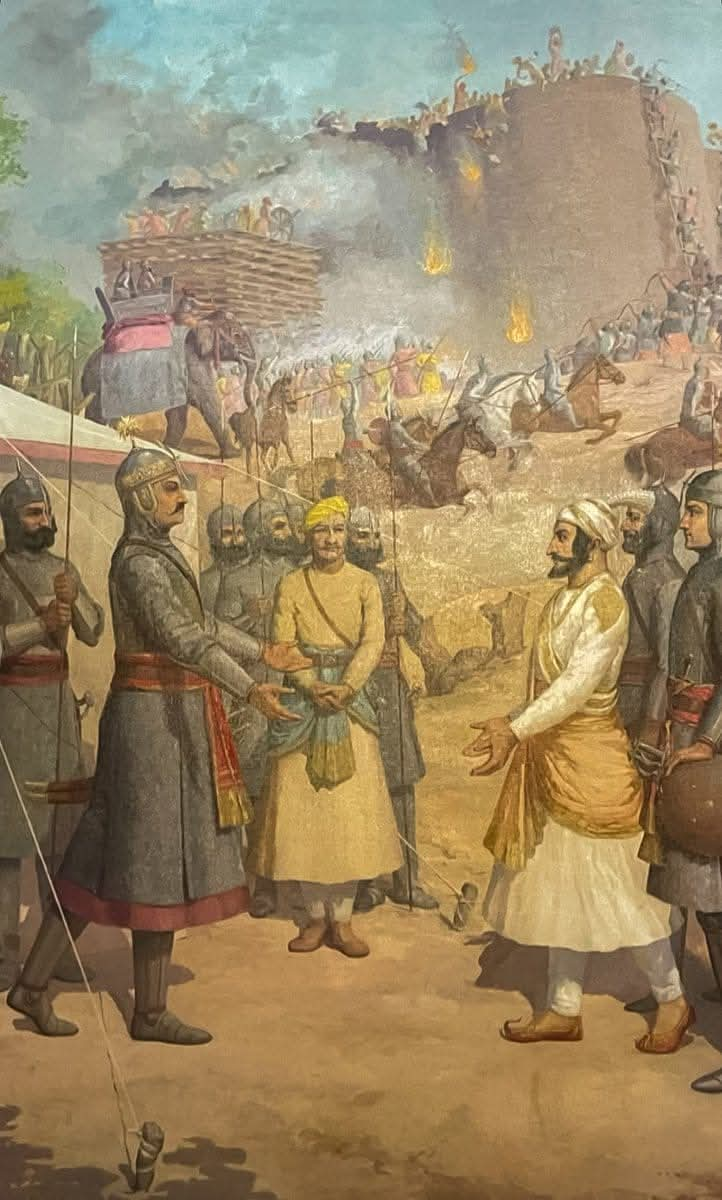
Shivaji submits to Jai Singh

The Deccan Wars between the Mughal Empire and the southern sultanates had been complicated by the rise of the Maratha king Shivaji. In 1659, Shivaji killed Afzal Khan, a notable general of Bijapur. In 1664, he sacked the wealthy port city of Surat. Raja Jai Singh, who had begun his own military career in the Deccan, was appointed to lead a 14,000 strong army against Deccan sultanates and the rising Marathas.

After winning several forts in Maharashtra from Shivaji, he besieged the Purandar Fort and forced Shivaji to sign the Treaty of Purandar in 1665. Shivaji is noted to have said when receiving Jai Singh "I have come as a guilty slave to seek forgiveness, and it is for you to pardon or kill me at your pleasure." Jai Singh convinced Shivaji to come to terms and join him in an invasion of Bijapur which would be beneficial for both the Marathas and Mughals. According to Jadunath Sarkar, Jai Singh not only spared the prisoners of war but also gave rewards to those who fought bravely. For this triumph Jai Singh, already the highest ranking general, received rich gifts in gold and silver — both his sons, Ram Singh and Kirat Singh, were raised in rank. The latter was serving under his father, while the former was acting as his agent at the Mughal court.

Shivaji himself wished to be excused from attending the court but agreed to send his son Sambhaji. To this end, he wrote letters to Aurangzeb, requesting forgiveness for his actions and security for himself along with a robe of honour. He also requested Jai Singh to support him in getting his crimes pardoned by the emperor, stating "Now you are protector and a father to me, so I beg you to fulfil the ambition of your son." On September 15, 1665, Aurangzeb granted his request and sent him a letter and a firman along with a robe of honor. Shivaji responded with a letter thanking the emperor:

Shiva, the meanest of life-devoting slaves who wears the ring of servitude in his ear and the carpet of obedience on his shoulder—like an atom ... [acknowledges] the goodnews of his eternal happiness, namely favours from the Emperor ... This sinner and evil-doer did not deserve that his offences should be forgiven or his faults covered up. But the grace and favour of the Emperor have conferred on him a new life and unimaginable honour ...

== Invasion of Bijapur ==
The invasion of Sultanate of Bijapur commenced in December 1665. Jai Singh now had an army of 40,000 to which Shivaji added 7,000 infantry and 2,000 cavalry. The Bijapuris melted away before this array and Jai Singh reached within 12 miles of Bijapur. However, the scorched earth of the defenders exhausted Jai Singh's food supplies and forced him to begin his retreat in January 1666.

== Declining influence and death ==
Aurangzeb held Jai Singh's son, Ram Singh I, responsible for Shivaji's escape, took away Ram Singh's estates, banished him from the court. Ram Singh was later pardoned and sent away to fight the Battle of Saraighat (1671) in faraway Assam. After the failed invasion of Bijapur by Jai singh he fell in to disfavour of Aurangzeb. He was replaced by Muazzam as viceroy of Deccan. He was recalled to royal court. On the way Jai Singh died in Burhanpur on 28 August 1667. The fortunes of his family sank low in the next two generations, but were revived later by Sawai Jai Singh.

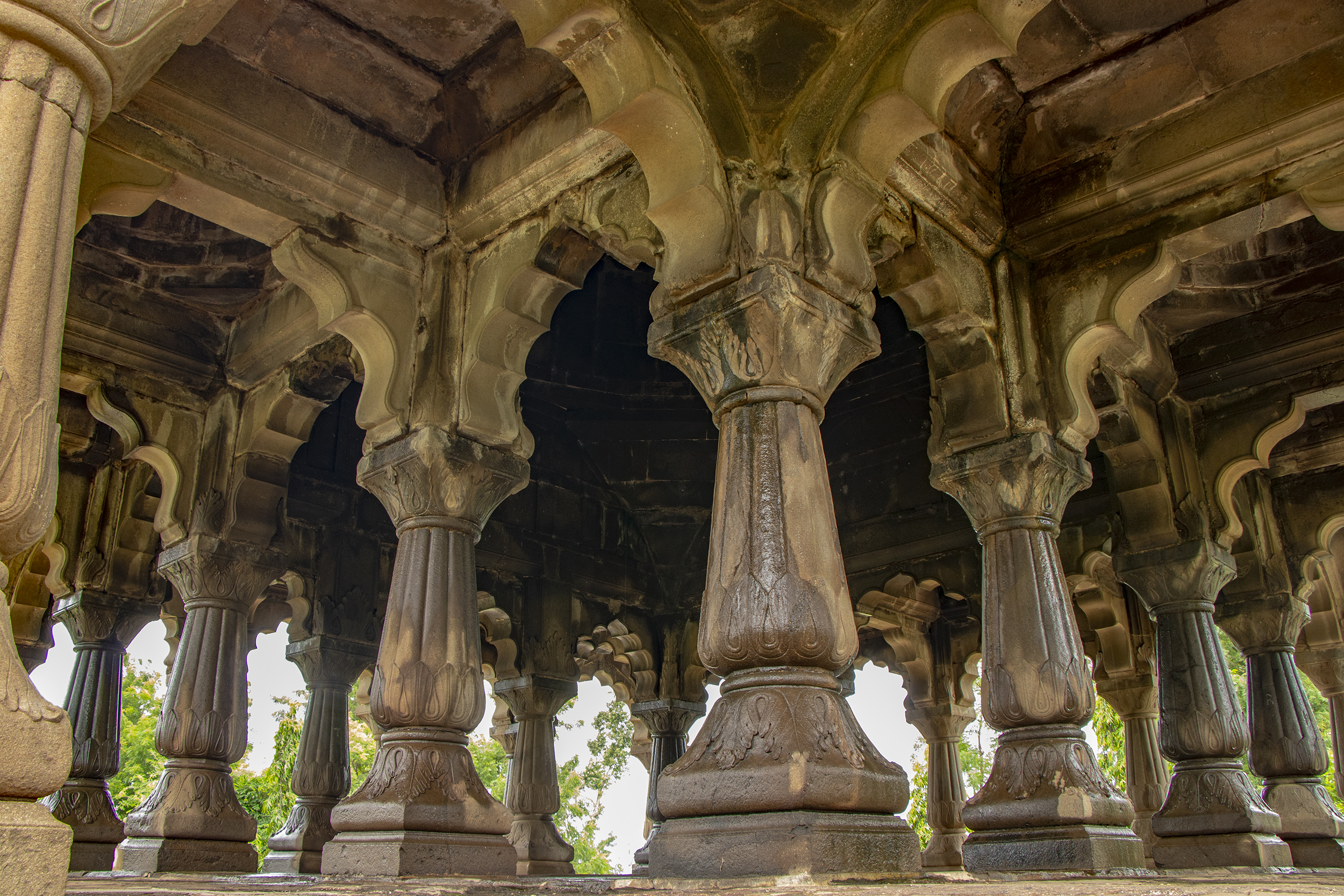
Interior of Raja Jai Singh's Chhatri built by Mughal Emperor Aurangzeb

Aurangzeb erected the Chhatri (cenotaph) at the bank of Tapti River in Burhanpur in honour of Jai Singh I, now called "Raja Ki Chhatri".

== Popular culture ==
=== Films and television ===
- In the 1952 Indian historical film Chhatrapati Shivaji, he is portrayed by Prithviraj Kapoor.
- In the 1974 Indian historical film Raja Shiv Chhatrapati , he is portrayed by Gajanan Jagirdar.
- In the 2008-2009 Indian historical TV serial Raja Shivchhatrapati, he is portrayed by Vidyadhar Joshi.
- In the 2020 Indian historical film Tanhaji, he is portrayed by Yuri Suri.
- In the 2026 Indian Marathi-language historical film Ranapati Shivray: Swari Agra, he is portrayed by Puneet Issar.

== Ancestry ==
Ancestors of Jai Singh I

8. Man Singh I, Raja of Amber
4. Jagat Singh
5. Shringar Deiji of Jaitaran (Marwar)
2. Maha Singh, Raja of Garha
1. Jai Singh I
12. Udai Singh II, Maharana of Mewar
6. Shakti Singh
13. Sujan/Suja Deiji of Toda
3. Damyanti Deiji

== See also ==
- List of Rajputs

== Notes & References ==
=== References ===
- Stewart Gordon (1993). The Marathas 1600-1818. The New Cambridge History of India. Cambridge University Press. ISBN 978-0-521-26883-7.
- Sarkar, Jadunath (1992). Shivāji and his times. Bombay: Orient Longman. ISBN 0-86125-609-3. OCLC 29616512.
- Sarkar, Jadunath; Simha, Raghubīra (1994) [1984]. A history of Jaipur: c. 1503-1938. Hyderabad: Orient Longman. ISBN 81-250-0333-9. OCLC 312542101.
- Haft Anjuman, correspondence of Mirza Raja Jai Singh compiled by his secretary Ugrasen.
- "Jaipur City (or Jainagar)". The Imperial Gazetteer of India. 1909. pp. 399–402.
- "Jaipur State". The Imperial Gazetteer of India. 1909. pp. 382–399.
- “A Mughal Icon Reconsidered,” Catherine Glynn and Ellen Smart. Artibus Asiae, Vol. LVII, 1/2, p. 5.
