= Asaf Khan =

Asaf Khan may refer to several members of the nobility of the Mughal dynasty of India:

- Asaf Khan I, or Khwaja Abdul Majid, subahdar (governor) of Allahabad during the reign of Akbar
- Abu'l-Hasan Asaf Khan (1569–1641), Grand Vizier of the Mughal emperor Shah Jahan

== See also ==
- Asif Khan (disambiguation)
