= Battle of Samugarh =

1658 battle in the Mughal war of succession

- Part of Mughal war of succession (1658–1659)
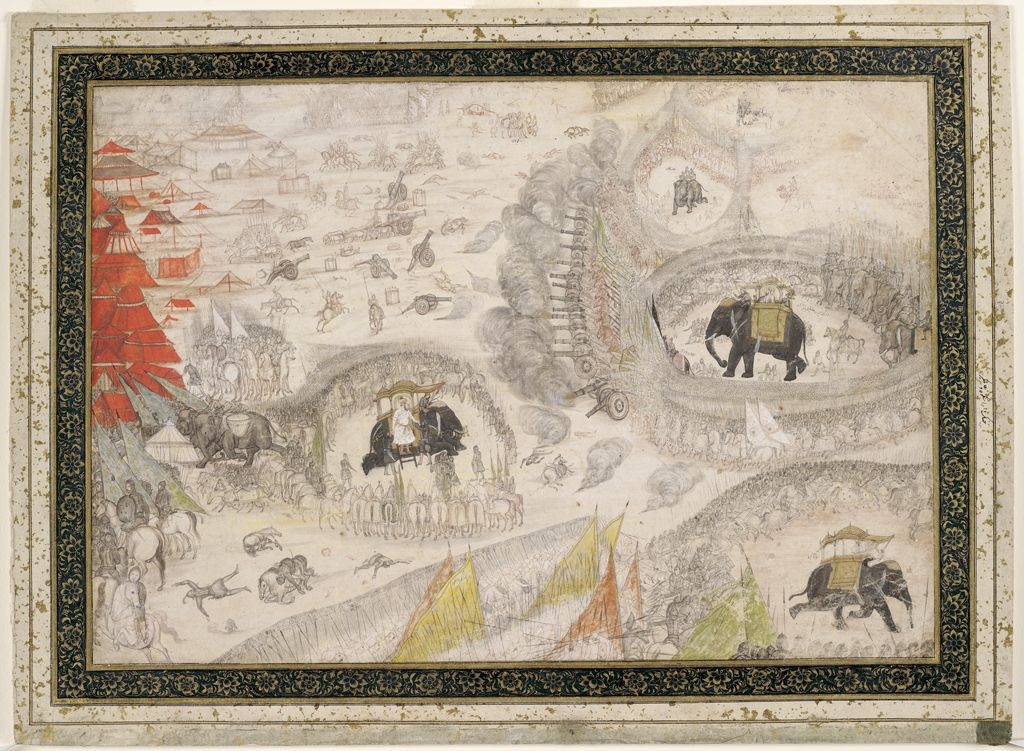
- Battle of Samugarh
| Date | 29 May 1658 |
| Location | Samugarh, Mughal Empire, about 10 miles (16 km) east of Agra |
| Result | Aurangzeb's victory: Coronation of the Aurangzeb as Mughal Emperor |

Commanders and leaders
| Aurangzeb; Murad Bakhsh (WIA); Bahadur Khan (WIA); Shaikh Mir; Zulfiqar Khan; Kilich Khan | Dara Shikoh; Sulaiman Shikoh; Rao Chhatrasal Hada †; Rustam Khan † |

Strength
| 50,000–60,000 men | 50,000–60,000 men |

Battle of Samugarh, also known as Jang-e-Samugarh (29 May 1658), was a decisive battle in the struggle for the throne during the Mughal war of succession (1657–1659) between the sons of Mughal Emperor Shah Jahan after the emperor's serious illness in September 1657. The battle of Samugarh was the second battle fought between Dara Shikoh (the eldest son and heir apparent) and two of his younger brothers, Aurangzeb and Murad Baksh (third and fourth sons of Shah Jahan) to decide who would be the heir of the throne after their father.

== Background ==
Both sides had around 50,000 to 60,000 men however Aurangzeb was a much better general and his army was more experienced. Dara depended on his Hada Rajputs and Saiyids of Barha but the major bulk of his army was hastily recruited and had no experience in war. Dara was also overconfident and did not try to get help from the nobility of his father's empire.

== Battle ==
Dara Shikoh started the battle with cannonade, which continued for one hour. Dara's cavalry under Rustam Khan then attacked Aurangzeb's artillery under Saif Shikan Khan, Rustam was soon attacked by Aurangzeb's infantry and both sides started cutting into each other. However, Dara's van continued to weaken as Rustam died fighting and his men fled after his death. In Aurangzeb's army, Bahadur Khan was seriously wounded and fell from his horse, but Aurangzeb quickly sent reinforcements under Shaikh Mir to Bahadur's aid. The Rajputs of Dara, who formed the vanguard and right wing of Dara's army were able to penetrate into Aurangzeb's van and attacked Zulfiqar and Murad. Murad was wounded in the fight and the left wing of Aurangzeb was completely routed by the Rajputs, who now attacked Aurangzeb's centre. However, Aurangzeb used his numbers to cut down the Rajputs and check their advance. Dara Shukoh, upon seeing the Rajputs fall, became indecisive and chose to dismount his elephant and retreat. According to Saqi Mustad Khan, Dara had control of his large reserves and Aurangzeb's army had grown tired. However, instead of reinforcing his van, Dara chose to escape from the battlefield, resulting in a decisive victory for Aurangzeb.

During the battle, the Mughal artillery of both armies included iron-cased rocket artillery. French traveller François Bernier was present during the battle, describing the Mughal ban iron rockets used in the battle.

== Conclusion ==
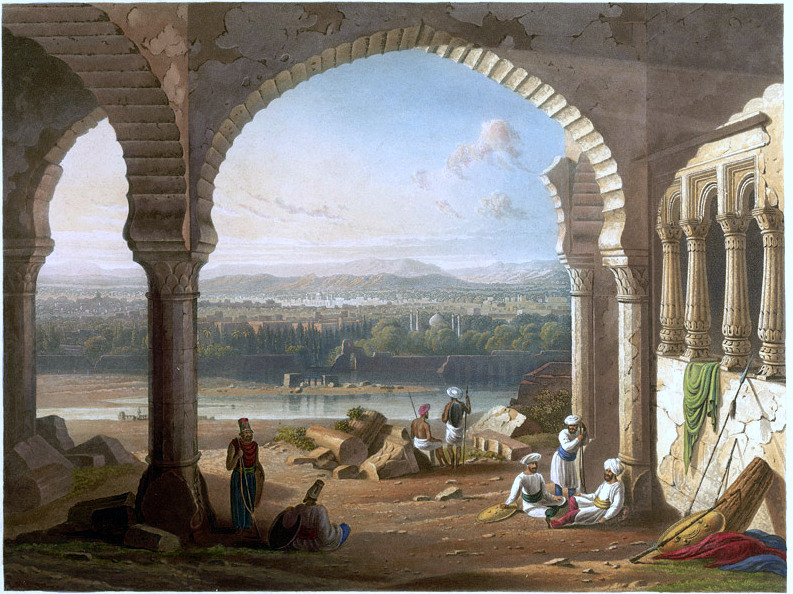
Sepoys loyal to the Mughal Emperor Aurangzeb, maintain their positions around Agra, in the year 1658. - by William Purser

Dara Shukoh fled from the battlefield and soon gathered up his household and left Shahjahanabad, which then fell to Aurangzeb.

A Sikh text records that Dara Shikoh's army fled to Goindwal where Guru Har Rai had deployed his army, the Akal Sena, to prevent and delay Aurangzeb's army from pursuing Dara Shikoh. Mughal historians do not record this. Contemporary Mughal scholars refer to Sikh assistance to Aurangzeb during the war of succession as a "rumor."

After his victory, Aurangzeb would go on to imprison his brother Murad and father Shah Jahan. Meanwhile, Dara Shukoh escaped and was captured and executed in 1659.

== See also ==
- Shah Jahan
- Mughal Empire
- Battle of Machhiwara
