= Murad Bakhsh =

Mughal prince (1624–1661)

Mirza Murad Bakhsh مرزا مراد بخش
- Shahzada of the Mughal Empire; Mirza
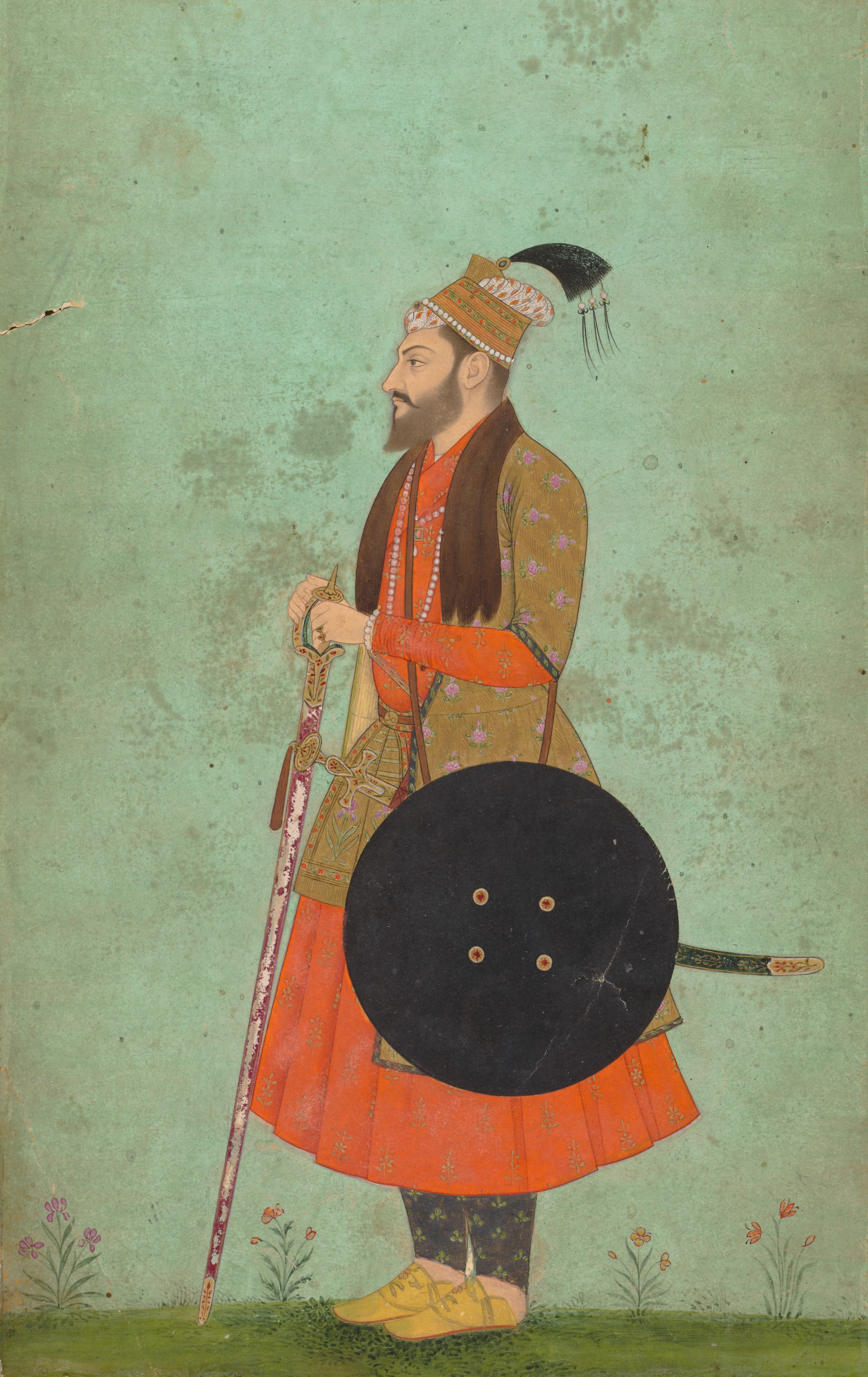
- Prince Murad Bakhsh in his 30s c. 1655

Subadar of Multan
- Reign: 1643 –14 December 1646
- Emperor: Shah Jahan I Aurangzeb
- Predecessor: Saeed Khan
- Successor: Saeed Khan

Subadar of Balkh
- Reign: 16 February 1646 – 9 August 1646)
- Emperor: Shah Jahan I
- Successor: Aurangzeb

Subadar of Kashmir
- Reign: 20 August 1647 – July 1648
- Emperor: Shah Jahan I

Subadar of Deccan
- Reign: 25 July 1648 – 14 September 1649
- Emperor: Shah Jahan I

Subadar of Kabul
- Reign: 23 January 1650 – 1654
- Emperor: Shah Jahan I
- Predecessor: Quli Khan Turani
- Successor: Said Khan

Subadar of Gujarat
- Reign: March 1654 –14 December 1661
- Emperor: Shah Jahan I Aurangzeb
- Predecessor: Shaista Khan
- Successor: Shah Nawaz Khan Safavi
- Born: 8 October 1624; Rohtasgarh Fort, Mughal Empire
- Died: 14 December 1661 (aged 37); Gwalior Fort, Mughal Empire
- Cause of death: Execution
- Burial: Traitor's Cemetery (Gwalior)
- Spouse: Sakina Banu Begum (m. 1638) Sarasvathi Bai
- Issue: Muhammad Yar Mirza; Izzat Bakhsh Mirza; Dostdar Banu Begum; Asaish Banu Begum; Hamraz Banu Begum
Names
- Mirza Muhammad Murad Bakhsh
- House: Mughal dynasty
- Dynasty: Timurid dynasty
- Father: Shah Jahan
- Mother: Mumtaz Mahal
- Religion: Sunni Islam
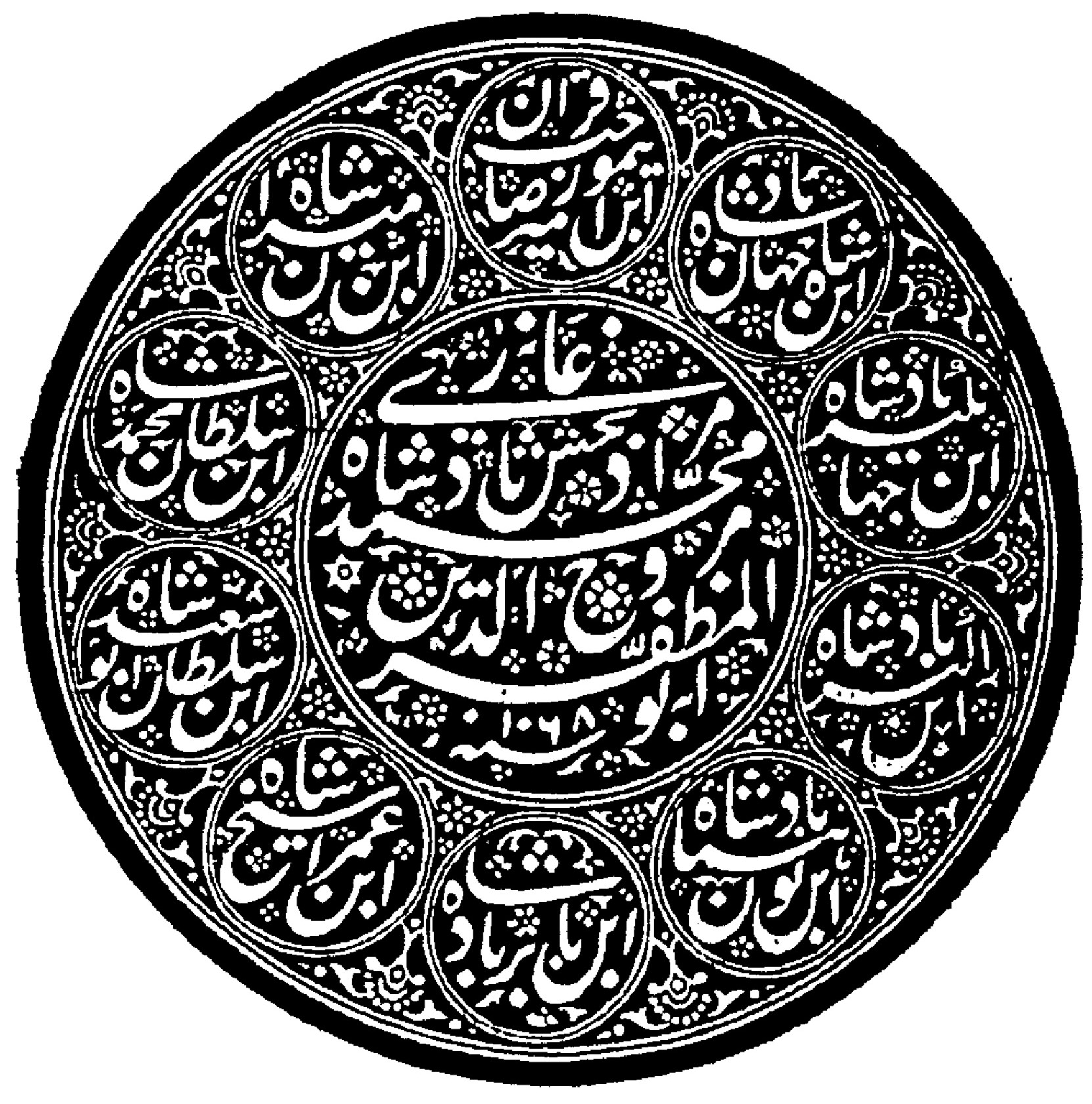
- Seal

Mirza Muhammad Murad Bakhsh (9 October 1624 – 14 December 1661) was a Mughal prince and the youngest surviving son of Mughal Emperor Shah Jahan and Empress Mumtaz Mahal. He was the Subahdar of Balkh, until he was replaced by his elder brother Aurangzeb in the year 1647.

== Family ==
Muhammad Murad Bakhsh was born on 9 October 1624, at the Rohtasgarh Fort in Bihar, as the sixth and youngest surviving son of Emperor Shah Jahan and his wife, Mumtaz Mahal. Murad's siblings included his two politically powerful sisters, the princesses Jahanara Begum and Roshanara Begum, as well as the heir-apparent to his father, his eldest brother, Crown Prince Dara Shikoh and the future Mughal Emperor Aurangzeb.

== Personal life ==
In 1638, Murad Bakhsh, at the age of fourteen years, married the Safavid princess, Sakina Banu Begum, daughter of Shah Nawaz Khan Safavi. She was the younger sister of his elder sister-in-law, Dilras Banu Begum, who was Aurangzeb's wife.

== Governorship ==
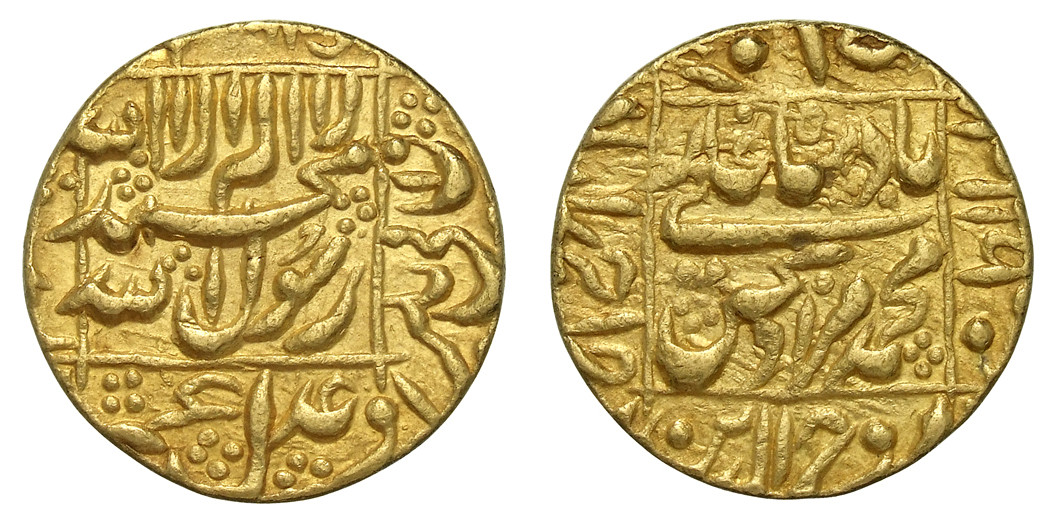
Coin of Mirza Murad Bakhsh

He was appointed as the Subadar of Multan (1642), of Balkh (16 February 1646 to 9 August 1646), of Kashmir (20 August 1647 to July 1648), of Deccan (25 July 1648 to 14 September 1649), and Kabul (23 January 1650 to 1654), of Gujarat (March 1654), and Malwa.

=== Courtiers ===
- Raja Aman Khan Bahadur – Died in 1661, Mewat
- Darar Khan – Died 1673, Mewat
- Muhammad Rustam Shaikh – Died 1648, Deccan.
- Muhammad Allahauddin Shaikh – Died 1655. He was brother of Rustam Shaikh.
- Miah Khan – Died 1653, Deccan.
- Rajkumar Hariram Singh – 1622–1678(56), The Deputy of Murad Baksh from 1646 to 1651. He was second son of Raja Gaj Singh of Nagpur and the brother of Raja Amar Singh of Nagpur
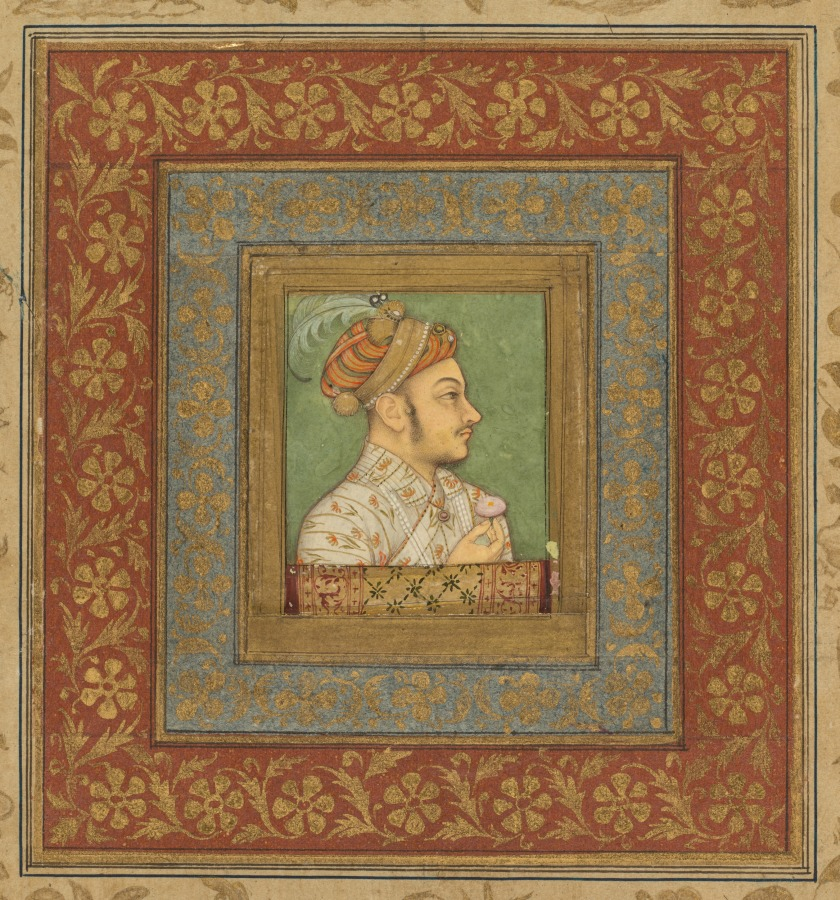
- Portrait of Mirza Murad Bakhsh by Balchand.
  Rajkumar Veer Singh – 1636–1680(44), Eldest son of Amar Singh of Nagpur.

== War of succession ==
On 30 November 1657, he proclaimed himself emperor at Ahmedabad, after reports that his father was ill. During the same year, he received the Ottoman ambassador Manzada Husain Agha, who arrived in the port of Surat and was on his way to meet Shah Jahan in Agra. Manzar Hussain Agha mentions his disappointment regarding the wars between Shah Jahan's sons.

Murad Bakhsh joined hands with Aurangzeb to defeat Dara Shikhoh, the eldest son of Shah Jahan. In fact, it was the ferocious charge led by Murad Bakhsh and his Sowars that eventually turned the outcome of the battle in favor of Aurangzeb during the Battle of Samugarh.

On 7 July 1658, while he was in a tent with his brother Aurangzeb, he was intoxicated, secretly sent to the prison and transferred to Gwalior Fort from January 1659.

He faced a trial that sentenced him to death for having murdered former Diwan clerk named Ali Naqi, in 1661. Aurangzeb then replaced Murad Bakhsh as the Subedar of Gujarat, and placed Inayat Khan as the new Mughal commander of Surat.

== Death ==
On 14 December 1661, after spending three years in prison, he was executed at Gwalior Fort. With the last of his brothers now dead, Aurangzeb was the undisputed emperor of the Mughal Empire.

== Ancestry ==
Ancestors of Murad Bakhsh

8. Jalal-ud-din Muhammad Akbar, Mughal Emperor
4. Nur-ud-din Muhammad Jahangir, Mughal Emperor
9. Mariam-uz-Zamani
2. Shahab-ud-din Muhammad Shah Jahan I, Mughal Emperor
10. Udai Singh, Raja of Marwar
5. Jagat Gosain
11. Manrang Devi of Gwalior
1. Murad Bakhsh
12. I'timad-ud-Daulah
6. Abu'l-Hasan Asaf Khan
13. Asmat Begam
3. Mumtaz Mahal
14. Ghias ud-din 'Ali Asaf Khan
7. Diwanji Begum

== See also ==
- Moradabad
- Shah Jahan
- Mughal–Safavid War (1649–1653)
