= Zeb-un-Nissa =

Mughal princess (1638–1702)

- Shahzadi of the Mughal Empire
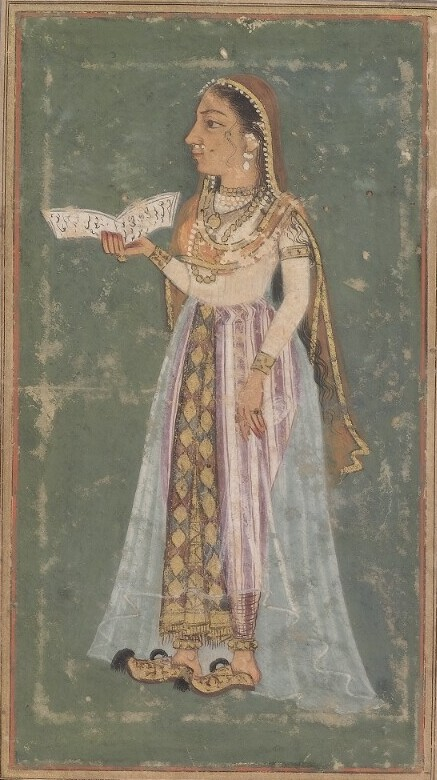
- Born: 15 February 1638; Daulatabad, Mughal Empire, present-day Aurangabad India
- Died: 26 May 1702 (aged 64); Delhi, Mughal Empire, present-day India
- Burial: Sikandra, Agra
- House: Timurid
- Father: Aurangzeb
- Mother: Dilras Banu Begum
- Religion: Sunni Islam

Zeb-un-Nissa (Persian: زیب النساء) (15 February 1638 – 26 May 1702) was a Mughal princess and the eldest child of Emperor Aurangzeb and his chief consort, Dilras Banu Begum. She was also a poet, who wrote under the pseudonym of Makhfi (مخفی, "Hidden, Disguised, Concealed One").

Imprisoned by her father in the last 20 years of her life at Salimgarh Fort, Delhi, Princess Zeb-un-Nissa is remembered as a poet, and her writings were collected posthumously as Diwan-i-Makhfi (Persian: ديوانِ مخفى) - "Complete (Poetical) Works of Makhfi".

== Early years ==
=== Birth ===
Zeb-un-Nissa ("Ornament/ Beauty of Womankind"), the eldest child of Prince Muhi-ud-Din (later, Emperor Aurangzeb), was born on 15 February 1638 in Daulatabad, Deccan, exactly nine months after the marriage of her parents. Her mother, Dilras Banu Begum, was Aurangzeb's first wife and chief consort, and was a princess of the prominent Safavid dynasty, the ruling dynasty of Iran (Persia). Zeb-un-Nissa was her father's favourite daughter, and it was because of this that she could compel him to pardon people who had offended him.

=== Education and accomplishments ===
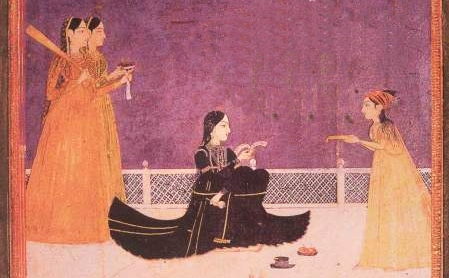
Princess Zeb-un-Nissa with her attendants.

Aurangzeb charged Hafiza Mariam, one of the women of the court, with the education of Zeb-un-Nissa. She seems to have inherited her father's keenness of intellect and literary tastes, because Zeb-un-Nissa memorized the Quran in three years and became a Hafiza at the age of seven. This occasion was celebrated by her father with a great feast and the declaration of a public holiday. The princess was also given a reward of 30,000 gold pieces by her delighted father. Aurangzeb paid the princely sum of 30,000 gold pieces to the ustani (an honorific title for a female "ustad" or well-regarded teacher) for having taught his cherished daughter well.

Zeb-un-Nissa then learned the sciences of the time with Ashraf Mazandarani, who was also a great Persian poet. She learned philosophy, mathematics, astronomy, literature, and was a mistress of Persian, Arabic and Urdu. She had a good reputation in calligraphy as well. Her library surpassed all other private collections, and she employed many scholars on liberal salaries to produce literary works at her bidding or to copy manuscripts for her. Her library also provided literary works on each subject, such as law, literature, history and theology.

Zeb-un-Nissa was known for helping people in need. For example, she supported widows and orphans and sent Hajj pilgrims to Mecca and Medina every year, bearing all their expenses for the pilgrimage. She also took an interest in music and was well known among the women of her time for also being a singer.

== Aurangzeb's accession ==
When Aurangzeb became the emperor after Shah Jahan, Zeb-un-Nissa was 21 years old. Aurangzeb learnt of the talent and capacity of his daughter and began to discuss the political affairs of his Empire with her, listening to her opinions. It has been mentioned in some books that Aurangzeb sent all the royal princes for the reception of Zeb-un-Nissa each time she entered the court. Zeb-un-Nissa had four younger sisters: Zeenat-un-Nissa, Zubdat-un-Nissa, Badr-un-Nissa and Mihr-un-Nissa.

Regarding her looks, "... she is described as being tall and slim, her face round and fair in colour, with two moles, or beauty-spots, on her left cheek. Her eyes and abundant hair were very black, and she had thin lips and small teeth. In Lahore Museum is a contemporary portrait, which corresponds to this description... In dress she was simple and austere; in later life she always wore white, and her only ornament was a string of pearls round her neck." Also with the way she dressed comes about her making an invention. "Zeb-un-Nissa invented a woman garment known as Angya Kurti. This was a modified form of the dress of the women of Turkestan. The modification was done to suit Indian conditions".

Zeb-un-Nissa lived in a period when many "great" poets were at the peak of their reputation; e.g. Mawlana Abdul Qader Bedil, Kalim Kashani, Saa'eb Tabrizi and Ghani Kashmiri. There is a noticeable influence of Hafez Sherazi's style on the poetry of Zeb-un-Nissa. However, she is considered as one of the poets of the Indian School of Poetry in Persian. "Zebunnisa was trained in the serious study of religious doctrine and in matters in faith, and she was known as an excellent scholar in several academic areas and as a literary figure and patron of some renown. She sang well and composed songs and planted many of the gardens of her day."

Zeb-un-Nissa selected "Makhfi" (which means "Hidden One" in Persian) as her pen-name in her poetry. In addition to her poetic book or collection of poems, called Diwan, which contains approximately 5,000 verses, she also wrote the following books: Monis 'ul-Roh, Zeb 'ul-Monsha’at (زیب‌ المنشآت / زيب المنشئات, "Literary Compositions of Zeb") and Zeb 'ul-Tafāsir (زيب التفاسير, "Quranic Tafsirs of Zeb"), She employed a prominent scholar of Mughal court, Mulla Safi-ud-din Ardabili to translate a massive Arabic Tafasir into Persian, and Mulla, out of gratitude, named the work as Zeb-ul-Tafasir. In Makhzan 'ul-Ghaib (مخزن الغيب, "Store (or Treasure) of the Unseen"), the author writes that the poetic book of Zeb-un-Nissa contained 15,000 verses. Zeb-un-Nissa encouraged compilations and translations of various works also.

=== Later years, imprisonment and death ===
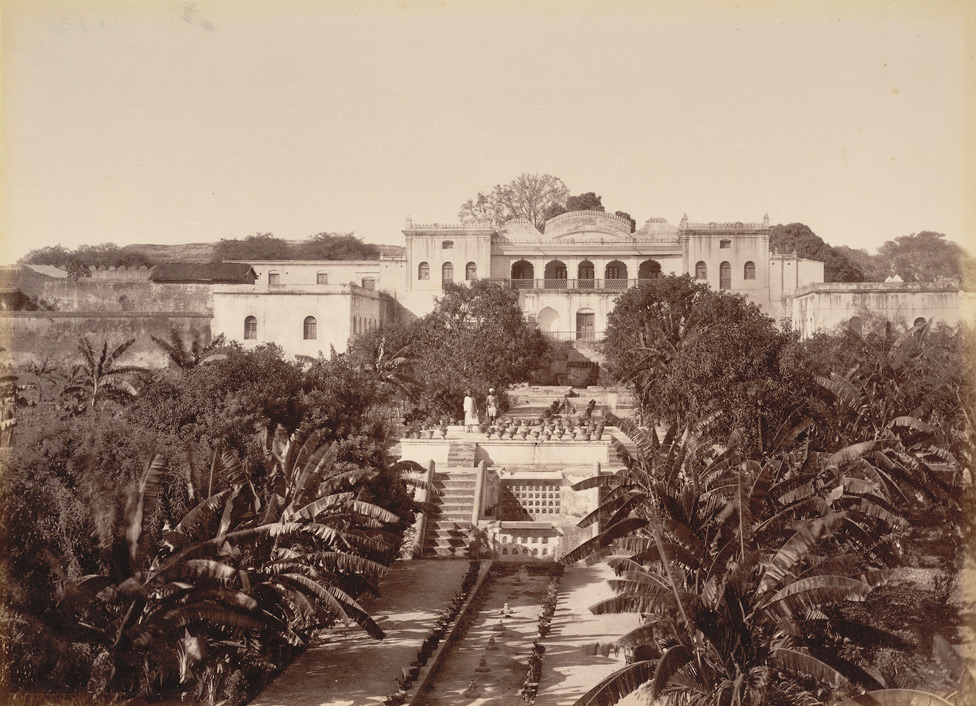
Zeb-un-Nissa's palace, 1880, Aurangabad.

There are multiple conflicting accounts offering explanations for the circumstances which ultimately led to her imprisonment at Salimgarh Fort, Delhi, at the edge of Shahjahanabad (present Old Delhi). In 1662, when Aurangzeb was taken ill and his physicians prescribed a change in the environment, he took his family and court with him to Lahore. At that time Akil Khan Razi, the son of his Vizier, was Governor of that city. In the following period, Akil Khan and Zeb-un-Nissa allegedly had a brief yet failed affair, after which Aurangzeb began to distrust her and later imprisoned her. Other theories suggest that she was imprisoned for being a poet and a musician (both anathema to Aurangzeb's austere, more orthodox and fundamental way of life and thinking). Yet another explanation points to her correspondence with her younger brother, Muhammad Akbar. She supported the young prince in the inevitable ongoing conflict of succession, and was discovered to have written to him during the rebellion in 1681 AD (over the course of which, he had publicly accused Aurangzeb of transgressions against Islamic law). Her punishment was to have her accumulated wealth confiscated, her annual pension of 4 lakhs nullified, and that she was to be held prisoner at Salimgarh until her death.

It was here, after 20 years of imprisonment, that Zeb-un-Nissa died after seven days of illness, still captive in Shahjahanabad while Aurangzeb was on a trip to the Deccan. Conflicting sources state the date of her death alternately as 1701 AD and 1702 AD. Her tomb was in the garden of "Thirty thousand trees" (Tees Hazari), outside of the Kashmiri Darwaza, the north gate of the city. But when the railway line was laid out by the British at Delhi, her tomb with its inscribed tombstone was shifted to Akbar's mausoleum at Sikandra, Agra. There is also a tomb in Nawankot, Lahore, Pakistan, but its authenticity is doubtful. Haroon Khalid infers that the apocryphal association of Zeb-un-Nissa with the tomb in Lahore came about after the defeat of rebel prince Dara Shikoh in the Mughal war of succession (1657–1661), with the supporters of Shikoh (who had spent time in Lahore) transferring their aspirations to the rebellious princess by connecting her with the tomb even though she remained buried in Delhi and later at Agra.

In 1724, years after her death, her scattered and extant writings were collected under the name Diwan-i-Makhfi, literally, the Book of the Hidden One. Although Diwan-i-Makhfi was traditionally attributed to Zeb-un-Nissa, the word “Makhfi” is a pen name shared by other poets of the same era, and the attribution of the collection remains inconclusive.It contained four hundred and twenty-one ghazals and several ruba'is. Subsequently, in 1730 other ghazals were added to the manuscript, which was also illuminated.

== Personal life ==
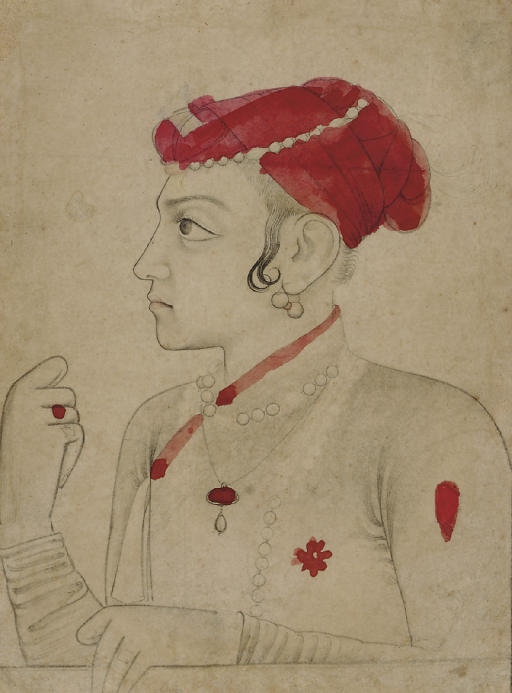
Zeb-un-Nissa was betrothed to her first-cousin, Prince Sulaiman Shikoh.

Zeb-un-Nissa did not get married and remained single her whole life, despite the fact that she had many suitors. This also came with the rise of speculative gossip about secret lovers and palace trysts.

Zeb al-Nissa had four younger sisters: Zeenat un-Nissa, Zubdat-un-Nissa, Badr-un-Nissa and Mihr-un-Nissa.

Her grandfather, Emperor Shah Jahan, had betrothed her to her first cousin, Prince Sulaiman Shikoh, the eldest son of her paternal uncle, Crown Prince, Dara Shikoh. Shah Jahan had intended for her to become a future Mughal empress as Sulaiman was the heir to Dara Shikoh, who was next in line for succession to the Mughal throne after Shah Jahan. The marriage would have been a perfect match but did not, however, take place, due to Aurangzeb's reluctance; who despised his older brother. The King of Iran, Shah Abbas II's son Mirza Farukh also wanted to marry her. Many other proposals also came to her, but she demanded that before the fixation of marriage, she would see the princes.

Zeb-un-Nissa spent all her life on literary works and poetry, as she herself said:

Oh Makhfi, it is the path of love and alone you must go.
No one suits your friendship even if God be though.

According to certain sources, "dehumanizing" scandals (created and/or written by some foreigners) regarding the lives of Mughal ladies were not uncommon (during the post-Renaissance era). For example, a claim of: "A sordid episode of [Zeb-un-Nissa's] carnal romance with Aqil Khan Razi and his death inside a hot cauldron with burning fire under it, gained wider currency and was eagerly picked up by the... populace." However, other sources state that Razi lived long (as a government official) and died naturally.

== Legacy ==
Her poetic book was printed in Delhi in 1929 and in Tehran in 2001. Its manuscripts are in the National Library of Paris, the library of the British Museum, the University of Tübingen library in Germany and in the Mota library in India. The garden which she laid out in Lahore itself and which was called the Chauburji, or four-towered, can still be traced by portions of the walls and gates remaining.

== Sample translation ==
Her Ghazal tells the story of love:

You with the dark curly hair and the breathtaking eyes,
your inquiring glance that leaves me undone.

Eyes that pierce and then withdraw like a blood-stained sword,
eyes with dagger lashes!
Zealots, you are mistaken – this is heaven.

Never mind those making promises of the afterlife:
join us now, righteous friends, in this intoxication.

Never mind the path to the Kaabah: sanctity resides in the heart.
Squander your life, suffer! God is right here.

Oh excruciating face! Continual light!
This is where I am thrilled, here, right here.

There is no book anywhere on the matter.
Only as soon as I see you do I understand.

If you wish to offer your beauty to God, give Zebunnisa
a taste. Awaiting the tiniest morsel, she is right here.

Translated by Sally Lee Stewart, Elena Bell and Maksuda Joraeva.

The governor of Lahore, Aqel Khan, was smitten with Makhfi. So he sent her this poem:

I'll be your nightingale if I should see you in the garden

With others there I'll be your fluttering moth, if I should see you;

Showing yourself to be the shining light of an assembly—

Well, that's no good to me; it's in your shift I want to see you.

Makhfi sent back this answer:

The nightingale forsakes the rose to see me in the garden,

The pious Brahmin will forsake his idols when he sees me—

I'm hidden in my words, like scent within a rose's petal,

Whoever wants to see me, it's in my words he'll see me.

In another exchange, Aqel Khan took a risk by being a bit risqué:

What feeds on nothing and will rise, And, standing, vomits, and then dies?

Makhfi sent an insult as her reply:

Women provoke this thing to stir... Your mother's sure to know—ask her.

Translated by Dick Davis

== Works ==
- Princess Zeb-un-nissa (1920). Divan-i Makhf (Persian). Lahore Amrit Press.
- Zeb-un-nissa; Tr. by Paul Whalley (1913). The Tears of Zebunnisa: Being Excerpts from 'The Divan-I Makhf'. W. Thacker & Co.

== Popular culture ==
=== Films and television ===
- In the 2026 Indian Marathi-language historical film Ranapati Shivray: Swari Agra, she is portrayed by Amisha Thakur.

== Bibliography ==
- Chandrababu, B. S.; Thilagavathi, L. (2009). Woman, Her History and Her Struggle for Emancipation. Bharathi Puthakalayam. p. 209. ISBN 978-8189909970.
- Chopra, R. M., "Eminent Poetesses of Persian", 2010, Iran Society, Kolkata.
- Krieger-Krynicki, Annie (2005). Captive Princess: Zebunissa, Daughter of Emperor Aurangzeb. Oxford University Press. ISBN 978-0-19-579837-1.
- Lal, Magan; Westbrook, Jessie Duncan (1913). The Diwan of Zeb-un-Nissa . London: John Murray – via Wikisource.
- Nath, Renuka (1990). Notable Mughal and Hindu women in the 16th and 17th centuries A.D. (1. publ. in India. ed.). New Delhi: Inter-India Publ. ISBN 9788121002417.
