= Badr-un-Nissa Begum =

Mughal princess (1647–1670)

- Shahzadi of Mughal Empire
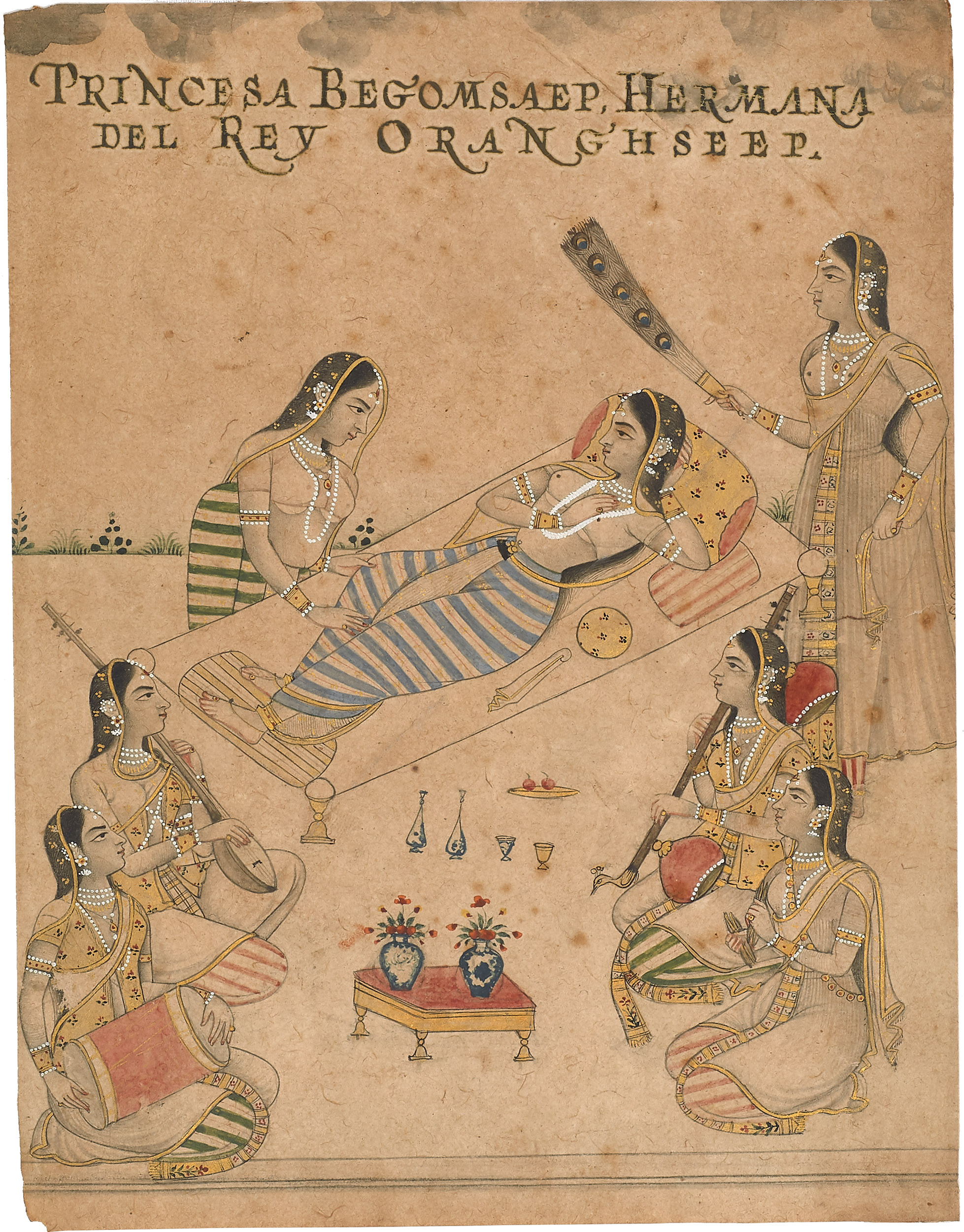
- Badr alongside her sisters
- Born: 17 November 1647; Delhi, Mughal Empire
- Died: 9 April 1670 (aged 22); Delhi, Mughal Empire
Names
- Badr-un-nissa Begum
- House: Timurid
- Father: Aurangzeb
- Mother: Nawab Bai
- Religion: Sunni Islam

Badr-un-Nissa Begum (Persian: بدرالنساء بیگم; 17 November 1647 – 9 April 1670) was a Mughal princess, the only daughter of Mughal Emperor Aurangzeb, and his secondary wife Nawab Bai.

Badr-un-Nissa is an Arabic phrase meaning "the Full Moon among Women".

== Life ==
Badr-un-Nissa Begum was born on 17 November 1647, during her grandfather Emperor Shah Jahan's reign. Her mother was Nawab Bai, a princess from Kashmir Belonging from the Jarral Rajput dynasty of Jammu and Kashmir. She was the couple's third and last child. Her elder siblings were Prince Muhammad Sultan, and Prince Muhammad Muazzam (future Emperor Bahadur Shah I). At the time of Aurangzeb's second coronation in 1659, he rewarded Badr-un-Nissa with 160,000 Rupess.

She is said to be more educated than her sisters. She memorized the Quran, and read books on faith at her father's persuasion. She spent her life doing good deeds. Aurangzeb loved her for her marvelous character, etiquette, and kindheartedness. She died unmarried at twenty-two on 9 April 1670, in the thirteenth year of her father's reign. Aurangzeb was distressed upon her death.

== Ancestry ==
Ancestors of Badr-un-Nissa Begum

8. Nur-ud-din Muhammad Jahangir, Mughal Emperor
4. Shahab-ud-din Muhammad Shah Jahan I, Mughal Emperor
9. Jagat Gosain
2. Muhi-ud-din Muhammad Aurangzeb, Mughal Emperor
10. Abu'l-Hasan Asaf Khan
5. Mumtaz Mahal
11. Diwanji Begum
1. Badr-un-Nissa Begum
12. Sarmast Khan, Raja of Rajauri
6. Taj-ud-din Khan, Raja of Rajauri
3. Nawab Bai Begum
