= Daulatabadi Mahal =

Wife of Mughal emperor Aurangzeb

- Born: Daulatabad, Mughal Empire
- Died: 17th century, Delhi, Mughal Empire
- Spouse: Aurangzeb
- House: Timurid (by marriage)

Daulatabadi Mahal was a consort of Mughal emperor Aurangzeb.

== Life ==
Her title indicates that she hailed from Daulatabad. Daulatabad was the main capital of the Mughal Empire in the Deccan, until Aurangzeb had shifted the headquarters to Aurangabad. She married Aurangzeb and entered the imperial harem. However, little is known about her life or influence in the harem. Aurangzeb opposed his consorts interfering in political affairs, but their influence in politics could not be suppressed.

In the August of 1675, the daughter of Daulatabadi Mahal's brother, married Prince Muhammad Sultan, Aurangzeb and Nawab Bai's eldest son. Shortly after the marriage of Daulatabadi's niece to Muhammad Sultan, the prince's mansab and pension were restored; and he was placed in recognition as heir.

Daulatabadi Mahal most likely died before her husband, much like his other consorts.
