= Aurangabadi Mahal =

Second wife of Aurangzeb (died 1688)

- Born: 1637
- Died: 1688 (aged 50–51); Bijapur, Mughal Empire
- Burial: Aurangabadi Mahal Mausoleum, Bijapur
- Consort: Aurangzeb
- Issue: Mihr-un-Nissa Begum
- Religion: Islam

Aurangabadi Mahal (Persian: اورنگ آبادی محل; died 1688) was a consort of the Mughal emperor Aurangzeb.

== Origins ==
Aurangabadi Mahal either belonged to Aurangabad, or had entered Aurangzeb's harem in the city of Aurangabad. She was either Georgian or Circassian by origin (see Black Sea slave trade). Ever since the reign of Emperor Akbar, it had been ordained that the names of the women of the imperial harem should not be mentioned in public, they should be designated by some epithet, derived either from the place of their birth or the city or country where they had entered the imperial harem.

== As Consort ==
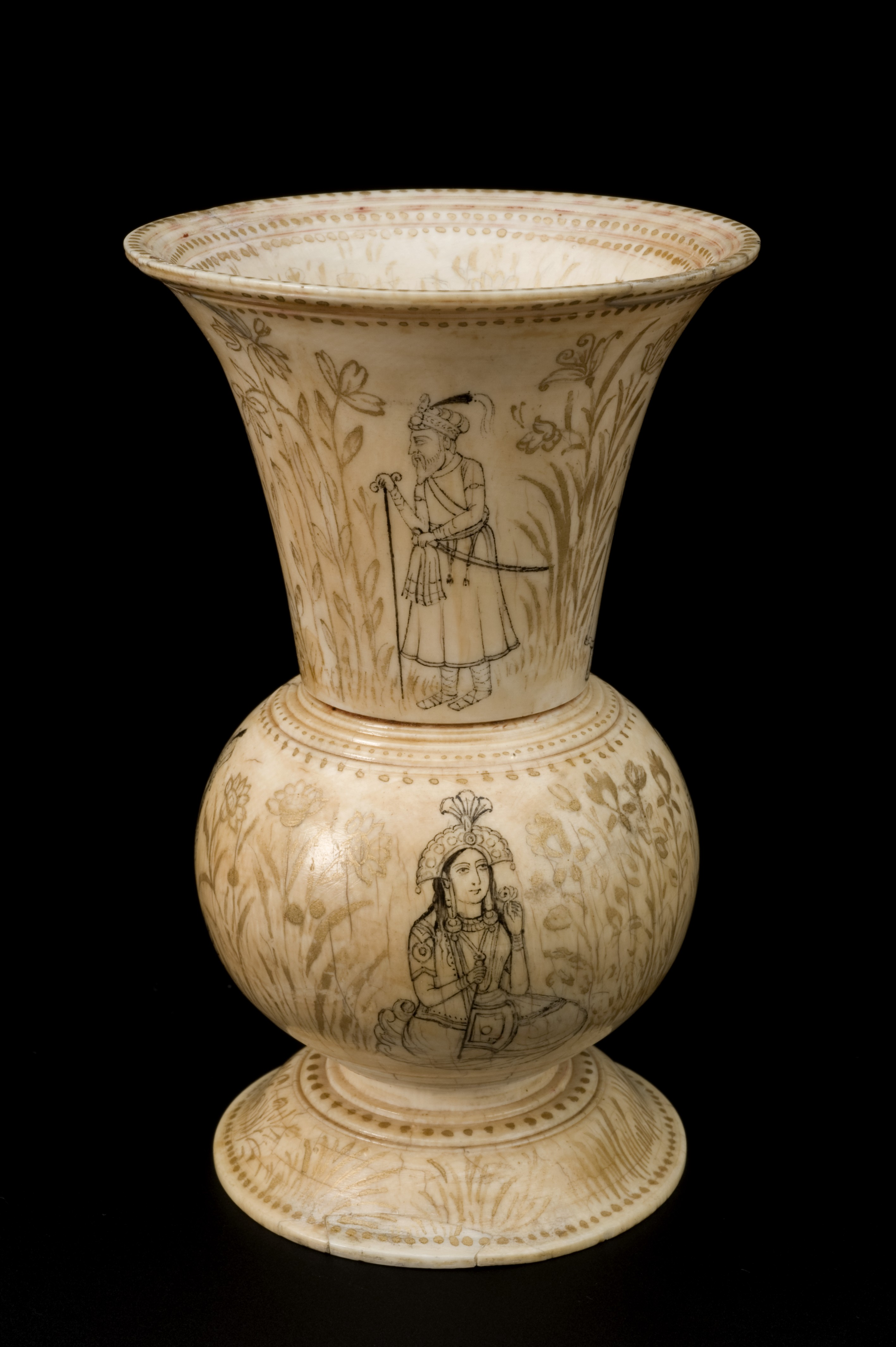
Depiction of Aurangzeb and one of his consorts.

On 28 September 1661, she gave birth to Aurangzeb's youngest daughter, Mihr-un-nissa Begum. She was the ninth child of her father, and the only child of her mother. She commissioned a mosque known as Main Sahibs's Mosque in Dhobi Katra, Khari Baoli.

In March 1680, Yalangtosh Khan Bahadur was sent to bring Aurangabadi, and Princess Zeb-un-nissa Begum from Delhi to Ajmer. Both of them reached there in May, and were welcomed by Prince Muhammad Azam Shah Mirza, who conducted them to the imperial harem. However, in February 1681, when Prince Muhammad Akbar Mirza had initiated a rebellion against his father, Aurangzeb, Aurangabadi was sent back to Delhi. She was accompanied by Salima Banu Begum, wife of Prince Muhammad Akbar Mirza and daughter of Prince Sulaiman Shikoh Mirza.

In March 1686, before Aurangzeb's march to capture the fort of Bijapur, Khan Jahan Bahadur was sent to Burhanpur to bring Aurangabadi. An emerald smarani was made over to him for her. She reached Aurangzeb's camp at Sholapur from Delhi in May 1686, and was welcomed at the door of the fort near the deorhi by Prince Muhammad Kam Bakhsh Mirza. She followed Aurangzeb to Bijapur, and remained there after its conquest in September 1686.

== Death ==
In November 1688, Aurangabadi was still living in Bijapur, when plague spread out in the city. The plague was the cause of death of a number of people, and one of its victims was Aurangabadi Mahal. After her death, Saqi Must'ad Khan, the author of the Ma'asir-i-Alamgiri described her as 'the Emperor's parastar, the old and devoted hand-maid.'

When Zeb-un-nissa Begum heard of her illness, she was deeply grieved, for she had always been nice to everybody. Her death removed the last rival of Aurangzeb's youngest and most beloved concubine, Udaipuri Mahal, the mother of Prince Kam Bakhsh.

== Bibliography ==
- Sarkar, Jadunath (1947). Maasir-i-Alamgiri: A History of Emperor Aurangzib-Alamgir (reign 1658-1707 AD) of Saqi Mustad Khan. Royal Asiatic Society of Bengal, Calcutta.
