= Nawab Bai =

Secondary wife Of Aurangzeb, daughter of Raja Tajuddin Khan

Rahmat-un-Nissa
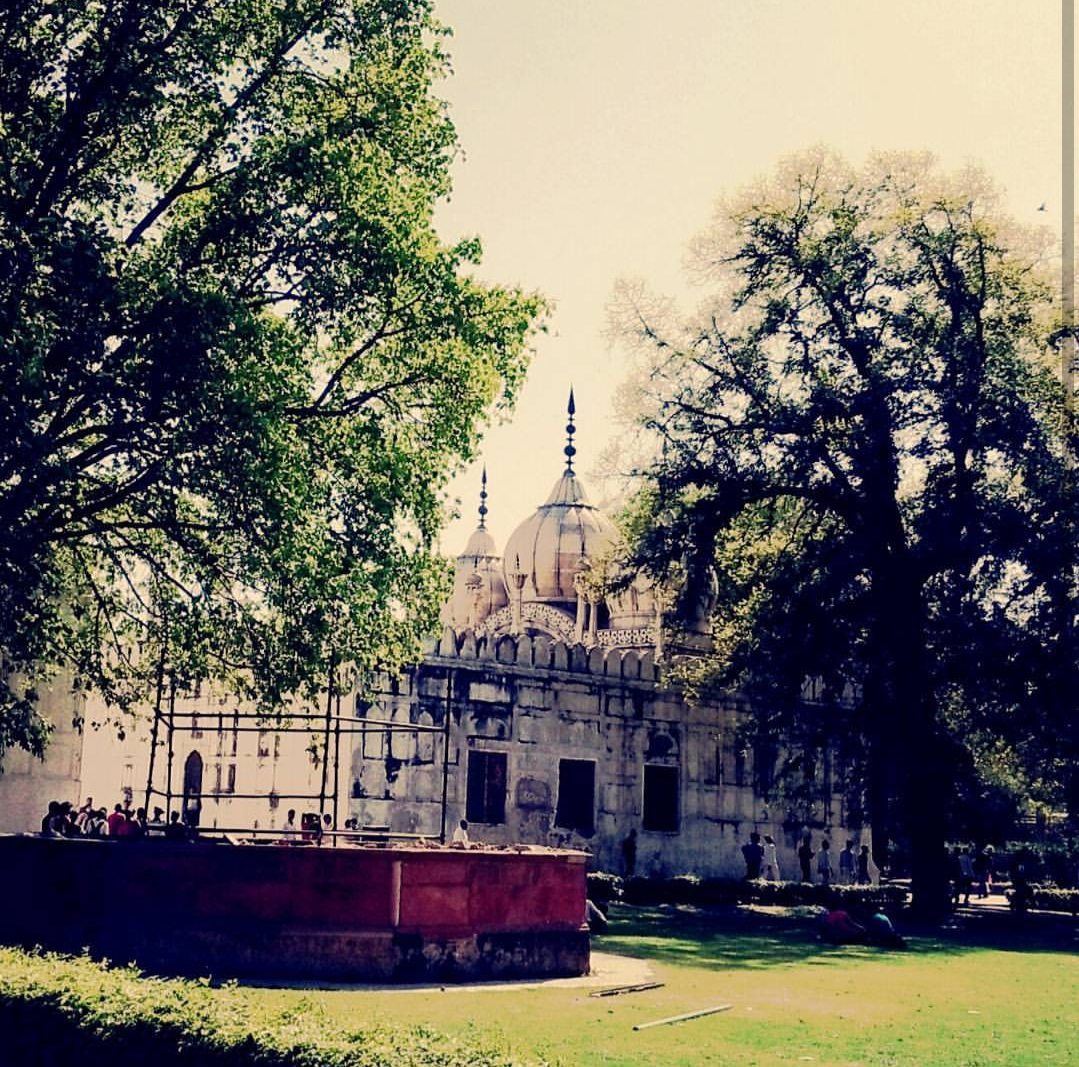
- Died: 1691; Delhi, Mughal Empire
- Burial: Moti Masjid
- Spouse: Aurangzeb (m. 1638)
- Issue: Muhammad Sultan; Bahadur Shah I; Badr-un-Nissa Begum
Names
- Rahmat-un-Nissa
- House: Jarral
- Father: Raja Tajuddin Khan
- Religion: Islam

Rahmat-un-Nissa (Persian: رحمت النساء بیگم; died c. 1691), better known by her title Nawab Bai (Persian: نواب بائی; meaning "The Great"), was a secondary wife of the Mughal emperor Aurangzeb. She gave birth to Aurangzeb's first two sons, including Bahadur Shah I, who became Mughal emperor in 1707.

== Family and lineage ==
There are two conflicting accounts of Nawab Bai's parentage. According to one account, she was the daughter of Raja Tajuddin Khan who was the Jarral ruler of the Rajauri State in Kashmir, and belonged to the Jarral clan.

According to another account by the Mughal historian Khafi Khan, she was the daughter of a Muslim saint named Syed Shah Mir, a descendant of Abdul-Qadir Gilani, who had taken to a life of retirement among the hills of Rajauri. The Raja of Rajauri, Raja Bahadur Khan, who became close to this holy man, offered him his daughter in marriage. Syed Shah Mir accepted and they became parents to a son and a daughter. Then the saint went on a pilgrimage to Mecca, where all trace of him was lost. When Shah Jahan later demanded from the Raja a tribute of money, and a daughter of his house, the Raja sent him this granddaughter, Nawab Bai, who was noted for her beauty, goodness and intelligence. According to modern historians, she was given this false pedigree in order to give Bahadur Shah a right to call himself a Sayyid.

== Marriage ==
In the imperial Mughal harem, she was taught languages and culture by a set of masters, governesses, and Persian women versed in court manners, and in 1638 she was married to Aurangzeb becoming his secondary wife. After her marriage, she was given the name Rahmat-un-Nissa.

A year later, she gave birth to Aurangzeb's first son, Prince Muhammad Sultan Mirza. He was born on 29 December 1639, at Mathura. Over the next eight years, she gave birth to two more children. They were Prince Muhammad Muazzam Mirza (future Emperor Bahadur Shah I), and the memorizer of the Quran, Princess Badr-un-Nissa Begum.

Although she had given birth to Aurangzeb's first son, still his first wife, the Persian princess, Dilras Banu Begum, remained his chief consort as well as his favourite.

=== Aurangzeb's reign ===
The misconduct of her sons, Muhammad Sultan and Muhammad Muazzam, disrupted her latter life. In the war of succession in 1659, her eldest son Muhammad Sultan joined his uncle, Shah Shuja, and married his daughter Gulrukh Banu Begum. However, he soon left Shah Shuja, and returned to his father in February 1660. On Aurangzeb's orders he was put under arrest and was sent to Salimgarh fort, and was later transferred to Gwalior fort in 1661.

In 1662, during Aurangzeb's illness, his sister Roshanara Begum, took charge of him and would not allow anyone except her own confidants, to see him. Believing that there was no hope of her brother's surviving, Roshanara took charge of the state. When Nawab Bai learned of this and complained, Roshanara became angry, seized her by the hair and dragged her out of Aurangzeb's chamber.

In 1669, a man named Abdullah submitted a petition to Nawab Bai, that after the dismissal of his son, the post of faujdar of Arandole be granted to him. But when the matter was submitted to Aurangzeb, it was rejected.

In 1670, Muhammad Muazzam had been instigated by the flatterers to act in a self-willed and independent manner. When Aurangzeb's letter of advice produced no effect, he summoned Nawab Bai from Delhi, in order to send her to her son to rectify his behaviour. She reached Sikandra in April 1670, where Muhammad Akbar, Bakshimulk Asad Khan and Bahramand Khan conducted her to the imperial harem. In May 1670, she started for Aurangabad, and was commanded to spend two days at Gwalior, with her son Muhammad Sultan. After staying there for some time, Sarbuland Khan escorted her to Muhammad Muazzam.

In 1686, she met the famous Italian writer and traveller, Niccolao Manucci at Goa, who claimed that have bleed Nawab Bai twice a year.

In 1687, Muhammad Muazzam was suspected of contumacy with Sultan Abul Hasan, the ruler of Golkonda. Her advice and even personal entreaty had no effect on him, and at last on Aurangzeb's orders he was placed under arrest. Muazzam's sons, and his first wife and chief consort Nur-un-Nissa Begum were also imprisoned in separate jails.

Nawab Bai is known to have built a serai at Fardapur, at the foot of the pass, and also founded Baijipura, a suburb of Aurangabad.

== Death ==
She died in Delhi before the middle of 1691, after long years of separation from her husband and children. Aurangzeb along with his daughter Zinat-un-Nissa came to Muhammad Muazzam in order to condole him.

== Bibliography ==
- Sarkar, Jadunath (1947). Maasir-i-Alamgiri: A History of Emperor Aurangzib-Alamgir (reign 1658–1707 AD) of Saqi Mustad Khan. Royal Asiatic Society of Bengal, Calcutta.
- Manucci, Niccolao (1907). Storia Do Mogor: Or, Mogul India, 1653–1708 – Volume 2. J. Murray.
- Sarkar, Jadunath (1912). History of Aurangzib mainly based on Persian sources: Volume 1 – Reign of Shah Jahan. M.C. Sarkar & sons, Calcutta.
- Irvine, William (2006). The Later Mughals. Low Price Publications. ISBN 8175364068.
- Maliknama; Legacy Of the Maliks by Mughal Court | Open Library
- Biography Of Nawab Bai by Mughal Court | Open Library
