= Government Medical College, Rajouri =

Medical College in Jammu & Kashmir

- Motto: Researching and Educating to Save Lives.
- Type: Medical college and hospital
- Established: 2019; 7 years ago
- Affiliations: National Medical Commission
- Academic affiliations: University of Jammu
- Principal: Dr. Amarjeet Singh Bhatia
- Director: Dr. Mushtaq Ahmad Rather
- Location: Main campus: Mehra Rajouri Hospital campus: Kheora Rajouri, Rajouri, Jammu and Kashmir, India; 33.37184°N 74.34472°E
- Campus: 53 acres (21 ha); Urban
- Website: gmcrajouri.jk.gov.in

Government Medical College, Rajouri (GMC-R) is a full-fledged tertiary referral Government Medical College in the Rajouri district of Jammu and Kashmir, India. It was established in 2019. The college and hospital have been approved and recognized by the National Medical Commission (erstwhile Medical Council of India) since the year of inception of the college.

== About college ==
The college imparts the degree Bachelor of Medicine and Surgery (MBBS). Nursing and para-medical courses are also offered. The college is affiliated with the University of Jammu and is recognised by the National Medical Commission erstwhile Medical Council of India. Selection to the college is done on the basis of merit through the National Eligibility cum Entrance Test. As of 2026, Yearly undergraduate student intake is 150 seats, raised from 100 seats.

== Courses ==
Government Medical College Rajouri offers postgraduate and undergraduate medical programs including:

- Diplomate of National Board
- MD/MS
- Bachelor of Medicine Bachelor of Surgery
- Bachelor of Science in Nursing
- Allied Sciences
- Paramedical

== List of principals ==
1. Prof. (Dr.) Zahid Hussain Gillani (04-07-2018 to 25-04-2019)
2. Prof. (Dr.) Kuldeep Singh (26-04-2019 to 30-04-2021)
3. Prof. (Dr.) Brij Mohan Gupta (01-05-2021 to 31-12-2021)
4. Prof. (Dr.) Ghulam Ali Shah (01-01-2022 to 30-04-2022)
5. Prof. (Dr.) Shashi Sudhan Sharma (01-05-2022 to 22-10-2022)
6. Prof. (Dr.) Amarjeet Singh Bhatia (23-10-2022 to present)

== See also ==
- Government Medical Colleges in Jammu and Kashmir
