= Muhammad Sultan (Mughal prince) =

Mughal prince (1639–1676)

Mirza Muhammad Sultan میرزا محمد سلطان
- Shahzada of the Mughal Empire; Mirza
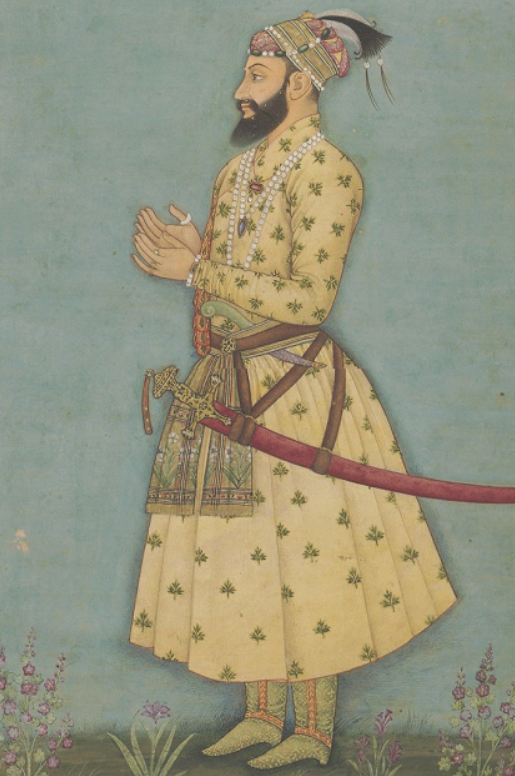
- Prince Muhammad Sultan making a dua c. 1674
- Born: 30 December 1639; Mathura, India
- Died: 14 December 1676 (aged 36); Salimgarh Fort, Delhi
- Burial: Qutb Shah, Delhi
- Spouse: Padishah Bibi (m. 1656); Gulrukh Banu Begum (m. 1659; d. 1661); Dostdar Banu Begum (m. 1672; d. 1676); Bai Phup Devi (m. 1676); One other wife
- Issue: Shahzada Masud Bakhsh
Names
- Muhammad Sultan Mirza
- House: Mughal dynasty
- Dynasty: Timurid dynasty
- Father: Aurangzeb
- Mother: Nawab Bai
- Religion: Sunni Islam

Mirza Muhammad Sultan (Persian: میرزا محمد سلطان) (30 December 1639 – 14 December 1676) was the eldest son of Mughal emperor Aurangzeb and his second wife Nawab Bai. His younger brother Muazzam later became Emperor as Bahadur Shah I in 1707.

== Life ==
In April 1656, Muhammad Sultan was appointed Heir Apparent by his father-in-law Abdullah Qutb Shah, Sultan of Golconda and Hyderabad.

When the succession war of the Mughal Empire began in 1657, he joined his father-in-law Shah Shuja, and was appointed Chief-in-Commander and Principal Counsellor in 1659.

He rejoined his father on 20 February 1660, and was imprisoned at Salimgarh Fort in Delhi, 8 May 1660. On the orders of his father Emperor Aurangzeb, he was transferred to Gwalior Fort and imprisoned there from January 1661 to December 1672.

He died on 14 December 1676, in confinement at Salimgarh Fort in Delhi.

== Marriages ==
In 1656, during the siege of Golconda negotiations for peace were carried out between Aurangzeb and Abdullah Qutb Shah. For this reason Hayat Bakhshi Begum, the Queen mother of Golconda, visited Aurangzeb and personally entreat him to spare her son. Aurangzeb agreed to restore the kingdom on the payment of one crore of rupees as indemnity and arrears of tribute and the marriage of his daughter with his son. Abdullah objected that the amount was too large, and there was delay in making the final settlement. On 10 April Aurangzeb withdrew from Golconda on the orders of Shah Jahan. On 13 April 1656, Muhammad married, by proxy, the second daughter of Abdullah Qutb Shah, named Padishah Bibi. On 20 April, she was brought away from the fort to her husband's camp.

When Aurangzeb was still a prince, he and Prince Shah Shuja, in jealousy, had vowed to unite against their elder brother Prince Dara Shikoh on their father's death. The vow had been strengthened by each entertaining the other for a week at Agra and betrothing young Muhammad to Shuja's daughter Gulrukh Banu Begum. Their fathers' quarrel had broken off the match when the pair came of age. Shuja sent secret messages to Muhammad, offering him the throne and the hand of his daughter. On the night of 18 June 1659, Muhammad slipped out of Dogachi with five servants, some gold coins and jewels, and went over to Shuja's camp, and married Gulrukh Banu Begum. In 1660, she fled to Arakan with her father, and died in 1661.

On 26 December 1672, Aurangzeb ordered Darab Khan to bring Muhammad Sultan into his sleeping chamber. He had audience, and after interview, Muhammad Sultan married Dostdar Banu Begum, daughter of Prince Murad Bakhsh. He was presented with a robe, a sword, a jewelled muttaka, and a horse with a jewelled saddle. In the khwabgah, Aurangzeb put a pearl chaplet on the prince's head and took him to the mosque. The Qazi-ul-Quzat Abdul Wahab, with Mulla Muhammad Yaqub as his agent, and Mir Sayyid Muhammad Qanauji and Mulla Auz Wajih as witnesses, tied the knot. Two lakh rupees settled as the marriage portion. Shuja'et Khan, Shaikh Nizam, Dirbar Khan, Bakhtawar Khan, and Khidmatgar Khan were present. Dostdar Banu Begum died at Rustam Khan's palace on 4 March 1676.

On 12 January 1675, Shaikh Nizam married Muhammad Sultan to Bai Phup Devi, daughter of the Raja of Kishtwar. She was the mother of Prince Masa'ud Bakhsh Mirza born on 15 August 1676, and died on 18 June 1677. On 10 September 1676, he married the daughter of the brother of Daulatabadi Mahal.

== Ancestry ==
Ancestors of Muhammad Sultan (Mughal prince)

8. Nur-ud-din Muhammad Jahangir, Mughal Emperor
4. Shahab-ud-din Muhammad Shah Jahan I, Mughal Emperor
9. Jagat Gosain
2. Muhi-ud-din Muhammad Aurangzeb, Mughal Emperor
10. Abu'l-Hasan Asaf Khan
5. Mumtaz Mahal
11. Diwanji Begum
1. Muhammad Sultan
12. Sarmast Khan, Raja of Rajauri
6. Taj-ud-din Khan, Raja of Rajauri
3. Nawab Bai Begum

== Bibliography ==
- Sarkar, Jadunath (1947). Maasir-i-Alamgiri: A History of Emperor Aurangzib-Alamgir (reign 1658-1707 AD) of Saqi Mustad Khan. Royal Asiatic Society of Bengal, Calcutta.
