= Rajouri Airport =

Airport in Rajouri, India

Rajouri Airport राजौरी विमानपत्तन راجوری ہوائی اڈ .ہ
- IATA: RJI; ICAO: none

Summary
- Serves: Rajouri
- Location: Rajouri, Jammu and Kashmir 185131, India
- Coordinates: 33°22′40″N 74°18′54″E

Map

Rajouri Airport (IATA: RJI) is the airport serving the city of Rajouri, Jammu and Kashmir, India. It is located 2 kilometres (1.2 mi) north of Rajouri in Jammu and Kashmir in India. The airport has no flights as of now.

== Airlines and destinations ==
There are currently no airlines serving Rajouri.
