= Government Degree College, Rajouri =

Government Degree College in India

Coordinates: 33.3923°N 74.3206°E

- Type: Degree College
- Established: 1981
- Academic affiliations: University of Jammu
- Location: Rajouri, Jammu and Kashmir, India
- Campus: Rural
- Website: https://www.gpgcollegerajouri.ac.in/

Government Degree College, Rajouri, established in 1981, is a co-educational general degree college in Rajouri, Jammu and Kashmir, India. This college serves the people of Rajouri and its adjoining areas. This college offers courses in arts, science, and commerce. It is affiliated to University of Jammu.

== Departments and courses ==
The college offers different undergraduate courses and aims at imparting education to the undergraduates of lower- and middle-class people of Rajouri and its adjoining areas.

=== Science ===
Science faculty consists of the departments of Physics, Chemistry, Mathematics, Botany, Zoology, Geography, Geology, Environmental Science, Computer Application (BCA), and Biotechnology.

=== Arts and Commerce ===
Arts and Commerce faculty consists of departments of Arabic, English, Persian, Urdu, Sanskrit, Hindi, History, Political Science, Philosophy, Education, Sociology, Economics, and Commerce.

== Accreditation ==
The college is recognized by the University Grants Commission (UGC). This college was accredited by the National Assessment and Accreditation Council (NAAC), and awarded B grade.
