= Mihr-un-Nissa Begum =

Mughal princess (1661–1706)

- Shahzadi of Mughal Empire
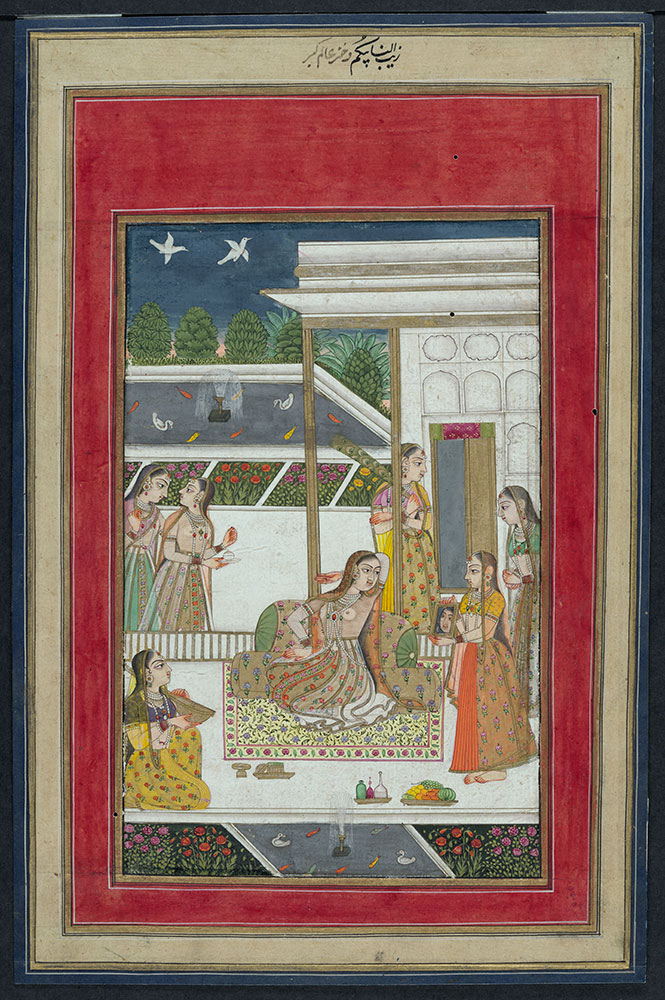
- Mihr-un-Nissa and her sisters
- Born: 28 September 1661; Aurangabad
- Died: 2 April 1706 (aged 44); Delhi
- Spouse: Izzad Bakhsh Mirza (m. 1672)
- Issue: Dawar Bakhsh Mirza; Dadar Bakhsh Mirza
- House: Timurid
- Father: Aurangzeb
- Mother: Aurangabadi Mahal
- Religion: Sunni Islam

Mihr-un-Nissa Begum (Persian: مهرالنسا بیگم; Mihr an-Nisāʾ Bigam; 28 September 1661 – 2 April 1706), meaning "Sun among women", was a Mughal princess, the fifth daughter of Mughal Emperor Aurangzeb and his consort Aurangabadi Mahal.

== Birth ==
Mihr-un-Nissa Begum was born on 28 September 1661. Her mother was a concubine named Aurangabadi Mahal. She was the ninth child and fifth daughter born to her father, and the only child of her mother.

== Marriage ==
Mihr-un-Nissa Begum married her first cousin, Izzad Bakhsh Mirza, the son of her paternal uncle Prince Murad Bakhsh Mirza, the youngest son of Emperor Shah Jahan. The marriage took place on 27th November 1672, after Izzad Bakhsh's release from the Gwalior fort. The marriage was performed in the presence of Qazi Abdul Wahhab, Shaikh Nizam, Bakhtawar Khan an Darbar Khan. She was the mother of two sons, Princes Dawar Bakhsh Mirza and Dadar Bakhsh Mirza.

== Death ==
Mihr-un-Nissa Begum died on 2 April 1706, a year before her father's death. Her husband also died along with her.
