= Salimgarh Fort =

Building in India

- Part of Delhi
- New Delhi, India
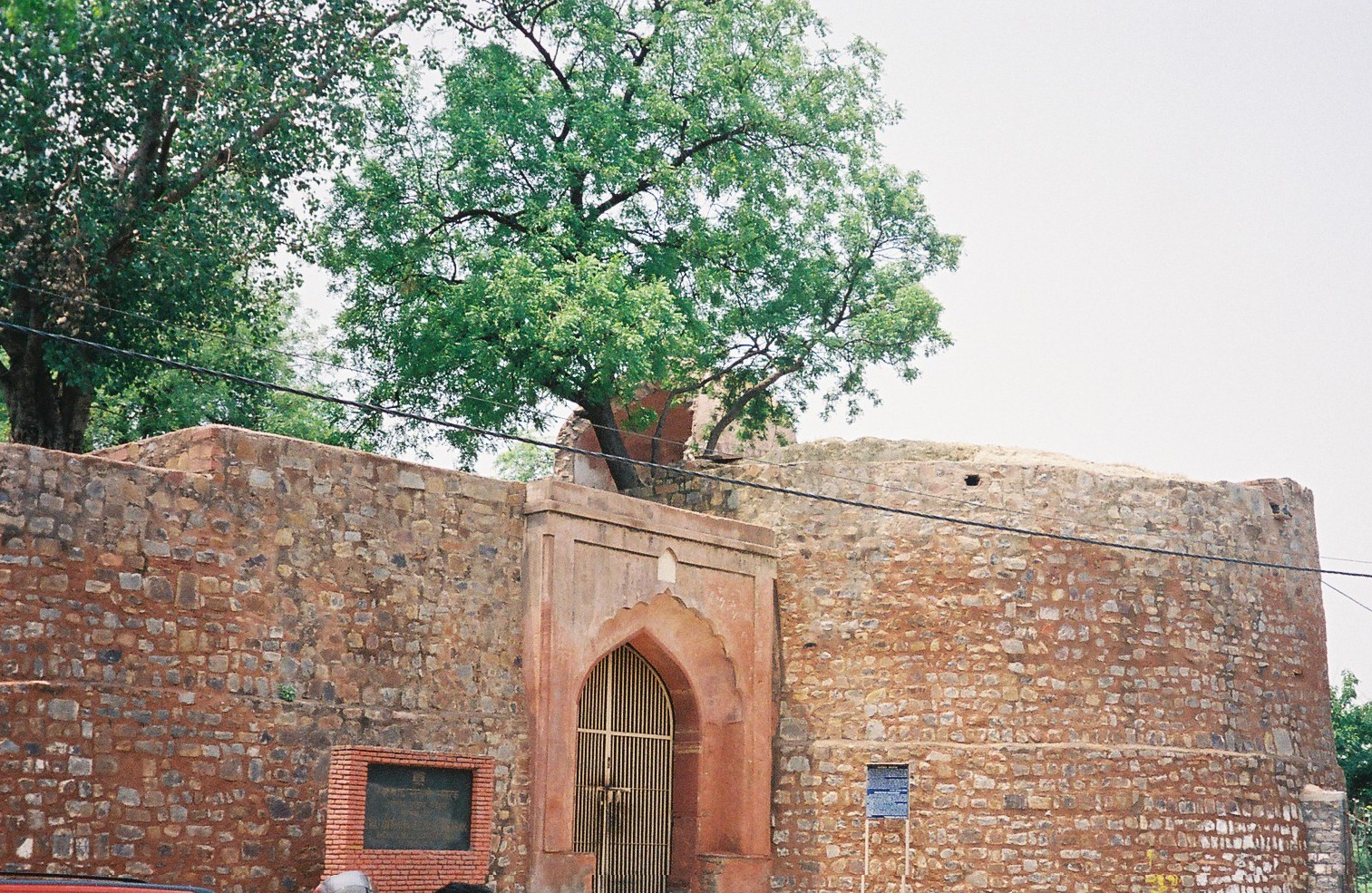
- Entrance Gate to Salimgarh Fort

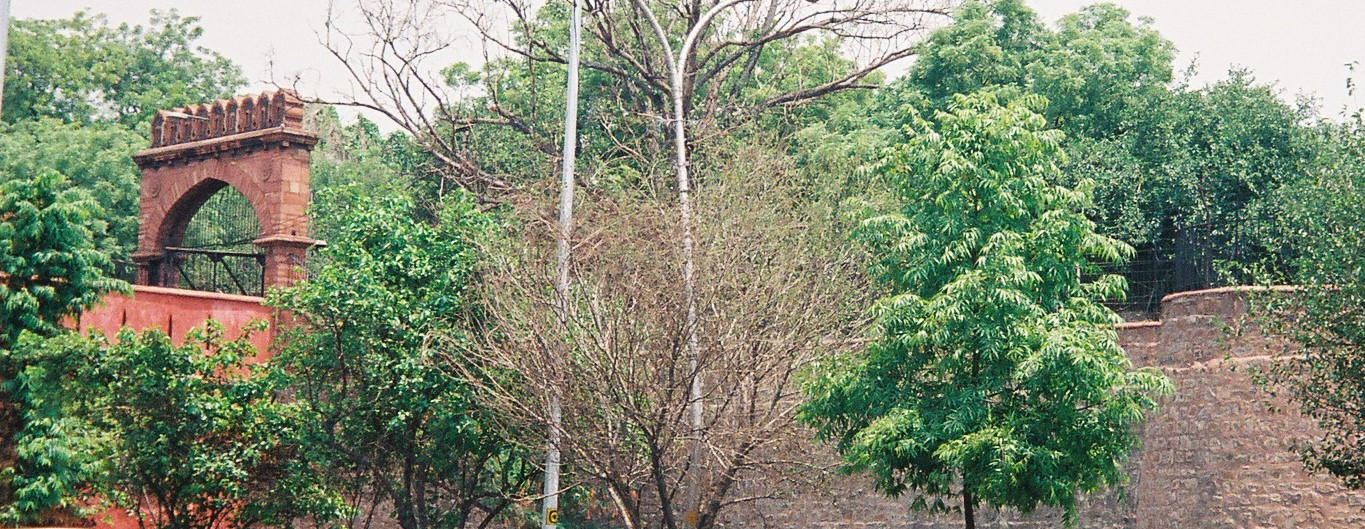
- View of Bahadur Shah Gate at head of Arched bridge linking Salimgarh Fort and Red Fort

Site information
- Type: Fort and Prison
- Owner: Government of India
- Controlled by: Sur Empire (1546–1555); Mughal Empire (1555–1857); United Kingdom: Indian Empire (1857–1947); India (1947–)
- Open to the public: Yes
- Condition: UNESCO World Heritage Site in Red Fort Complex

Location
- Location within India
- Coordinates: 28.661°N 77.240°E

Site history
- Built: 1546 AD
- Built by: Islam Shah Suri of the Sur dynasty
- Materials: Stones and Bricks
- Battles/wars: Sur Empire siege of Delhi & British War against the Indian Rebellion of 1857

Garrison information
- Occupants: Museum as Swatantrata Senani Smarak

Salimgarh Fort (also known as Salim's Fort) was built in 1546 CE in Old Delhi, on what was then an island of the Yamuna River, by Salim Shah Suri, the son of Sher Shah Suri. The fort was constructed during a period when the Mughal Empire had been temporarily overthrown; in 1540 CE, Sher Shah Suri had defeated the Mughal emperor Humayun and established the rule of the Sur Empire rule in Delhi. The Surid dynasty continued until 1555 CE, when Humayun regained control by defeating Sikandar Suri, the last ruler of the dynasty.

During the Mughal period, particularly in later years, Salimgarh Fort continued to be of strategic significance. While constructing the Red Fort and the city of Shahjahanbad, several Mughal rulers, including Emperor Shah Jahan—who completed Shahjahanabad in 1639 CE—are believed to have camped at the fort. It is also said that Humayun camped there for three days before launching his successful campaign to recapture Delhi.

The Mughal emperor Aurangzeb later converted the fort into a prison, a practice that was continued by the British after they took control of the fort in 1857. Salimgarh Fort is now part of the Red Fort Complex. The complex was declared a UNESCO World Heritage Site in 2007, obligating the Archaeological Survey of India (ASI) to undertake well-planned conservation measures for its preservation.

== History ==
The location chosen for building the fortification was in the Delhi plains, with an elevation ranging between 80–110 feet (24–34 m), bordered by the Yamuna River on one side and the northern spur of the Aravalli range on the other. This topography—with exposed rock formations at the fort site, proximity to the northeast-trending ridge, and alignment with the jama masjid (congregational mosque)—was seen as ideal for protection against erosion by the Yamuna. Moreover, the combination of a river on one side and a mountain ridge on the other provided a natural defensive barrier, compelling any invading force to follow the river course. Considering these strategic advantages, Salimgarh Fort was constructed in 1546.

After regaining his empire, Humayun renamed Salimgarh Fort as Nurghar, since Sher Shah Suri—the founder of the Sur Empire and father of Salim Shah Suri, who built the fort—had earlier ousted Humayun from his kingdom in 1540 CE. As a result, Humayun decreed that the fort's original name should not be used in his court.

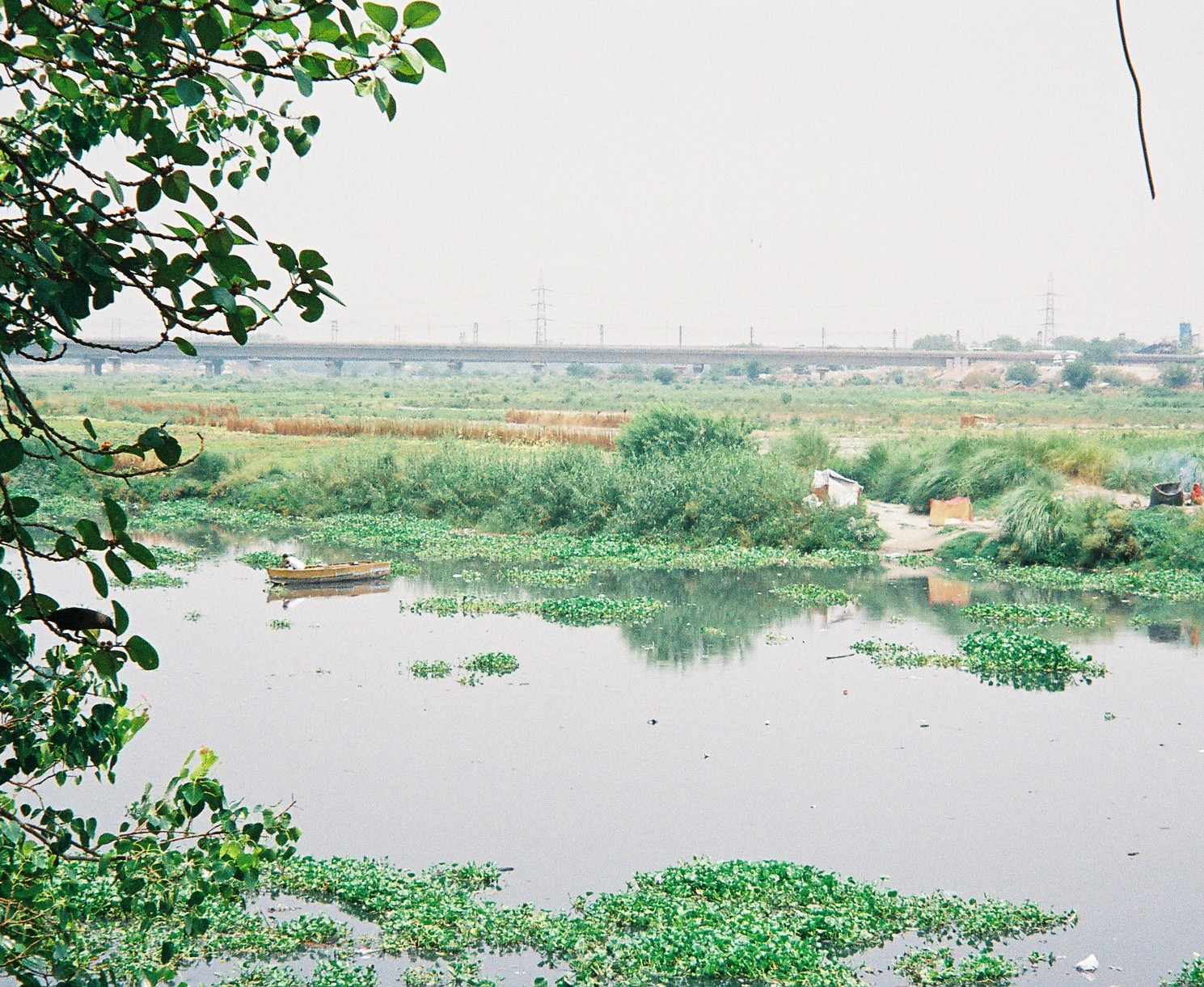
View of the Yamuna River from Salimgarh Fort, with the railway bridge in the background

During British rule, the Indian Rebellion of 1857, which was eventually suppressed by 1858, led to significant activity at the fort. The last Mughal emperor, Bahadur Shah Zafar II, was taken prisoner at Humayun's Tomb. During the rebellion, Salimgarh Fort became a centre of wartime operations. From the British perspective, Bahadur Shah Zafar's "complicity with the mutinous soldiers was obvious." He is said to have operated from this fort and convened meetings in August and early September 1857 to discuss war strategy. He reportedly observed artillery fire against the British Indian Army from the fort's ramparts.

On one occasion, when approached by army officers requesting their salaries, he made a symbolic gesture by offering to pawn his crown jewels and even sacrifice his life for the cause. The officers declined his offer, trusting the Emperor's sincerity. Subsequently, proclamations were issued declaring that the Emperor would lead an assault against the British and urging people of all castes and creeds to join the resistance.

By mid-September 1857, however, British troops were advancing on the fort. At that point, Bahadur Shah's trusted aide, Bakht Khan, advised him to retreat and prepare for guerrilla warfare in the open countryside. The Emperor, however, refused to flee. While he permitted his forces to evacuate, he himself relocated to Humayun's Tomb. The British Fourth Infantry eventually entered Salimgarh Fort through a single entry point. Similar circumstances were reported when the Punjab Fourth Infantry Regiment had earlier entered the Red Fort via the Lahore Gate.

After the rebellion was quelled, the British initially used Salimgarh Fort as a military camp, housing artillery units. From 1945 onwards, it was repurposed as a penitentiary to hold prisoners of the Indian National Army (INA).

== Structure ==
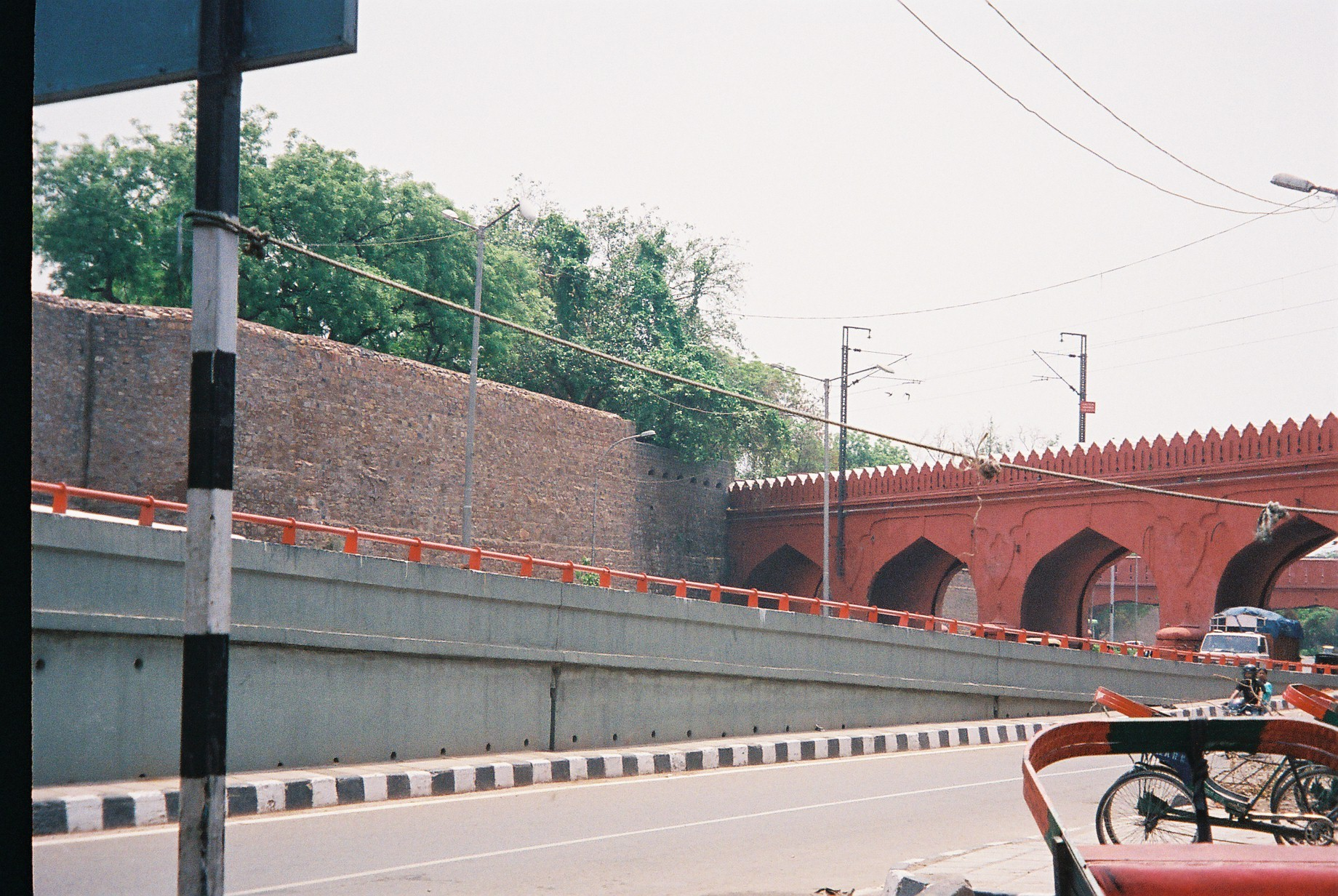
View of Salimgarh Fort with the arch bridge linking it to the Red Fort

Salimgarh Fort has a triangular layout, with thick walls constructed using rubble masonry. The fort features circular bastions and has undergone multiple phases of repair and restoration since its construction.

An arch bridge connects the fort to the Red Fort on its northeastern side. This bridge was built during the reign of Emperor Jahangir and modified many times, and the gate at this point is known as the Bahadur Shah Gate. The gate is constructed primarily of brick masonry, with selective use of red sandstone.

During British rule, a railway line was laid through the area after the demolition of an earlier bridge. This construction divided Salimgarh Fort from the Red Fort and damaged a portion of the latter, an act that was at the time regarded as insensitive and detrimental to heritage preservation. The railway line effectively truncated the fort.

== As a prison ==
During the reign of Aurangzeb, Salimgarh Fort was first converted into a prison. Aurangzeb imprisoned his brother Murad Baksh —who had supported him in his conflict against their elder brother Dara Shikoh—at this fort. Murad Baksh was reportedly captured while asleep after a drinking binge at Mathura. The official reason for his imprisonment was cited as "apostasy for abandoning the fundamental tenets of Islam". He was later transferred to Gwalior, where he was executed.

It is also said that Aurangzeb imprisoned his eldest daughter, Zebunnisa, at Salimgarh Fort for 21 years until her death. Zebunnisa, known for her poetry and interest in music, was reportedly confined for engaging in pursuits that clashed with Aurangzeb's orthodox and austere beliefs. Her sympathy towards her brother Muhammad Akbar, who had fallen out of favour with the emperor, is also believed to have contributed to her imprisonment.

Following the Indian Rebellion of 1857, the British briefly detained the last Mughal emperor, Bahadur Shah Zafar II, at this fort after capturing him at Humayun's Tomb. He was later exiled to Rangoon (present-day Yangon), Burma. Due to its use for detaining political prisoners, the fort has often been compared to the Tower of London in England, where many state prisoners were held and, in some cases, executed or left to die.

Before India attained independence from British rule, Salimgarh Fort was again used as a prison. From 1945 until August 1947, prisoners of the Indian National Army (INA) were held here. In recognition of those who died in the prison, the fort has since been renamed Swatantrata Senani Smarak (Freedom Fighters' Memorial).

There are also several legends associated with the fort, particularly regarding paranormal activity. One of the more well-known stories involves the spirit of Zebunnisa, veiled in black, said to sing her poems on moonlit nights. Another tale recounts the sounds of moaning and groaning—believed to be those of INA soldiers who were tortured and died in captivity—heard in the area. These narratives have contributed to the fort's symbolic link between the Mughal and British eras in India's history.

== Fort conservation measures ==
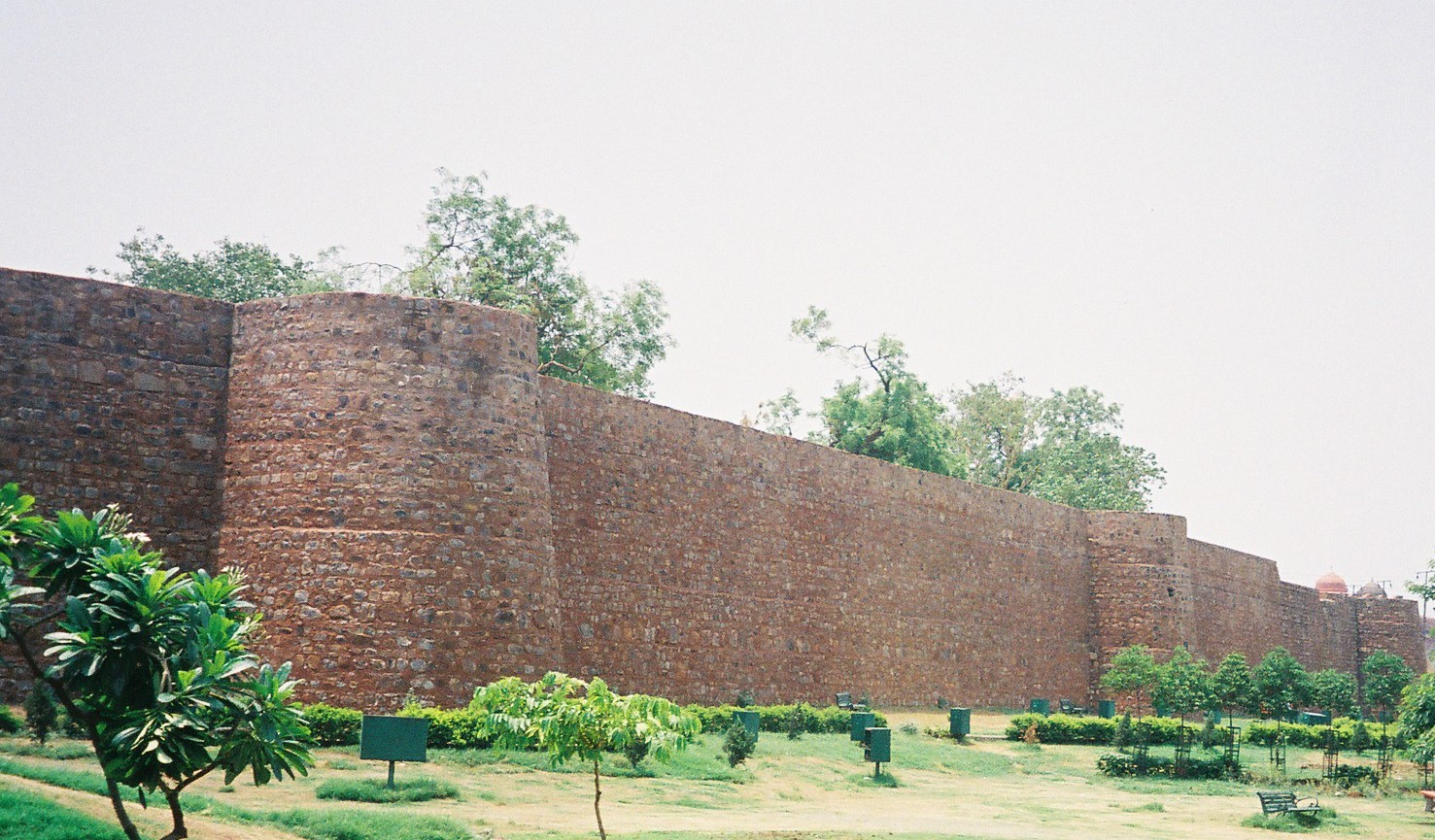
An impressive view of Salimgarh Fort from the main road, showing its circular bastions

Salimgarh Fort was continuously occupied by military forces from the time of the First War of Independence in 1857 until 2005. Initially, it was under the control of the British Army, which established artillery units and used the fort as a prison. After India attained independence on 15 August 1947, the fort came under the control of the Indian Army. Over the years, several other government agencies, including the Archaeological Survey of India (ASI), were also involved in its maintenance.

This overlapping administrative control created difficulties for the ASI, particularly when it approached UNESCO in 1992 to propose the fort’s inclusion on the World Heritage List. Due to the lack of full administrative control, the ASI had to withdraw its application. The situation hindered effective conservation and preservation efforts for Salimgarh Fort, the Red Fort, and other monuments within the Red Fort Complex.

The ASI submitted an affidavit to the courts stating: "It is impossible to maintain these portions of the fort unless and until they are completely vacated and handed over to the ASI for proper assessment of the damage already caused." The ASI further stated that the Ministry of Tourism, Government of India, would re-approach UNESCO for World Heritage status once full jurisdiction was transferred and restoration work was completed.

In December 2003, the Indian Army officially handed over the fort to the ASI. Subsequently, in 2006, the ASI submitted a fresh proposal for World Heritage listing. The World Heritage Committee approved the Government of India's request during its session held from 23 to 27 June 2007 in Christchurch, New Zealand. A press release issued by the ASI following the inscription stated:

"The core zone of about 50 hectares includes the Red Fort and Salimgarh Fort, while the buffer zone measuring over 40 hectares includes the immediate surroundings of the Red Fort and Salimgarh Fort. The Red Fort Complex, Delhi is classified as a cultural property with outstanding universal value. The inscription of the Red Fort on the World Heritage List is very significant for Delhi, as the Red Fort Complex becomes the third World Heritage Site in the city—an honour that no other single location in the country can claim."

Following the listing, and under the direction of the Supreme Court of India, the ASI prepared a draft Comprehensive Conservation Management Plan (CCMP) based on a detailed assessment of the site's historical and cultural significance. The plan accounted for the roles and responsibilities of various departments and agencies previously operating within the fort. It also proposed the restoration of the historic bridge linking the Red Fort to Salimgarh Fort, recognising its symbolic value as a link between the Mughal and British periods.

Pending formal approval of the CCMP and prioritisation of its proposals, the ASI initiated several restoration works. These included conservation efforts in the Red Fort at an estimated cost of ₹27.5 million (approximately US$0.55 million), and in Salimgarh Fort at a cost of ₹8 million (approximately US$160,000), with the aim of completing them before the 2010 Commonwealth Games.

== Museum ==
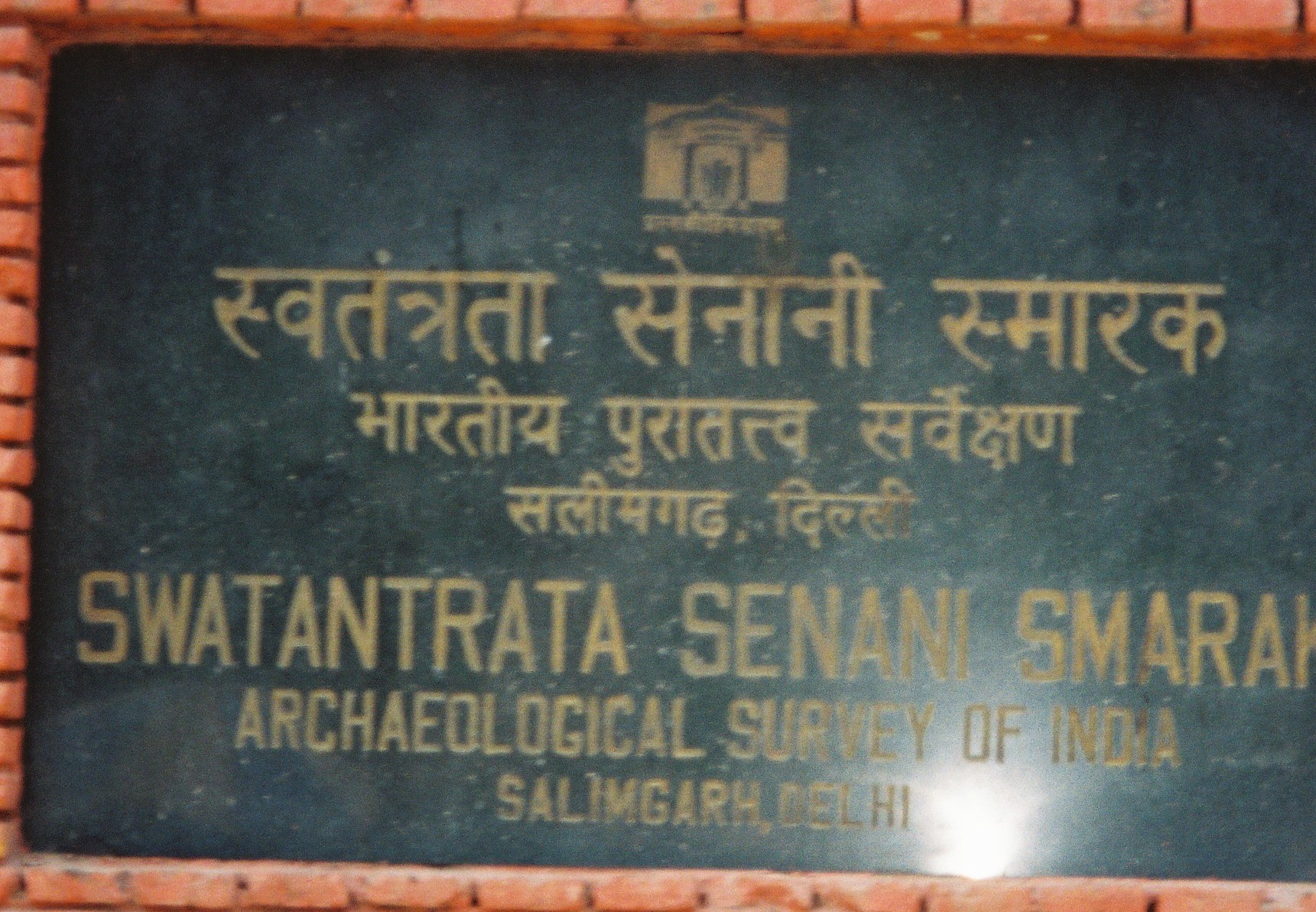
Salimgarh Fort, named as Swatantrata Senani Smarak

The Swatantra Sangram Museum (Museum of the Freedom Struggle), located within the Salimgarh Fort precincts of the Red Fort Complex, was opened to the public on 2 October 1995. The site was chosen as it served as a prison where members of the Indian National Army (INA) were incarcerated by the British from 1945 until India’s independence on 15 August 1947. Many of the INA prisoners reportedly died within the fort's jail premises.

The initial identification of the museum's location was based on information provided by Colonel Gurbaksh Singh Dhillon, who had indicated the area where the British conducted the INA trials for treason in 1945. However, after the museum was established, Colonel Dhillon later clarified that the actual site of the trial was in a different building adjacent to the existing museum.

In 2007, marking the 60th year of India’s independence, the Archaeological Survey of India (ASI) decided to relocate the museum to this newly identified site. The upgraded museum was planned to include:

"more documents for the new galleries, apart from providing better lighting, panelling, and displays for existing structures."

On this occasion, a new section on Mahatma Gandhi was also proposed, featuring full-scale depictions of significant events such as the Jallianwala Bagh massacre and the Salt Satyagraha.

Following an intervention by the Prime Minister, the premises of Salimgarh Fort and the museum were formally opened to the public. To enhance visitor engagement, ASI introduced tourist guides at the Red Fort entrance to direct visitors to Salimgarh Fort, which remained relatively unknown compared to the more prominent Red Fort. Additionally, the long walking distance from the Red Fort gate to the museum had earlier discouraged public interest, a challenge that is now being addressed through improved signage and guided tours.

== Access ==
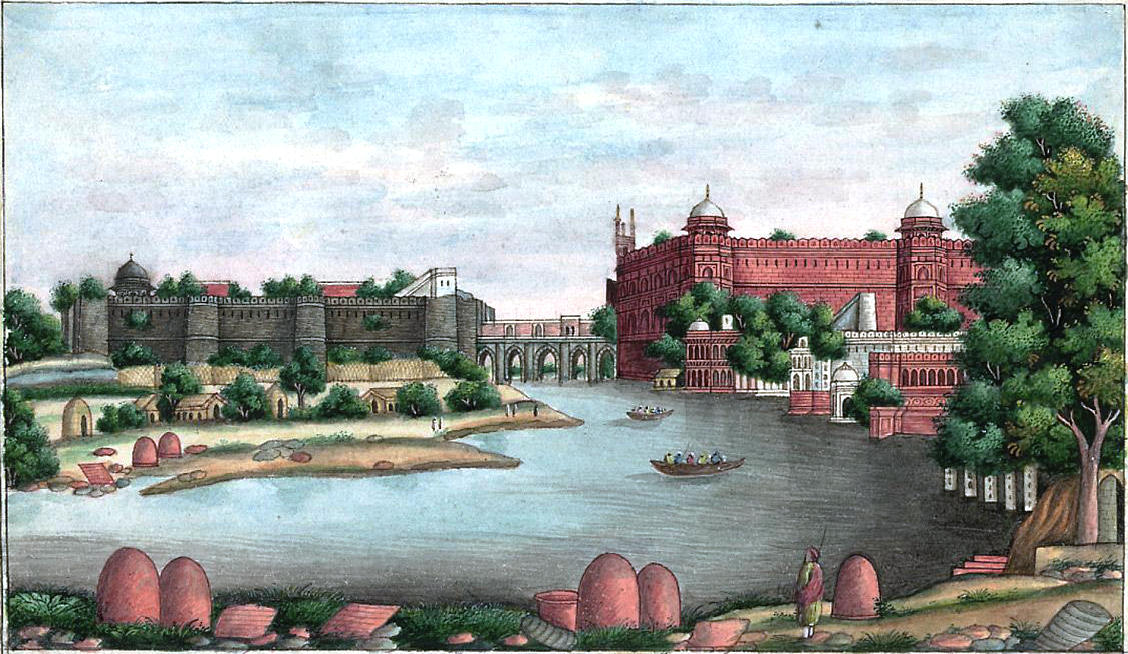
Salimgarh Fort (on the left) and Red Fort, separated by the Yamuna River spill channel (now closed and converted into a road), connected by an arched bridge, as viewed from Metcalfe's townhouse, 1843.

In the early years, Salimgarh Fort could only be accessed by boat. A bridge linking the Red Fort to Salimgarh Fort is believed to have been constructed by Emperor Jahangir, father of Shah Jahan. However, some sources attribute its construction to Farid Khan, who held the fort as a jagir (land grant). This original bridge was later replaced by a railway bridge at the same location. At present, an arched overbridge connects Salimgarh Fort to the Red Fort from its northeastern end. From this vantage point, the fort offers a commanding view of the Red Fort, the Yamuna River, and the surrounding areas.

However, the area is often noisy due to the continuous flow of heavy traffic along the arterial roads surrounding the complex, as well as vehicular movement over the steel bridge across the Yamuna nearby. The East India Railway was extended to Delhi through Salimgarh Fort. The railway line passed over part of the fort structure and was later extended to connect with the Rajputana Railway.

== Gallery ==
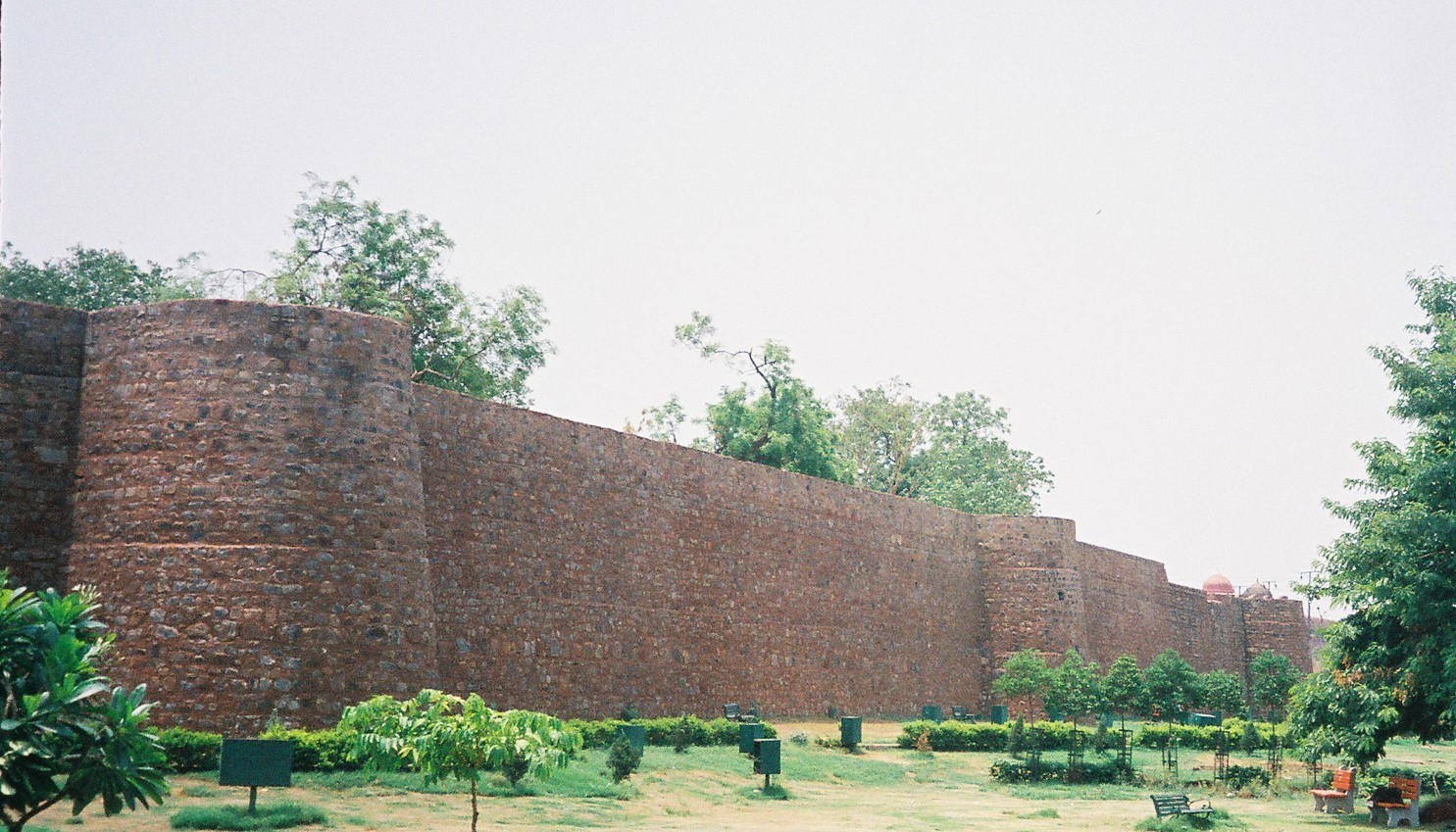
Another view of Salimgarh Fort

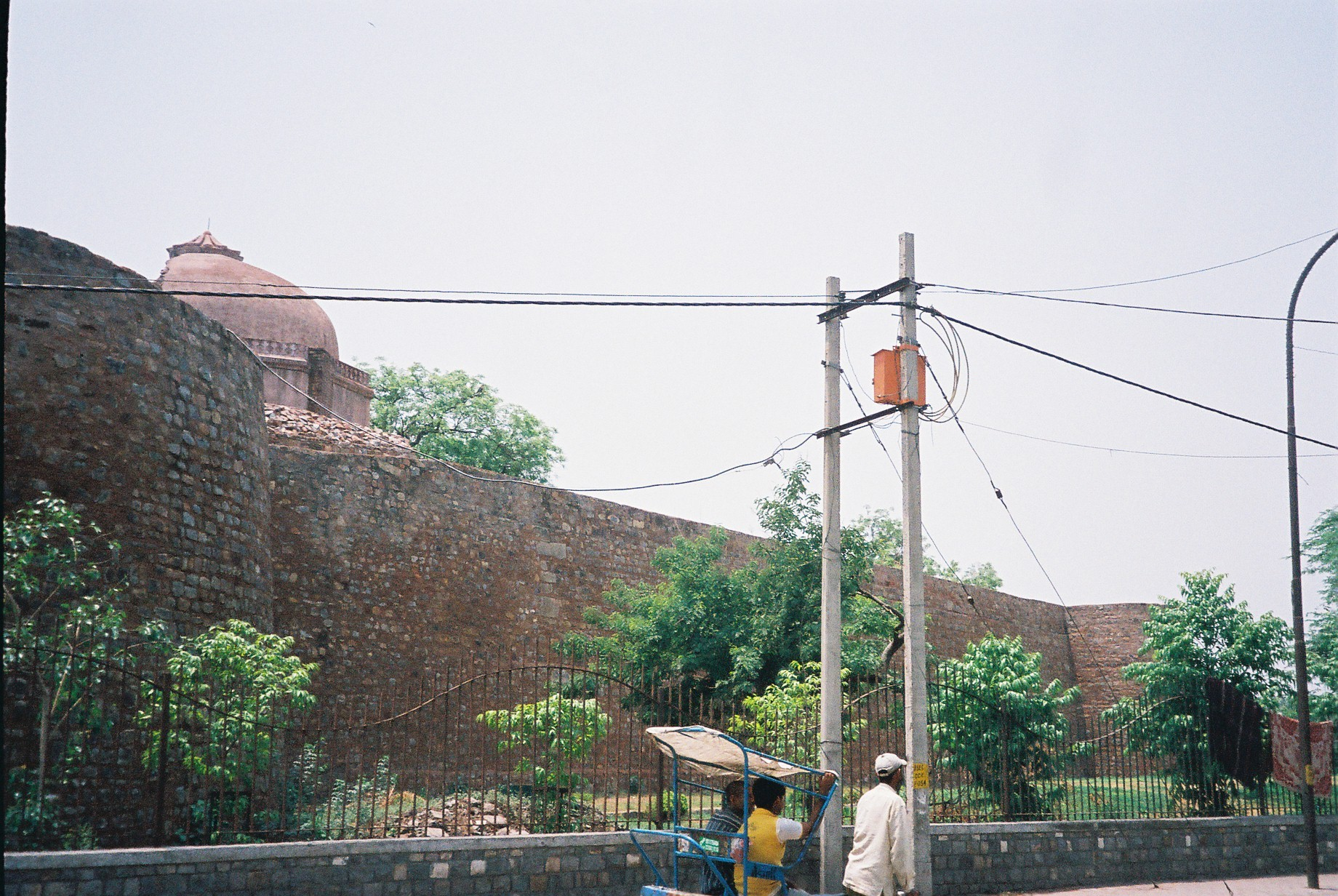
View showing buildings inside the fort

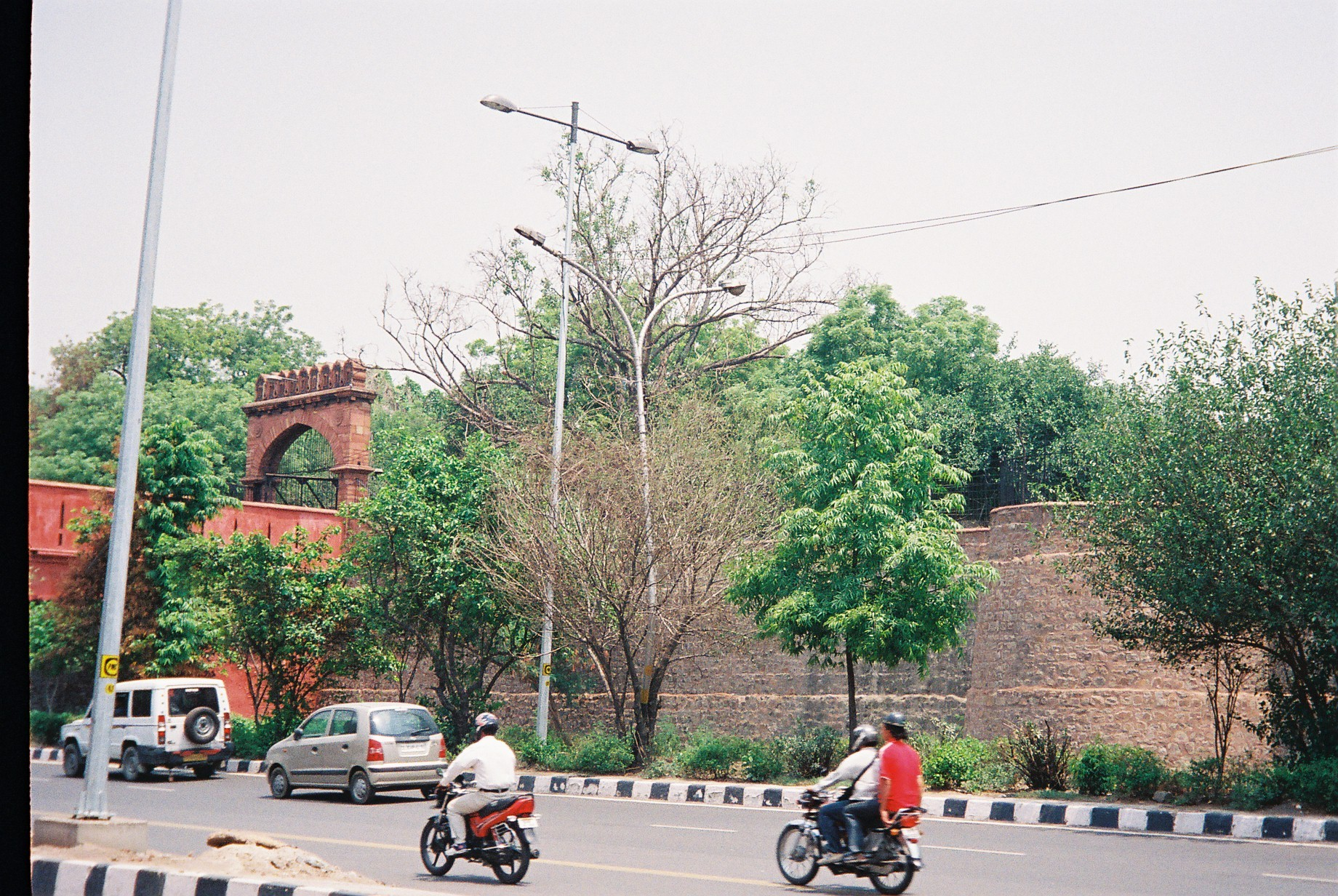
View of Gate entry to bridge between Red Fort and Salimgarh Fort with a plaque declaring it as Swatantrata Senani Smarak

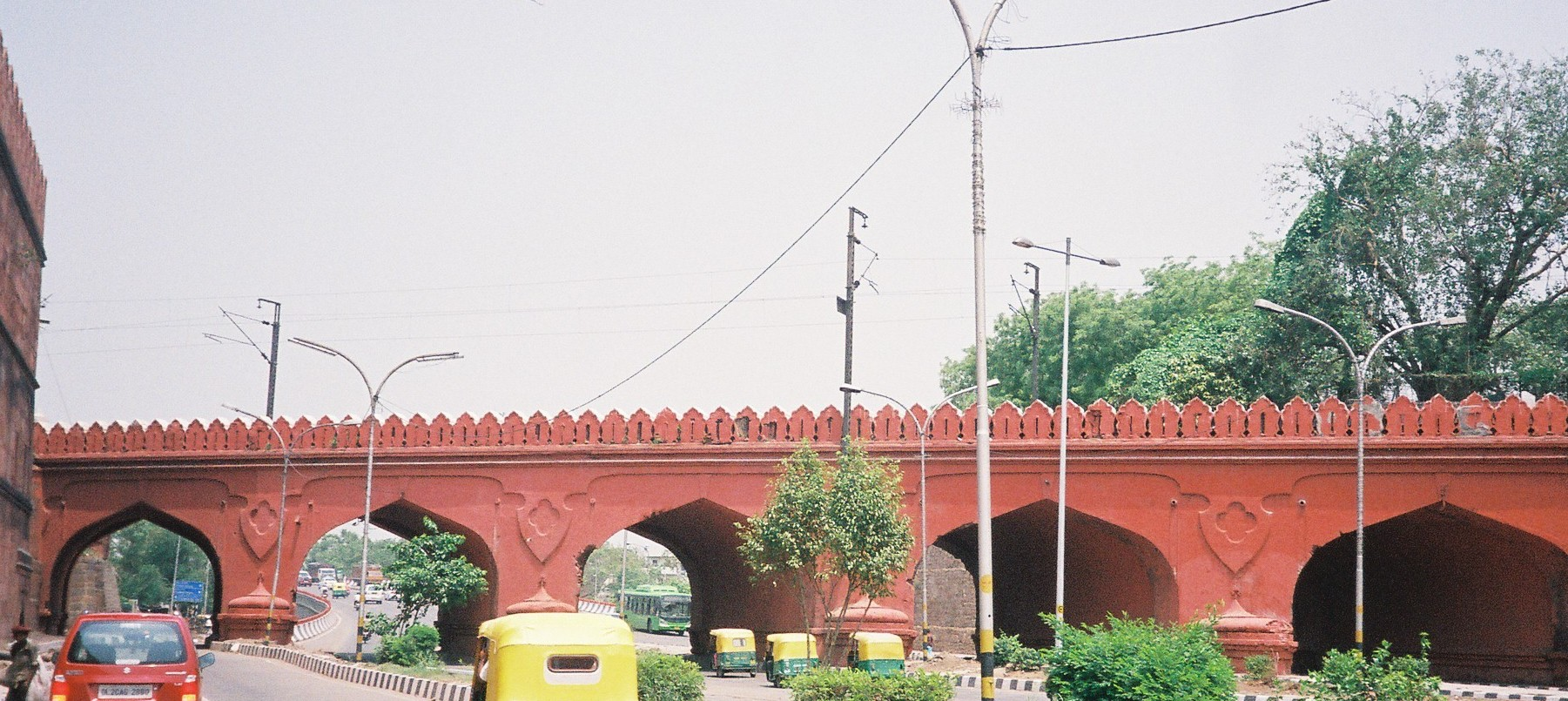
Arched bridge linking Salimgarh and Red Forts on former Yamuna River channel now closed and converted into the main thoroughfare

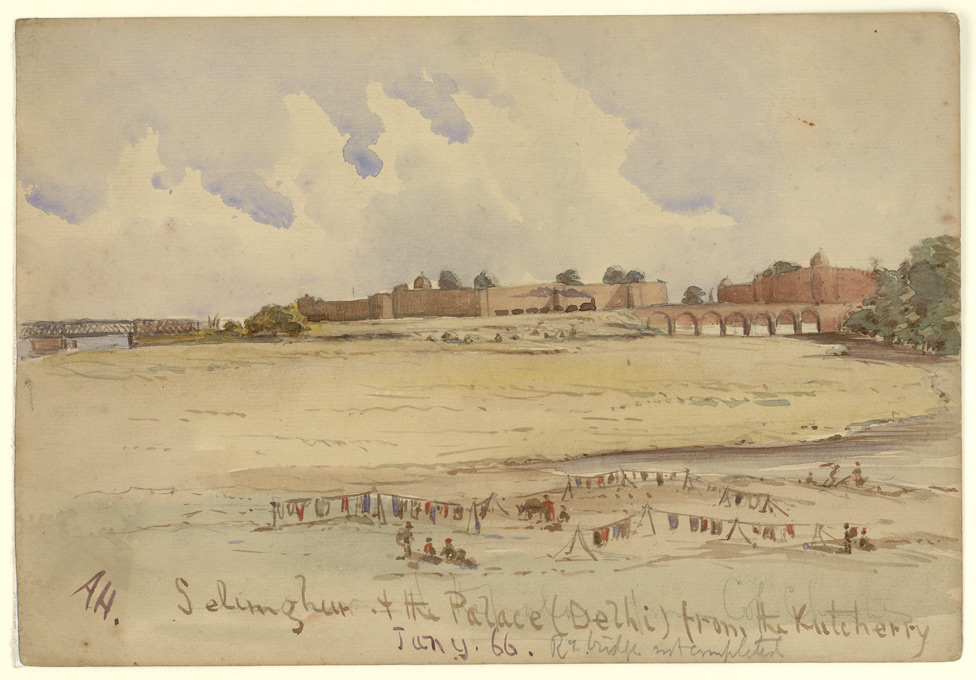
Salimgarh Fort and the Red Fort palace

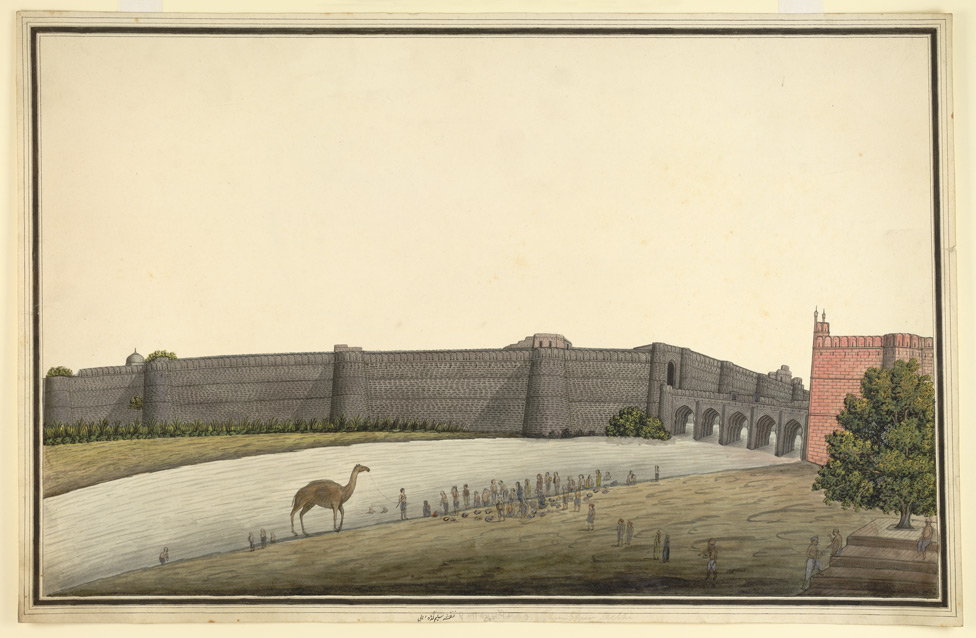
A colour painting showing Salimgarh Fort linked to Red Fort

== See also ==
- Capital forts/palaces in Delhi, oldest first
  - Purana Qila, earliest Hindu rulers
    - Indraprastha, earlier than 1000 BCE
    - Edicts & additions by Ashoka the Great (r. 268 to 232 BCE) of Maurya Empire
  - Anangpur, by Anangpal I of Tomara dynasty (r. 736-1152 CE)
  - Qila Rai Pithora
    - Lal Kot, by Tomara dynasty (1152-1177 CE) as capital
    - Qila Rai Pithora, the Lal Kot expended by Prithviraj Chauhan (also called Rai Pithora, r. 1177–92 CE) of Chauhan dynasty
  - Siri Fort, by Alauddin Khalji (r. 1296–1316), second ruler of Khalji Dynasty
  - Tughlaqabad Fort, by Ghiyassudin Tughluq (r. 1320-25 CE) of Tughluq dynasty
  - Feroz Shah Kotla, by Feroz Shah Tughluq (r. 1351-88 CE) of Tughluq dynasty
  - Salimgarh Fort, in 1546 CE by Salim Shah Suri (r. 1545-54 CE), son of Sher Shah Suri
  - Red fort, built in 1639-48 CE by Mughal emperor Shah Jahan when he moved his capital from Agra to Delhi
  - Rashtrapati Bhavan, built in 1912–29 by colonial British raj
- History of Delhi
  - Paleolithic sites in & around Tughlaqabad Fort
  - Stepwells of Delhi
