= Nahan Kothi =

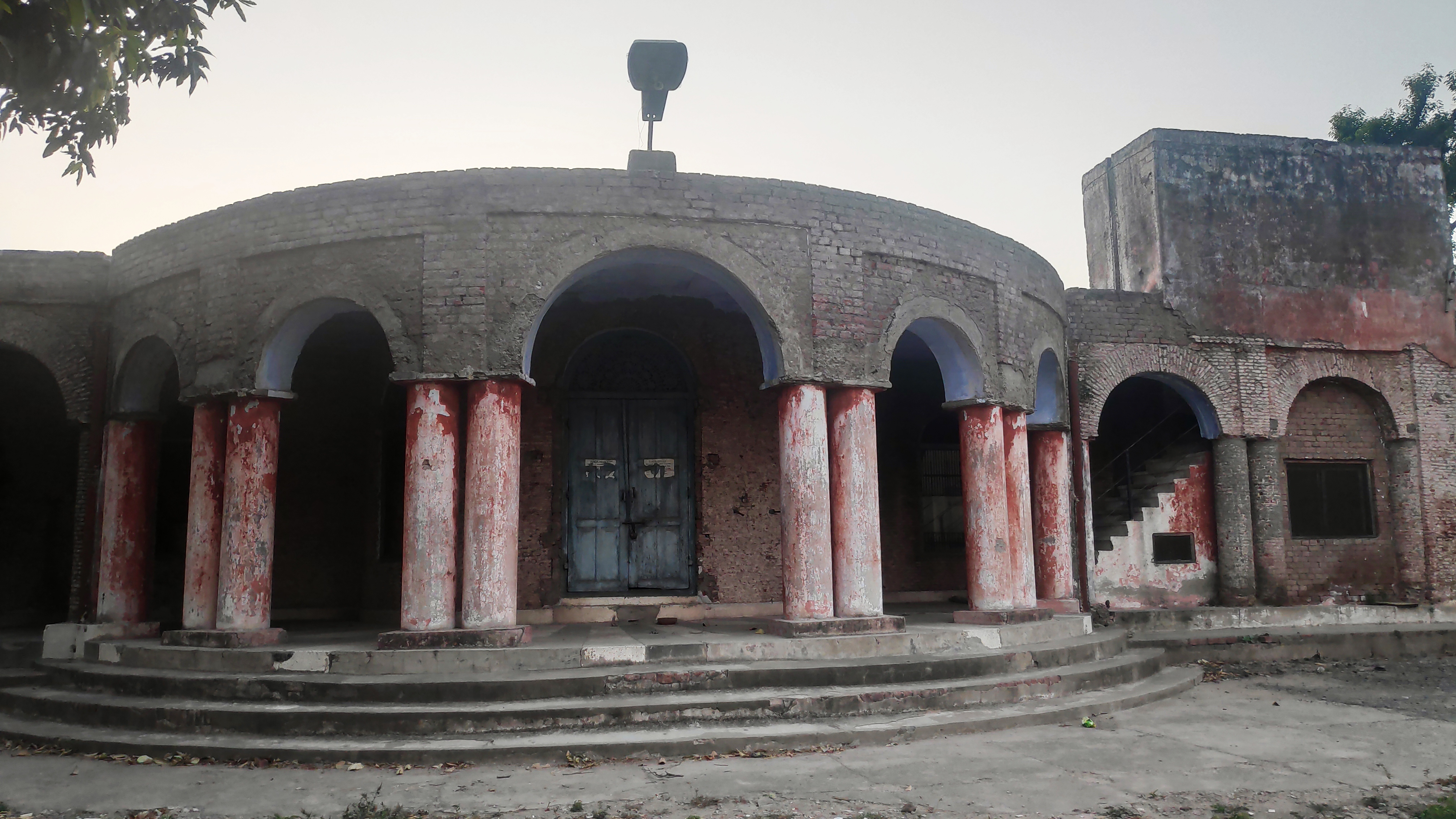
- Nahan Kothi Panchkula
- Interactive map of Nahan Kothi
- 30°40′33.574″N 76°51′14.213″E
- Type: Under restoration order
- Satellite of: Panchkula
- Location: Panchkula, India
- Region: Sector 12
- Part of: Sirmour State, 19th century

Site notes
- Owner: Forests and Public Works (Building and Roads) Minister
- Public access: No access

Nahan Kothi is a 160-year-old building, situated at Railli village, near Sector 12-A Panchkula. It is the only remnant of the 19th century British architecture in the area.

This Red Kothi was built on the order of Surjan Singh and Bir Singh, princes of Raja Fateh Singh (1857-63 AD), the ruler of Sirmour State. This region including Morni and other adjoining hilly areas of Haryana, was then under the command Sirmour. Its capital was Nahan (Himachal Pradesh), hence the name, Nahan Kothi.

- It was generally used as a watchtower by the rulers to keep watch on the activities of their territory. Occasionally, it was used as an overnight halt during hunting expeditions. Its original characteristics of architectural style are still intact.
- It was home to Panchkula's consumer forum since November 20, 1997
- The building was declared as a protected monument by the Archaeological Survey of India in 2007

== History ==
It is stated in the affidavit that the building was declared a protected monument by the Archaeological Survey of India in 2007, much after the District Forum had started functioning from there in 1997.

Haryana has finally taken possession of the 160-year-old Nahan Kothi as a protected monument, and is planning to restore it as a heritage structure. In May last year, after 10 years of struggle, the Department of Archaeology and Museums of Haryana took control of Nahan Kothi for its restoration work.

In 2007, Panchkula's DC Rajinder Kataria decided that the forum will be shifted to the upcoming new building of the district courts complex. The new building of the district courts was inaugurated on May 21, 2012. In view of the judgment, archaeology and museums asked the consumer forum in 2009 to vacate the building.

Principal Secretary of the Department of Archaeology and Museums, Dr. Sumita Misra, said, “This building is of typical British architecture. So, the state archaeology department has taken over and we have asked the tourism department to oversee work on the building’s conservation.”

== Gallery ==
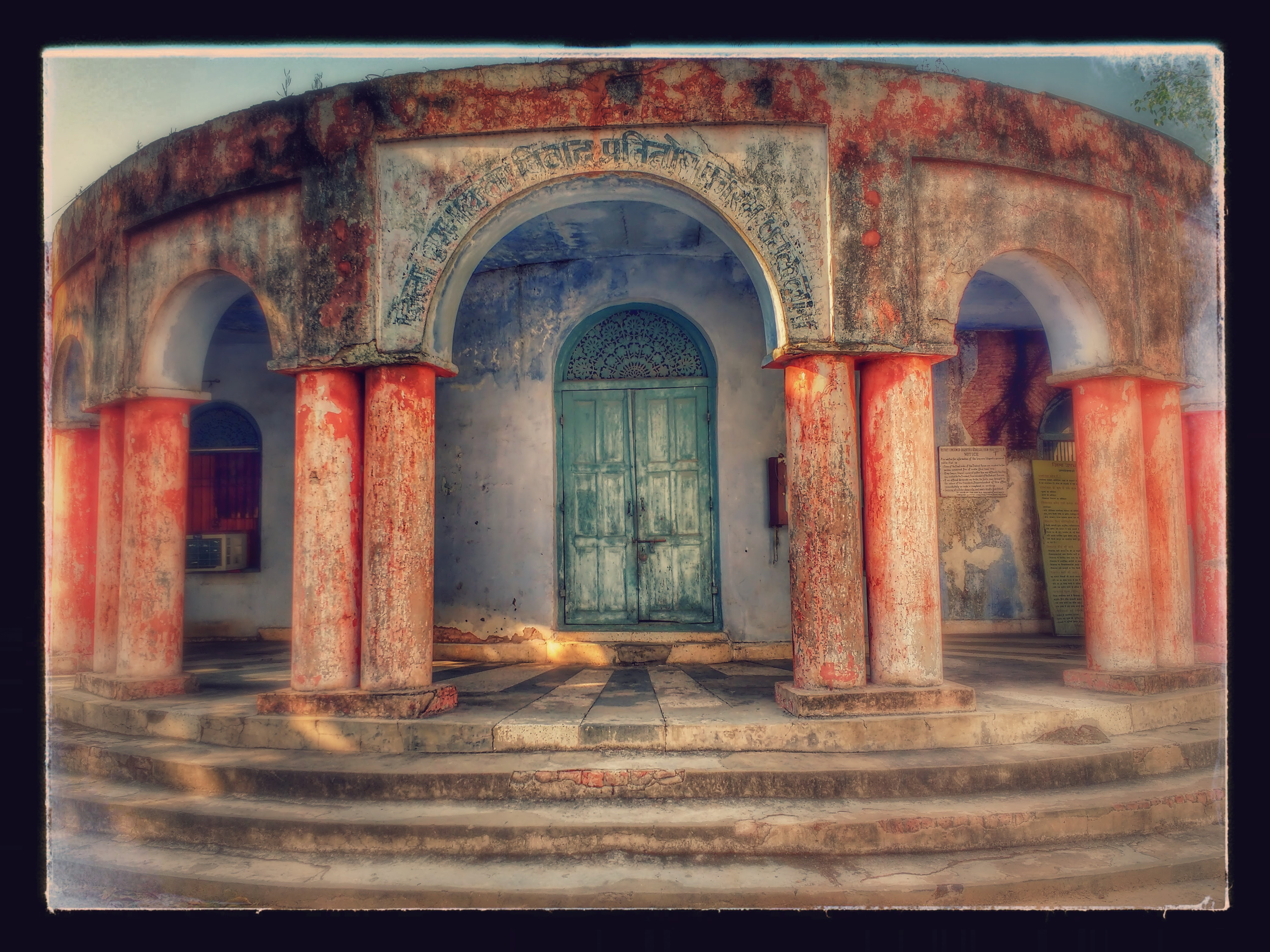
Nahan Kothi Front View

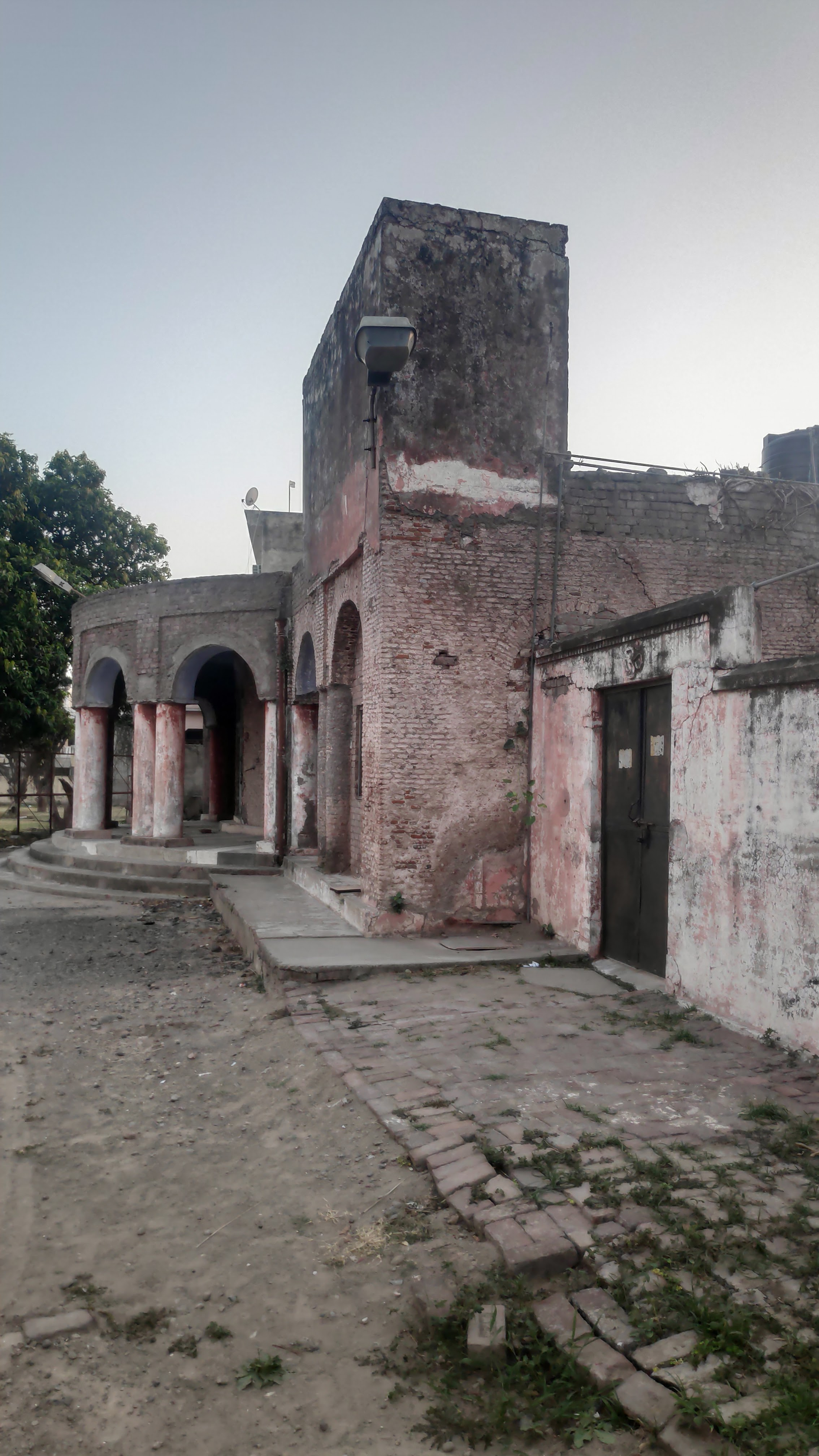
Nahan Kothi Side View

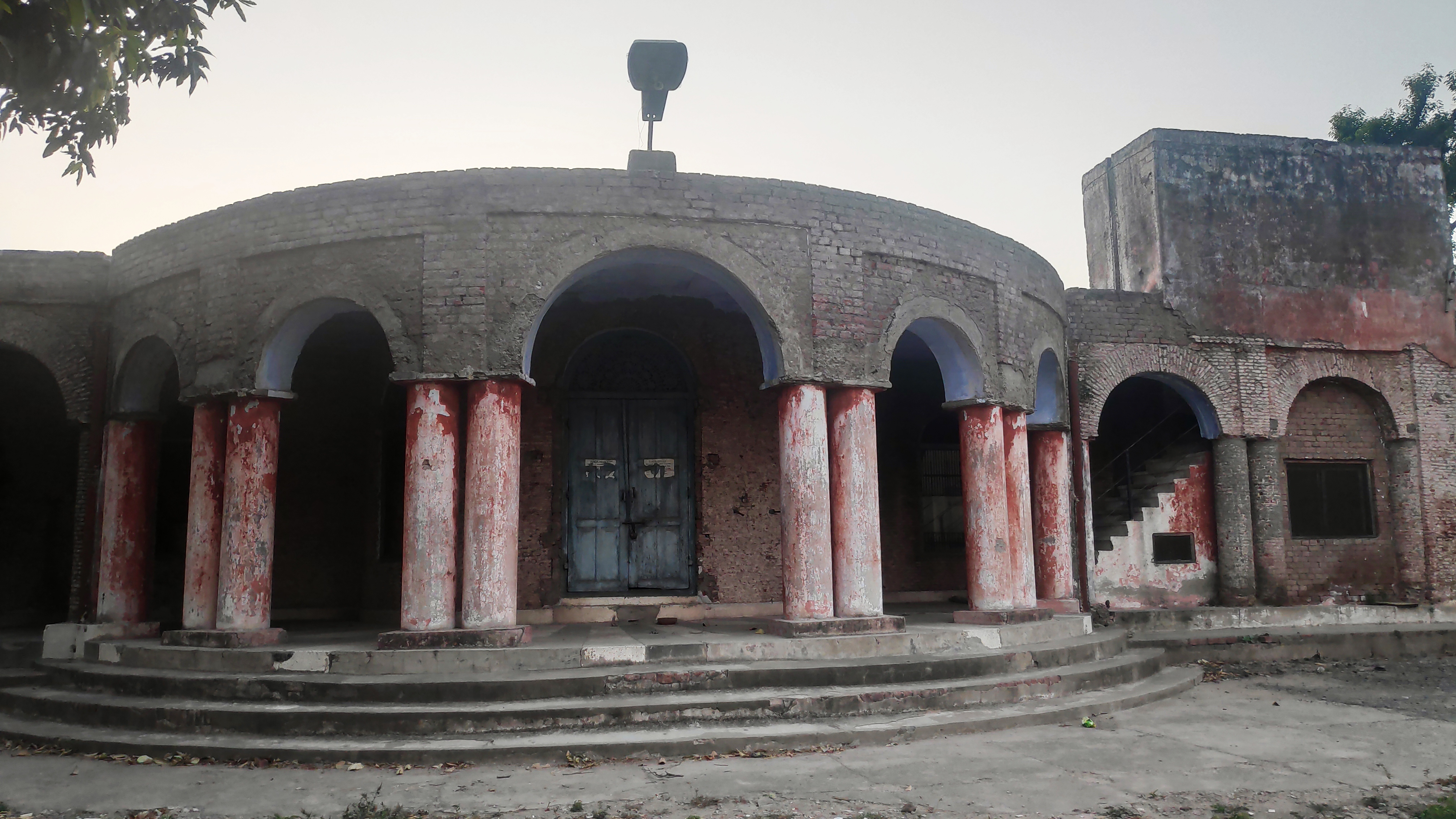
Nahan Kothi Front View

== Restoration ==
The state tourism department will draft a plan for restoration of the building in Sector 12. It's considered unsafe currently due to its dilapidated condition, A caretaker has been appointed to look after the building until restoration begins.

The Director-General of Archaeology and Museums Department, Haryana, Dr Praveen Kumar said, “Right now, Nahan Kothi is not on our list of priorities for restoration. We have a small budget and for now we are focusing on other constructions in the state. It is not that we haven’t been taking care of it as there is always a caretaker present at the building. No renovation has been contemplated at present and any measures which will be taken will be done after March of 2018. We have it in consideration but since it is not too major a structure, steps have not been taken yet.”

It has further been stated that now the government/district administration has desired to shift the Consumers Forum, Panchkula, to SCO 208, Sector 14, Panchkula, which building has been taken at a monthly rent of Rs. 1.5 lakh by the e Haryana Government.
