= Jarral =

Muslim Rajput tribe of Pakistan

Jarral (Urdu: جـرال راجپوت, also spelled Jaral, Jerral) is a Muslim Rajput tribe of Azad Kashmir and Punjab provinces of Pakistan. It is a sub-clan of Tomar (Tanwar/Toor) Rajput of Chandravanshi Lineage. The Jarrals ruled the city of Rajouri until they were defeated by the Sikh army in 1819.

== See also ==
- Pathania
- Tomaras of Dehli
