= Rajouri =

Rajouri Rājpur
- City
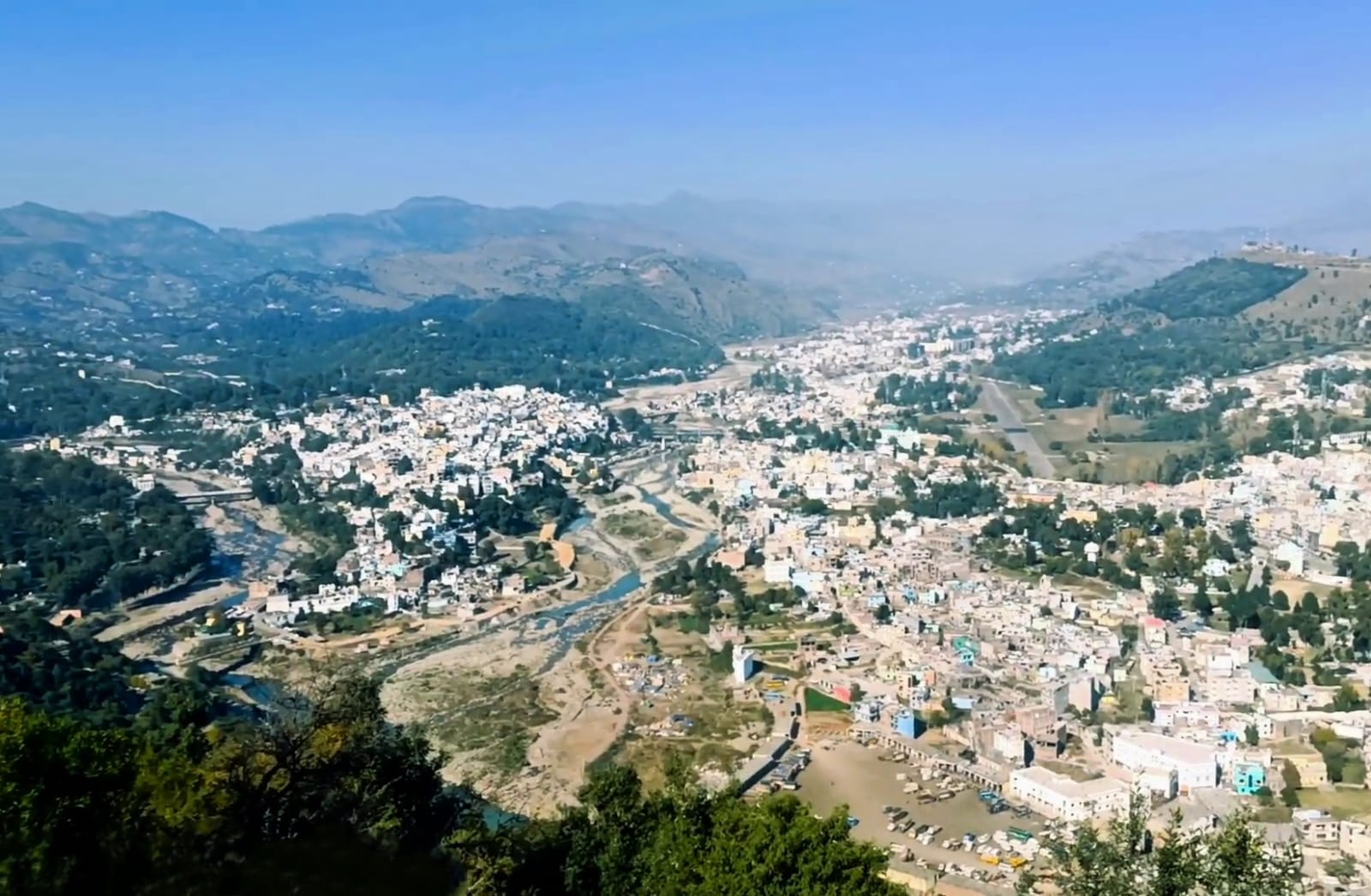
- Aerial view of Rajouri city.

- Location in Jammu & Kashmir, India
- Coordinates: 33°22′36″N 74°18′44″E
- Country: India
- Union Territory: Jammu & Kashmir
- Division: Jammu
- District: Rajouri
- Settled: 623 BC

Government
  - Type: Municipal Committee
  - Body: Rajouri Municipal Committee
- Elevation: 915 m (3,002 ft)

Population (2011)
  - Total: 41,552 (Including Kheora and Jawahar Nagar); 642,415 (in Rajouri district)

Languages
  - Official: Punjabi, Gojri, Dogri, Hindi, Urdu, Kashmiri, English
  - Spoken: Punjabi (Pahari dialect), Dogri, Gojri, Hindi, Urdu
- Time zone: UTC+5:30 (IST)
- Postal code: 185135
- Website: rajouri.nic.in rajouri.in

Rajouri or Rajauri (/rəˈdʒɔːri/; Hindustani pronunciation: [ɾɑːd͡ʒɔːɾiː]; IAST: rājaurī) is a city in the Rajouri district of the Jammu division of the Indian union territory of Jammu and Kashmir. It is located about 155 kilometres (96 mi) from Srinagar and 150 km (93 mi) from Jammu city on the Poonch Highway.

Rajouri city is widely known for its tradition of writing their language, Punjabi in the Devanagari script, by the natives of the city.

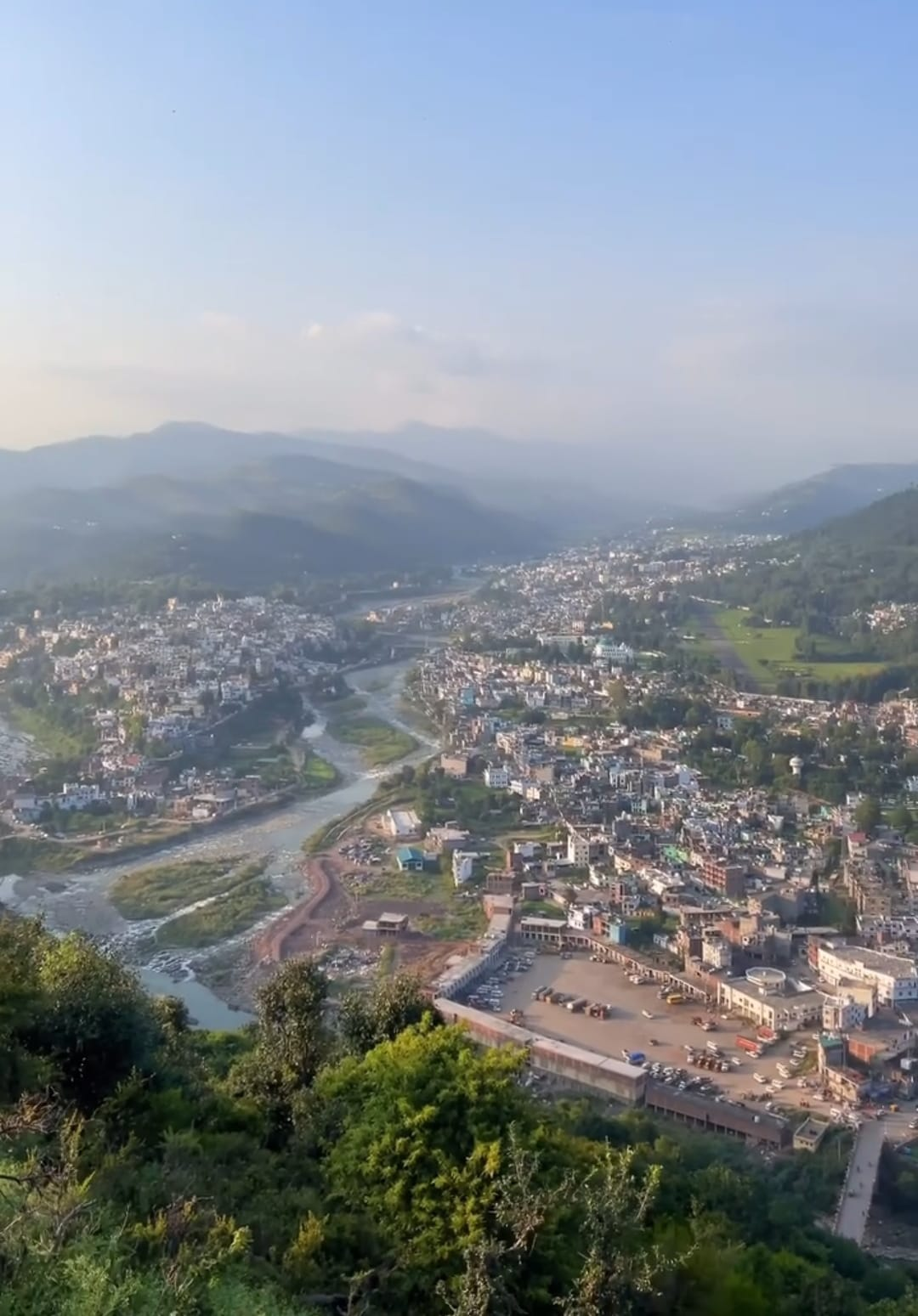
Rajouri city

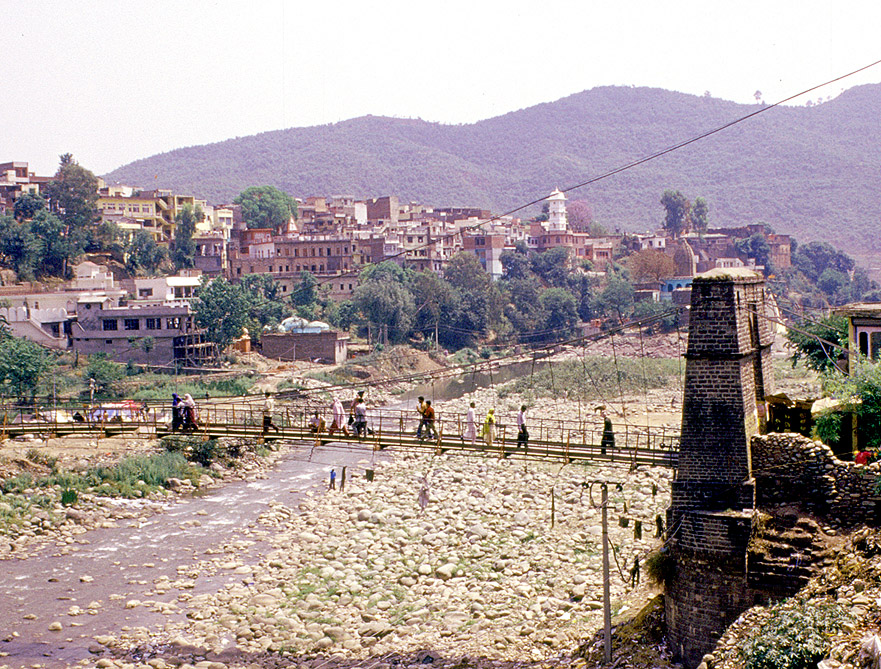
Jhula bridge in Medina colony, Rajouri city.

== History ==
The first ruler of this Kingdom was Raja Prithvi Pal from the Jarral Rajput clan ruled Rajouri from 1033 to 1192, Prithvi Pal defended Pir Panjal at the time of incursion of Mahmud of Ghazni in 1021 CE. The old name of Rajouri was "Rajapuri" as mentioned in Rajtarangni of Kalhana Pandita written in 1148 CE.

Rajouri came under the suzerainty of the Kashmir Sultanate during the 15th century through the military campaigns of General Malik Tazi Bhat. In 1475, he led conquests that brought Rajouri, along with Poonch, Jammu, Bhimber, Jhelum, Sialkot, and Gujrat, under the administrative control of the Kashmiri Sultan. Local rulers retained limited autonomy but were required to acknowledge the Sultan’s authority and provide tribute and military support. This vassal arrangement continued until the late 16th century, when Mughal Emperor Akbar annexed Kashmir in 1586, ending Kashmir’s control over Rajouri.

During the Mughal rule, the Jarral Rajput rulers or Raja agreed to a treaty with the Mughal Empire and thus were given the title 'Mirza'. In 1810 and 1812, Maharaja Ranjit Singh attempted to conquer Bhimber, Kotli, and Rajouri. However, Rajouri successfully resisted these invasions. In 1813, Gulab Singh of Jammu captured Rajouri for the Sikh Empire of Maharaja Ranjit Singh, by defeating Raja Aghar Khan. After this, Rajouri became part of the Sikh Empire. But parts of it were given as jagirs to Raja Rahimullah Khan (the brother of Raja Agarullah Khan) and other parts to Gulab Singh.

Following the First Anglo-Sikh War and the Treaty of Amritsar (1846), all the territories between the Ravi River and the Indus were transferred to Gulab Singh, and he was recognised as an independent Maharaja of Jammu and Kashmir. Thus Rajouri became a part of the princely state of Jammu and Kashmir. Gulab Singh changed the name of Rajouri to Rampur. He appointed Mian Hathu as Governor of Rajouri, who remained in Rajouri up to 1856. Mian Hathu constructed a stunning temple in between Thanna Nallah in close proximity to Rajouri city. He also built Rajouri Fort at Dhannidhar village.

After Mian Hathu, Rajouri was transformed into a tehsil and affiliated with Bhimber district. In 1904, this tehsil was separated from Bhimber and affiliated with the Reasi district.

=== Partition ===
After the Partition of India and the accession of Jammu and Kashmir to India in October 1947, there followed the First Kashmir War between India and Pakistan. The Pakistani raiders, along with the rebels and deserters from the western districts of the state, captured Rajouri on 7 November 1947. The 30,000 Hindus and Sikhs living in Rajouri were reportedly killed, wounded or abducted. Rajouri was recaptured on 12 April 1948 by the 19 Infantry Brigade of the Indian Army under the command of Second Lieutenant Rama Raghoba Rane. Rane, despite being wounded, launched a bold tank assault by conveying the tanks over the Tawi river bed in order to avoid the road blocks along the main road. (Note: Rama Raghoba Rane received a Param Vir Chakra for his gallantry.) When the Indian Army entered the town, the captors had fled, having destroyed most of the town and killing all its inhabitants. After the arrival of the Army, some 1,500 refugees that had fled to the hills, including women and children, returned to the town. The ceasefire line at the end of the War ran to the west of the Rajouri-Reasi district.

=== Inside India ===
Soon after the war, the Rajouri and Reasi tehsils were separated. The Rajouri tehsil was merged with the Indian-administered Poonch district to form the Poonch-Rajouri district. The Reasi tehsil was merged with the Udhampur district.

On 1 January 1968, the two tehsils were reunited and the resulting district was named the Rajouri district.

The Reasi tehsil was also separated out in 2006 into a separate Reasi district. The present Rajouri district comprises the 1947 Rajouri tehsil.

Rajouri witnessed some of the toughest fighting during the Second Kashmir War in 1965. Pakistani infiltration in Kashmir during Operation Gibraltar caused Rajouri to be initially captured from the Indian Army by undercover Pakistani commandos. But the wider operation failed and, with all-out war with India looming, Pakistan withdrew its troops. Major Malik Munawar Khan Awan, a Pakistani commando officer who led the attack on Rajouri on the night of 15 September 1965, was later awarded the title "King of Rajouri" by the Government of Pakistan.

== Geography and education ==
Rajouri is located at 33.38°N 74.3°E. It has an average elevation of 915 metres (3001 feet).

Rajouri has its own deemed University Baba Ghulam Shah Badshah University popularly known as BGSBU which offers various Diploma, UG and PG courses. It also has one Government Medical College GMC Rajouri along with other degree colleges.

== Climate ==
The climate of Rajouri is somewhat cooler than the other surrounding plains. Summers are short and pleasant. Winters are cool and chilly characterized with rainfall due to western disturbances. Snowfall is scanty but may occur in cool months like that of December 2012. Average rainfall is 769 millimetres (26.3 in) in the wettest months The average temperature of summer is 28 °C and average temperature of winter is 8 °C.

== Demographics ==
Religion in Rajouri City (2011)
Religion	Percent
Hinduism	57.06%
Islam	37.08%
Sikhism	5.09%
Christianity	0.51%
Other or not stated	0.17%

At the 2011 census, Rajouri itself had a population of 37,552 while the population within the municipal limits was 41,552. Males constituted 57% of the population and females 43%. Rajouri had an average literacy rate of 77%, higher than the national average of 75.5%: male literacy was 83% and female literacy was 68%. 12% of the population was under 6 years of age. The people are mostly Paharis, Dogras and Gujjars.

=== Religion ===
Hinduism is the largest religion in Rajouri city, followed by over 57.06% of the population, and is primarily practiced by the city's native Punjabi community. Islam is the second-largest religion with 37.08% adherents and Sikhism form 5.09% of the population.

=== Language ===
Languages of Rajouri City (2011)
1. Punjabi (Pahari dialect) (60.0%)
2. Hindi (21.0%)
3. Gojri (6.50%)
4. Kashmiri (3.10%)
5. Urdu (1.00%)
6. Dogri (0.80%)
7. Others (7.60%)

Punjabi is the most spoken language of the city, primarily spoken by the native Hindus of the city.

== Members of Legislative Assembly ==
Election	Member	Party
1962	Abdul Aziz Shawal	Jammu and Kashmir National Conference
1967	Abdul Rashid	Jammu and Kashmir National Conference
1972	Chowdhary Talib Hussain	Jammu and Kashmir National Conference
1977	Chowdhary Talib Hussain	Jammu and Kashmir National Conference
1983	Chowdhary Talib Hussain	Jammu and Kashmir National Conference
1987	Mirsa Abdul Rashid	Jammu and Kashmir National Conference
1996	Mohammad Sharief Tariq	Jammu and Kashmir National Conference
2002	Mohammad Aslam	Jammu and Kashmir National Conference
2008	Shabbir Ahmed Khan	Indian National Congress
2014	Qamar Hussain	Jammu and Kashmir Peoples Democratic Party
2024	Iftkar Ahmed	Indian National Congress

== Transport ==
=== Air ===
Rajouri Airport is located 1 km from the town but currently is non-operational. The nearest airport to Rajouri is Jammu Airport which located 154 kilometres from Rajouri and is a 4 hr drive. Helicopter services linking Rajouri district to Jammu started on 13 September 2017, but it was aborted later.

=== Rail ===
Rajouri does not have its own railway station. The nearest railway station to Rajouri is Jammu Tawi railway station which is located at a distance of 151 kilometres from the town and is a 4 hr drive. There are plans to connect Rajouri by rail through the Jammu–Poonch Railway Line in the near future.

=== Road ===
Rajouri is well-connected by road to other towns, villages and cities of Jammu and Kashmir. The NH 144A passes through Rajouri.

== See also ==
- Banda Singh Bahadur, Sikh general
- Baba Ghulam Shah Badshah University, Rajouri
- GMC RAJOURI
- GDC RAJOURI

== Bibliography ==
- Panikkar, K. M. (1930), Gulab Singh, London: Martin Hopkinson Ltd
- Ramachandran, D. P. (2008), Empire's First Soldiers, Lancer Publishers, pp. 171–, ISBN 978-0-9796174-7-8
- Sarkar, Col. Bhaskar (2016), Outstanding Victories of the Indian Army, 1947-1971, Lancer Publishers, pp. 40–, ISBN 978-1-897829-73-8
- Singh, V. K. (2005), Leadership in the Indian Army: Biographies of Twelve Soldiers, SAGE Publications, pp. 160–, ISBN 978-0-7619-3322-9
